= New Copse =

Hamlet in Hampshire, England

Coordinates: 51.138421°N 1.063742°W

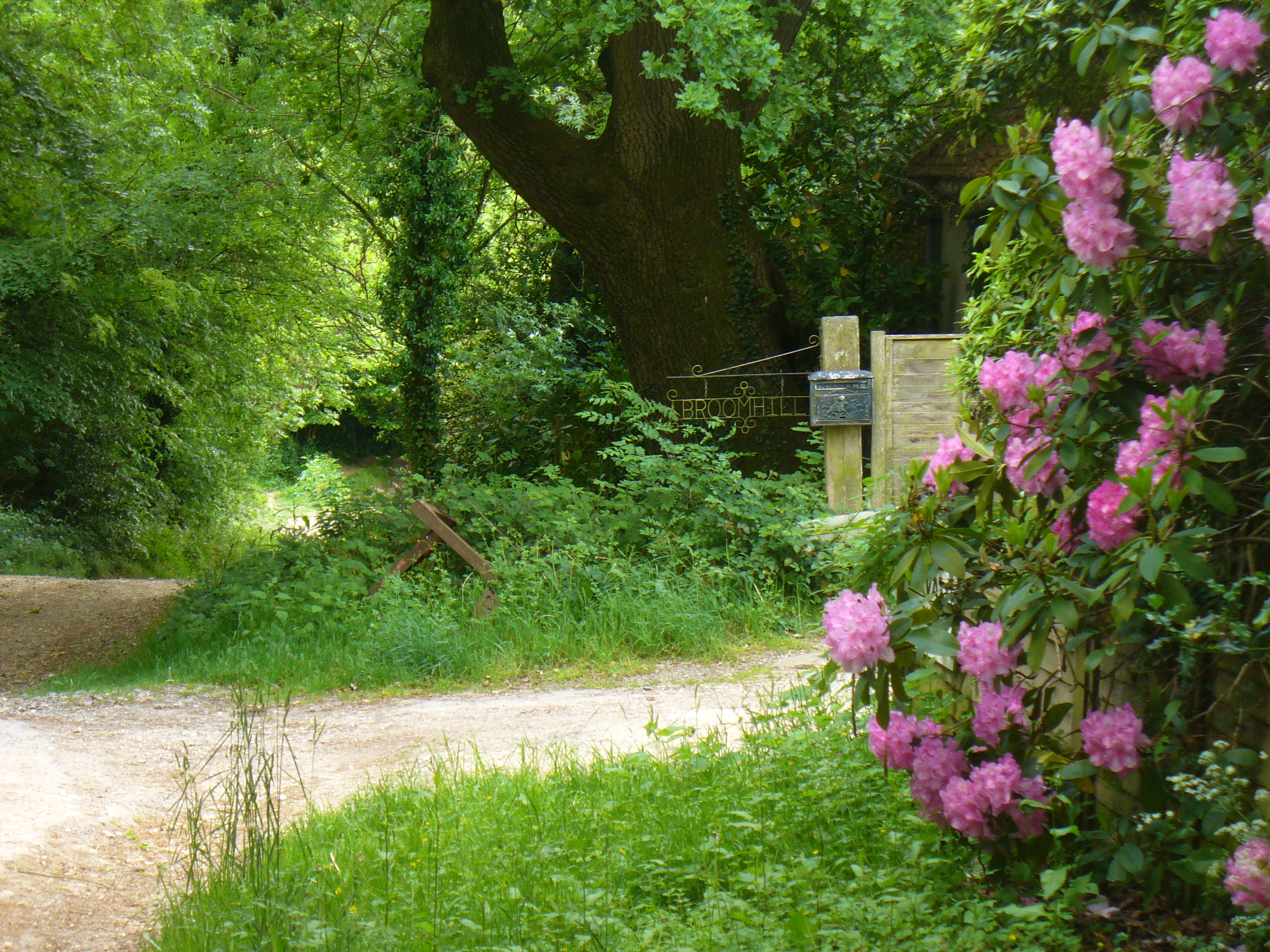
- Near Medstead Grange

- Location within Hampshire
- Population: 40
- OS grid reference: SU6755638427
- Civil parish: Bentworth
- District: East Hampshire
- Shire county: Hampshire
- Region: South East
- Country: England
- Sovereign state: United Kingdom
- Post town: Alton
- Postcode district: GU34
- Dialling code: 01420
- Police: Hampshire and Isle of Wight
- Fire: Hampshire and Isle of Wight
- Ambulance: South Central
- Website: http://www.bentworth.info

New Copse is a hamlet in the large civil parish of Bentworth in Hampshire, England. The nearest town is Alton, which lies approximately 3.7 miles (6.0 km) to the northeast. The hamlet is often confused with neighbouring Holt End, which also lies in Bentworth.

The nearest railway station is Alton which is 4.4 miles (7.1 km) to the northeast. Until 1932 it was the Bentworth and Lasham railway station on the Basingstoke and Alton Light Railway, until its closure.
