= Bentworth (disambiguation) =

Bentworth may refer to:

- Bentworth, a village in Hampshire
- Bentworth and Lasham railway station, a former railway station near the village
- Bentworth School District, a public school system serving Bentleyville, Ellsworth, Cokeburg, North Bethlehem Township and Somerset Township in Washington County, Pennsylvania.
