= Thedden =

Hamlet in Hampshire, England

Coordinates: 51.146555°N 1.0238951°W

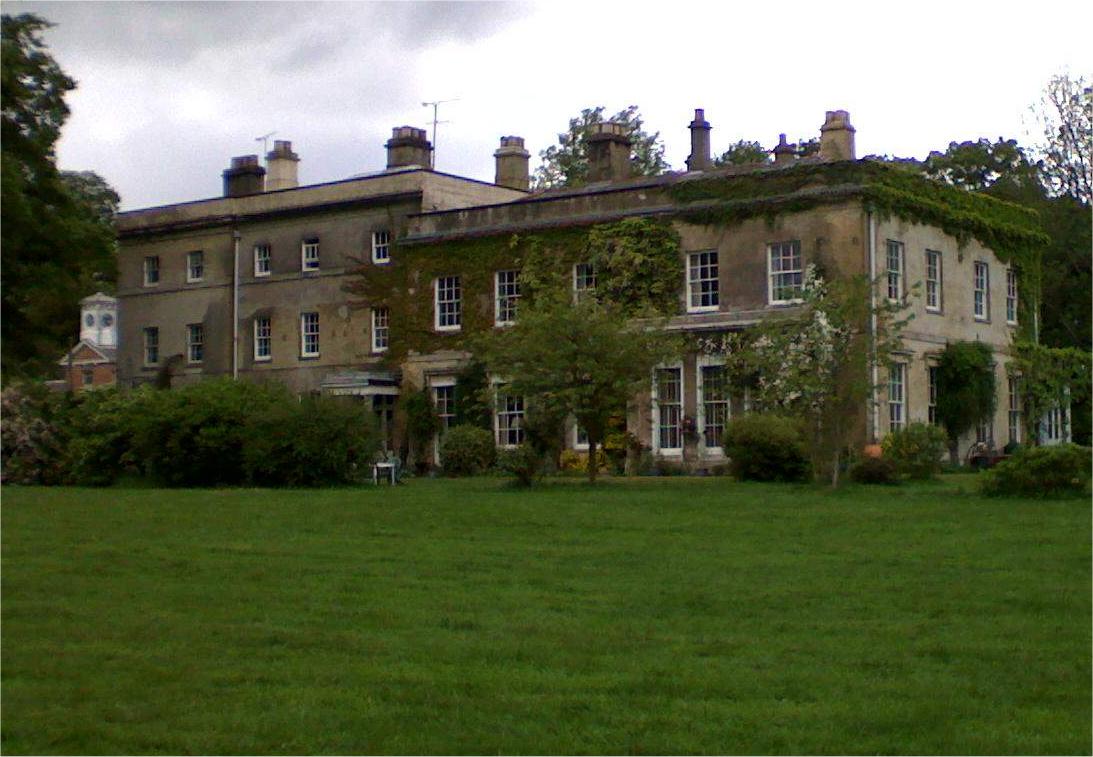
- Thedden Grange

- Location within Hampshire
- Population: 5
- OS grid reference: SU6837539041
- Civil parish: Bentworth
- District: East Hampshire
- Shire county: Hampshire
- Region: South East
- Country: England
- Sovereign state: United Kingdom
- Post town: Alton
- Postcode district: GU34
- Dialling code: 01420
- Police: Hampshire and Isle of Wight
- Fire: Hampshire and Isle of Wight
- Ambulance: South Central
- Website: http://www.bentworth.info

Thedden is a hamlet in the large civil parish of Bentworth in Hampshire, England, about 1.3 miles (2.1 km) south east of the centre of Bentworth village. Its nearest town is Alton, about 3.5 miles (5.1 km) east of Thedden.

Thedden Grange is a large country house, the area originally being part of the Bentworth Hall estate. During the Second World War it was used as a prisoner of war camp.

== Transport ==
The nearest railway station is Alton which is 3.5 miles (5 km) to the east. Until 1932 it was the Bentworth and Lasham railway station on the Basingstoke and Alton Light Railway, until its closure in 1932.
