= Ashley, East Hampshire =

Hamlet in Hampshire, England

Coordinates: 51.157062°N 1.074343°W

Ashley
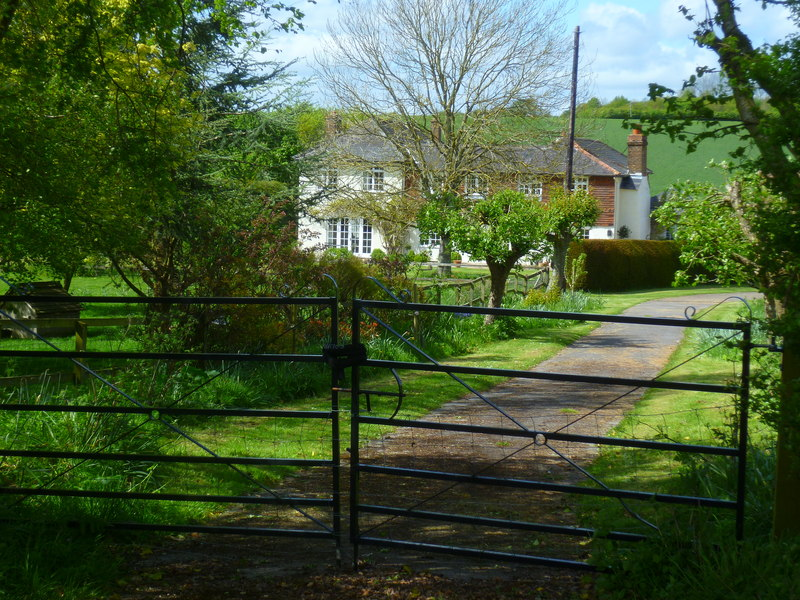
- Ashley Farm

- Location within Hampshire
- Population: 20
- OS grid reference: SU6483140164
- Civil parish: Bentworth
- District: East Hampshire
- Shire county: Hampshire
- Region: South East
- Country: England
- Sovereign state: United Kingdom
- Post town: Alton
- Postcode district: GU34
- Dialling code: 01420
- Police: Hampshire and Isle of Wight
- Fire: Hampshire and Isle of Wight
- Ambulance: South Central
- Website: http://www.bentworth.info

Ashley is a hamlet in the large civil parish of Bentworth in the East Hampshire district of Hampshire, England. Its nearest town is Alton, which lies approximately 4.3 miles (6.9 km) to the east.

Its nearest railway station was Bentworth and Lasham on the Basingstoke and Alton Light Railway, until its closure in 1932. The nearest station is now 3.6 miles (5.8 km) east of the village, at Alton.
