= Gaston Grange =

- Location within Hampshire

General information
- Location: Holt End, Hampshire, England
- Coordinates: 51.147°N 1.071°W
- Completed: Late 1800s

Technical details
- Size: 479 acres

Gaston Grange is a large country manor situated in the hamlet of Holt End in the large parish of Bentworth, Hampshire. It is about 1.1 miles (1.8 km) southwest of the centre of Bentworth and about 4.1 miles (6.6 km) west of Alton, its nearest town. The manor lies west of the Bentworth-Medstead road towards Upper Wield, south of Gaston Wood.

== History ==
The manor estate area was formerly part of the Bentworth Hall estate until the 1950s. In the late 19th century, Emma Gordon-Ives owned Bentworth Hall and in 1890 her son Colonel Gordon Maynard Gordon-Ives built Gaston Grange east of the current Bentworth Hall. In 1914, his son Lieutenant Colonel Alexander Gordon lived in Gaston Grange. He served in the First World War and was also a politician dealing with Northern Ireland matters, dying in July 1923.

After his death, the Bentworth Hall Estate was offered for sale by Messrs John D Wood & Co. and at this time consisted of 479 acres (194 ha). The house once had a grand ballroom which was removed in the 1920s. The white painted house has masonry walls, a timber pitched roof with what is likely Welsh blue grey slate, and a wooden staircase made by the Devon-based firm Dart & Francis. Gaston Grange has been extensively renovated in recent times.
