= Tickley =

Hamlet in Hampshire, England

Coordinates: 51.169980°N 1.0639572°W

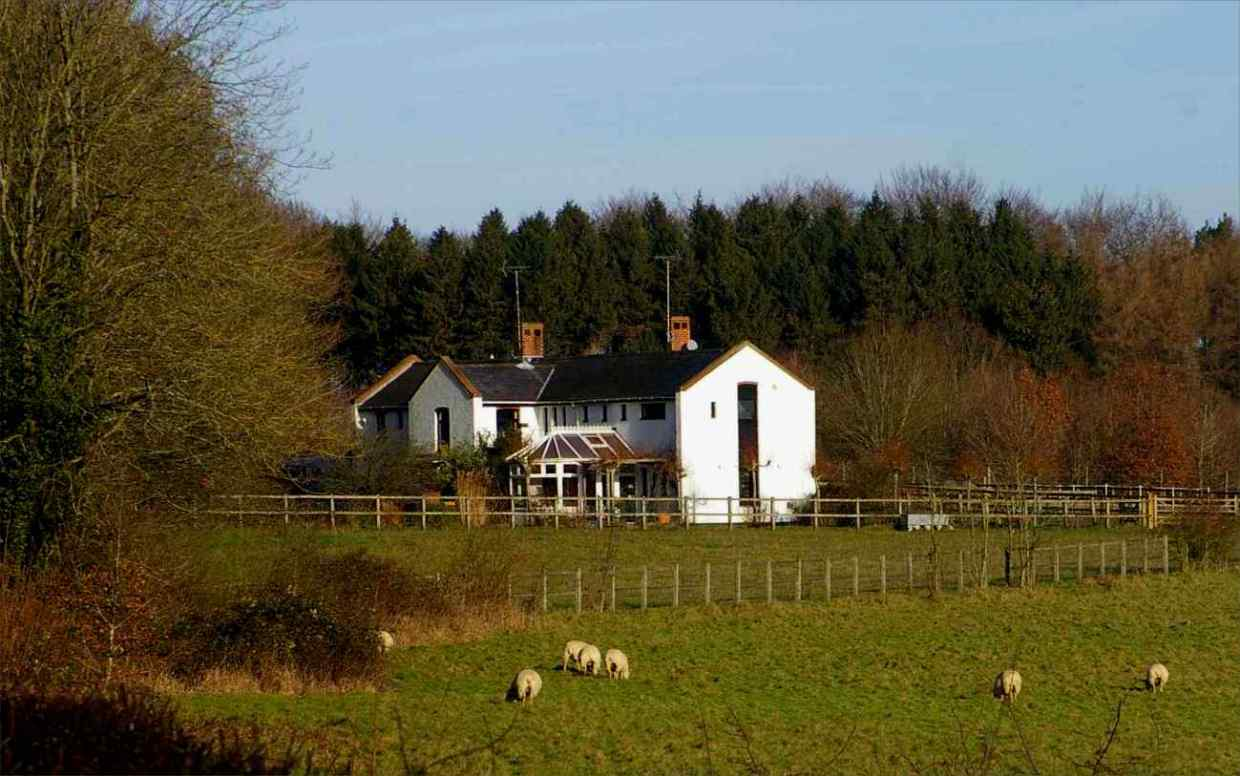
- Tickley House and surrounding sheep

- Location within Hampshire
- OS grid reference: SU 65539 41609
- Civil parish: Bentworth
- District: East Hampshire
- Shire county: Hampshire
- Region: South East
- Country: England
- Sovereign state: United Kingdom
- Post town: Alton
- Postcode district: GU34
- Dialling code: 01420
- Police: Hampshire and Isle of Wight
- Fire: Hampshire and Isle of Wight
- Ambulance: South Central
- Website: http://bentworth.org.uk (parish)

Tickley is a small hamlet in the large civil parish of Bentworth in Hampshire, England. It is considered a part of neighbouring Burkham which is situated 1.2 miles (1.9 km) away; however, it is an individual settlement.

The nearest town is Alton, which lies about 4.2 miles (6.9 km) to the south-east. Its nearest railway station was formerly the Bentworth and Lasham railway station on the Basingstoke and Alton Light Railway, until its closure in 1932. The nearest railway station is now 3.6 miles (5.8 km) east of the village, at Alton.
