= Wivelrod Manor =

Country house in Hampshire, England

- Location within Hampshire

General information
- Location: Wivelrod, Hampshire, England
- Coordinates: 51.141135°N 1.03571°W
- Completed: Late 18th century

Wivelrod Manor is a country house in the hamlet of Wivelrod, about 2.5 miles (4.0 km) south of centre of the Bentworth civil parish in Hampshire. It is 3.2 miles (5.1 km) southeast of Alton, its nearest town, where it neighbours Alton Abbey. It was part of the Bentworth Hall estate until 1832, when divested by new owner Roger Staples Fisher.
