= Wivelrod =

Hamlet in Hampshire, England

Coordinates: 51.141135°N 1.03571°W

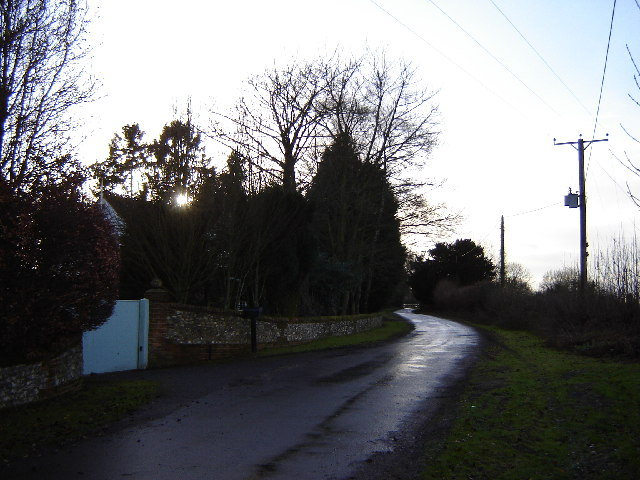
- Cottages in Wivelrod

- Location within Hampshire
- OS grid reference: SU6755638427
- Civil parish: Bentworth
- District: East Hampshire
- Shire county: Hampshire
- Region: South East
- Country: England
- Sovereign state: United Kingdom
- Post town: Alton
- Postcode district: GU34
- Dialling code: 01420
- Police: Hampshire and Isle of Wight
- Fire: Hampshire and Isle of Wight
- Ambulance: South Central
- Website: http://www.bentworth.info

Wivelrod is a hamlet in the large civil parish of Bentworth in Hampshire, England. The nearest town is Alton, about 2.8 miles (4.5 km) to the east. At a spot height of 712 feet (217 m), it is one of the highest settlements in Hampshire.

The nearest railway station is Alton which is 3.5 miles (5.6 km) to the east. Until 1932 it was the Bentworth and Lasham railway station on the Basingstoke and Alton Light Railway.

The area was inhabited in ancient times and some Tumuli and Burial Mounds are on Wivelrod Hill. Also, at Wivelrod House, finds include Pottery, bone objects, spindle-whorls (stone discs with a hole in the middle used in spinning thread) and fragments of Roman roofing tiles.

== Geography and demographics ==
Wivelrod lies in the northwestern part of the East Hampshire district of Hampshire in South East England, 5.4 miles (8.7 km) southeast of Alton, its nearest town. It is in the parish of Bentworth, which covers an area of 3,763 acres (1,523 ha). Wivelrod is among the highest settlements in Hampshire and has a spot height of 716 feet (218 m) above sea level. The landscape surrounding the hamlet mostly consists of high downland with woods and plantations. Notable woods in the vicinity include Colliers Wood, Childer Hill Copse, and North. Alton Abbey lies approximately 0.5 miles (0.80 km) away from the centre of the hamlet, and a Roman building is also situated near Wivelrod House.

According to the 2011 census Bentworth had a population of 553 people, of which 33.30% of them were in full-time employment, somewhat lower than the national average of 37.70%. In addition, the parish contains 221 households with an average size of 2.62 people. Wivelrod is not listed individually in the census.

=== Climate ===
Due to its location in south central England and its proximity to the sea, the average maximum temperature in January is 7.2 °C (45 °F) with the average minimum being 1.6 °C (35 °F). The average maximum temperature in July is 21.9 °C (71 °F), with the average minimum being 12.5 °C (55 °F). The village gets around 755 millimetres (29.7 in) of rain a year, with a minimum of 1 mm (0.04 in) of rain reported on 103 days a year.

Climate data for Odiham weather station (nearest to Wivelrod), Odiham, elevation: 9 metres (30 feet) (1981–2010)
Month	Jan	Feb	Mar	Apr	May	Jun	Jul	Aug	Sep	Oct	Nov	Dec	Year
Mean daily maximum °C (°F)	7.2 (45.0)	7.4 (45.3)	10.3 (50.5)	13.0 (55.4)	16.6 (61.9)	19.5 (67.1)	21.9 (71.4)	21.6 (70.9)	18.5 (65.3)	14.4 (57.9)	10.3 (50.5)	7.4 (45.3)	14.1 (57.4)
Mean daily minimum °C (°F)	1.6 (34.9)	1.3 (34.3)	3.0 (37.4)	4.4 (39.9)	7.5 (45.5)	10.4 (50.7)	12.5 (54.5)	12.4 (54.3)	10.2 (50.4)	7.4 (45.3)	4.2 (39.6)	1.8 (35.2)	6.4 (43.5)
Average precipitation mm (inches)	77.8 (3.06)	56.0 (2.20)	54.8 (2.16)	52.6 (2.07)	52.2 (2.06)	48.5 (1.91)	50.2 (1.98)	52.1 (2.05)	61.8 (2.43)	87.2 (3.43)	83.9 (3.30)	78.5 (3.09)	755.5 (29.74)
Average precipitation days	12.2	9.8	10.5	9.5	9.5	8.6	8.4	8.6	8.9	11.7	11.7	11.5	120.9
Source: Met Office
