= Thedden Grange =

Country house in Hampshire, England

Coordinates: 51.147°N 1.022°W

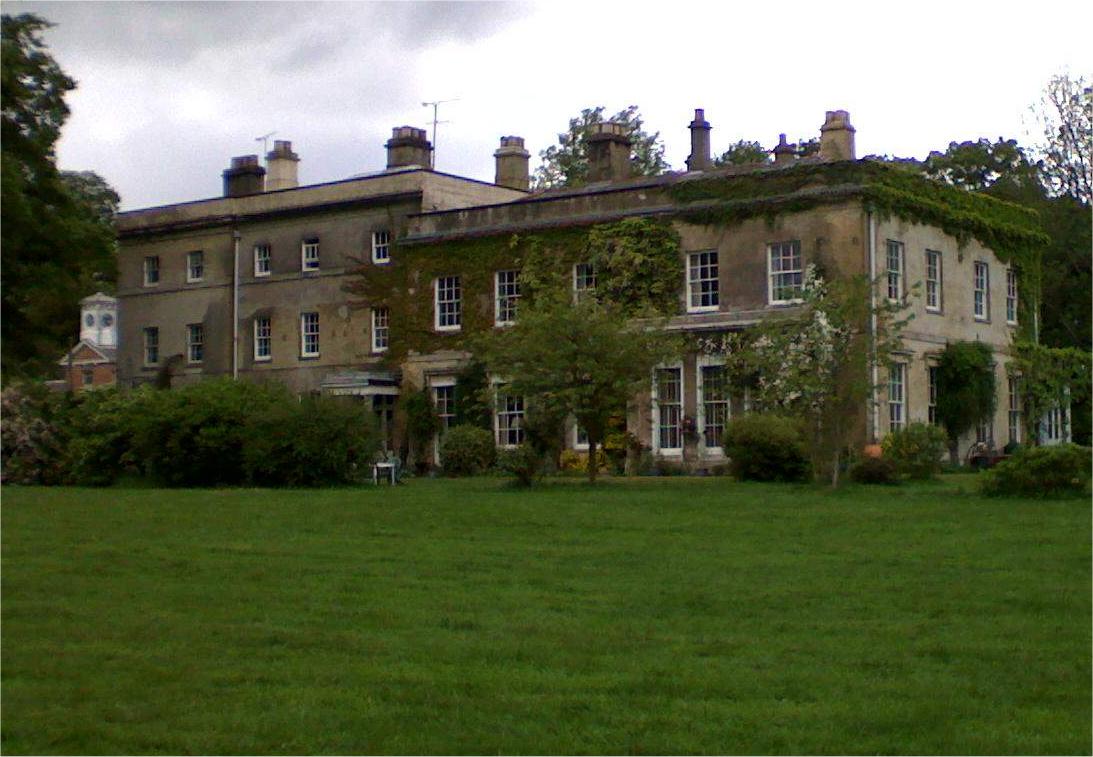
South-facing view of Thedden Grange

Thedden Grange is a privately owned country house and estate in the civil parish of Bentworth, on the outskirts of Alton, Hampshire, England. Since renovation in the mid-1970s the original house, outbuildings and land have been divided into seven separate properties plus additional flats.

The house and grounds have been used as locations in a number of films and television programmes. The estate covers 40 acres of land, among which are 9 acres of ornamental garden.

== History ==
Thedden has a long history going back to at least the 15th century, when it is recorded that William Estone paid rent for lands at the manor. In the 19th century Thedden Grange was owned by industrialist John Wood. During the Second World War the house was used as a prisoner of war camp (number 294).
