= St Mary's Church, Bentworth =

St Mary's Church
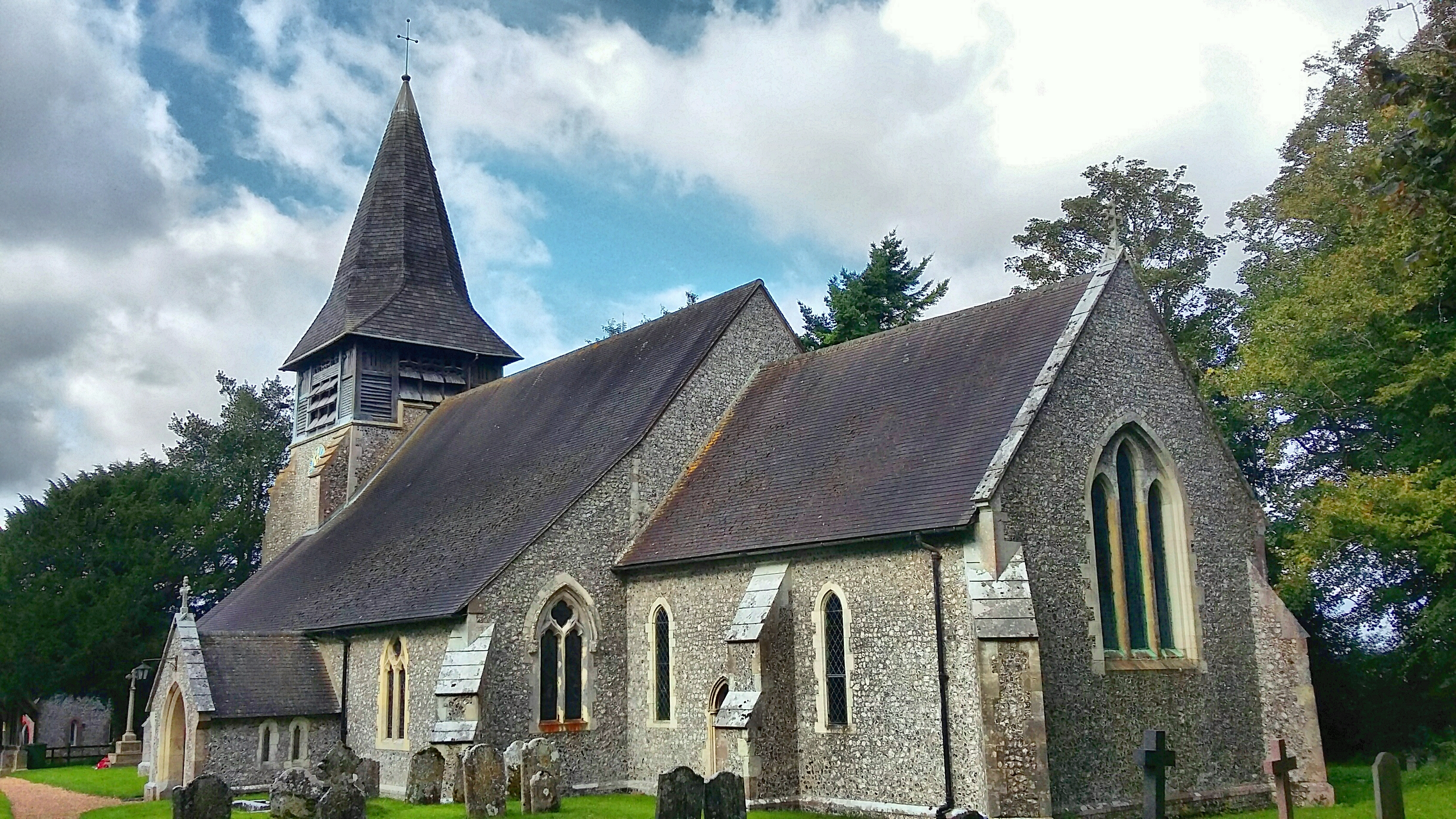
- The church from the north-east

- Location within Hampshire

General information
- Location: Bentworth, England
- Coordinates: 51.15643°N 1.05063°W
- Construction started: 10th century
- Completed: 11th century

St Mary's Church is an Anglican church situated in the centre of the village of Bentworth, within the East Hampshire district of Hampshire, England. The church lies immediately east of Bentworth's primary school and north-east of the Star Inn on the main road through the village.

Parts of the church date from the 11th century and it is a Grade II* listed building.

== History ==
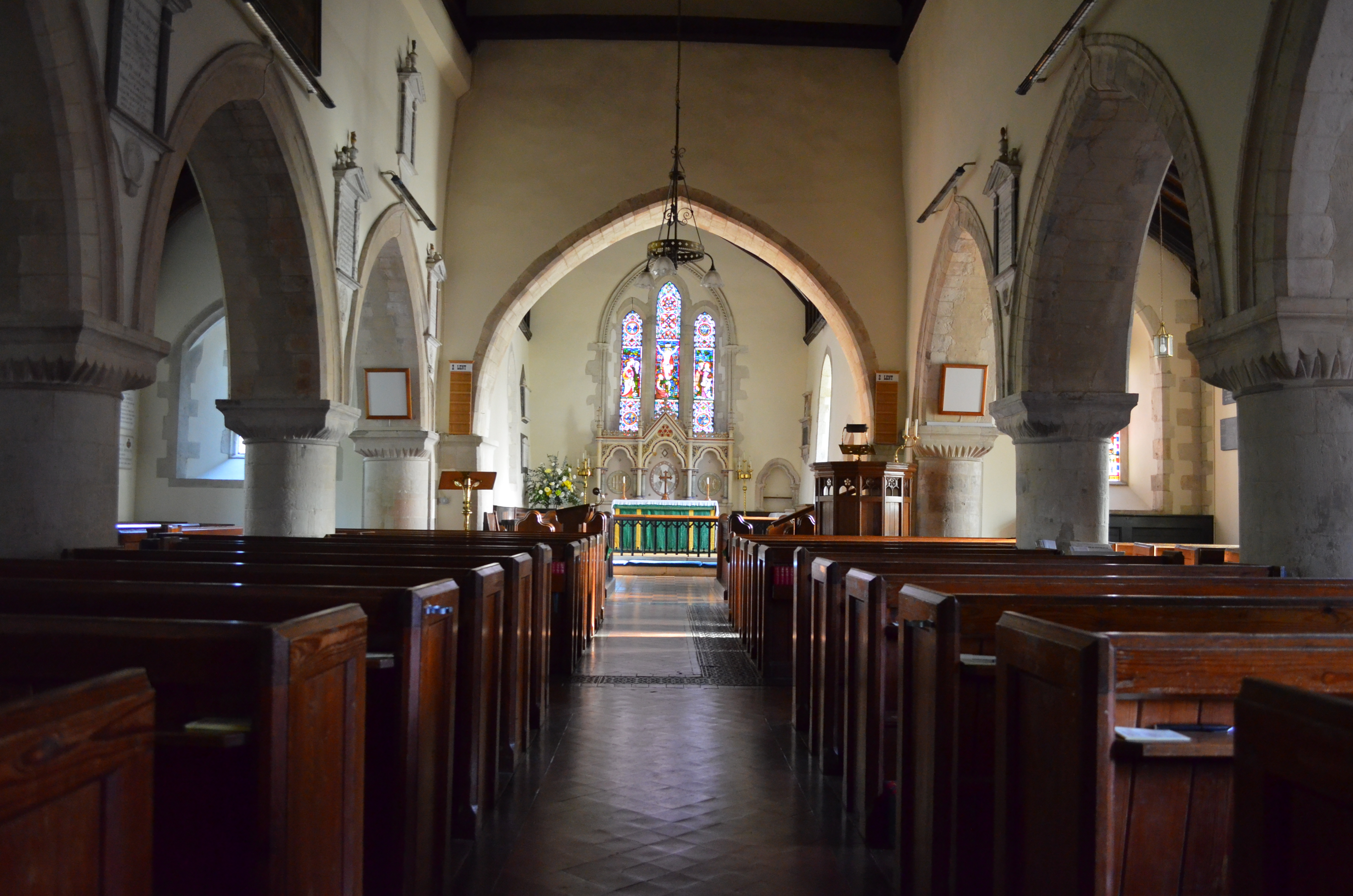
Church interior

There is evidence to suggest that a Saxon church was located here and was rebuilt. The present church has a chancel (the space around the altar for the clergy and choir) that is 27 feet (8.2 m) by 17 feet 4 inches (5.28 m), with a north vestry 48 feet 7 inches (14.81 m) by 17 feet (5.2 m). The nave roof and chancel arch probably date from the late 12th century and the chancel itself was built in about 1260 together with the lower part of the tower. However, in 1608 the church suffered a "fire happening by lightning from heaven" and some of the earlier structure was damaged.

The present church has flint walls with stone dressings and stepped buttresses, a plinth, and corbelled tracer lights in the nave. The west tower was rebuilt in 1890 and has diagonal buttresses with an elaborate arrangement of steps (some with gabled ornamentation), and at the top is a timber turret, surmounted by a broach spire. A small mural monument at the south-east of the chancel is to Nicholas Holdip, "pastor of the parish" 1606. In the north aisle wall is another mural tablet to "Robert Hunt of Hall Place in this Parish", 1671, with the arms, Azure a bend between two water bougets or with three leopards' heads gules on the bend. The crest is a talbot sitting chained to a halberd. There are four bells; the treble and second by Joseph Carter, 1601, the third by Henry Knight, 1615, and the tenor by Joseph Carter, 1607. The church became a Grade: II* listed building on 31 July 1963.

=== Memorials ===
Ives' plaque inside the church on the north wall

In Elizabethan times, the poet and writer George Wither (1588–1667) was born in Bentworth and baptised in St. Mary's church.

In Victorian times, the author and gay rights campaigner George Cecil Ives lived at the post-1832 Bentworth Hall with his mother Emma Gordon-Ives. A memorial to the Ives family is in the churchyard close to the school and has a stone slab for George Ives that reads "George Cecil Ives MA, Author, 1867–1950, Late of Bentworth Hall." There is also a plaque for members of the Ives family inside the church on the north wall.

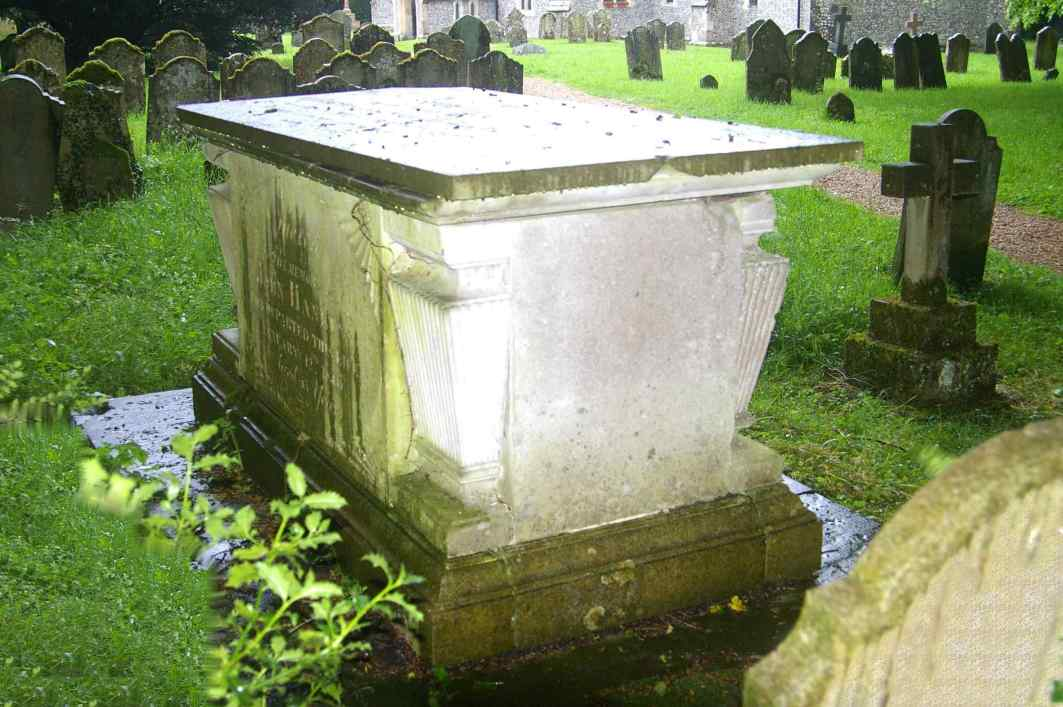
The Hankin family tomb with the church in the background

The Hankin Family Tomb in the churchyard, was Grade II listed in 2005. It was made in 1816 of Portland stone and is a "rectangular chest tomb on a moulded base, with a two-part cover consisting of a low hipped top slab and lower moulded cornice." The panels at the sides contain various inscriptions including the one on the south panel which reads: "Sacred to the memory of John Hankin who departed this life January 12th 1816, aged 55 years", and the one on the north side which reads: "Sacred to the memory of Elizabeth, widow of John Hankin, who departed this life September 13th 1831, aged 67 years."

The churchyard contains two registered Commonwealth war graves, a soldier of the East Surrey Regiment of World War I, and a Royal Navy officer of World War II.
