= Holt End, Hampshire =

Hamlet in Hampshire, England

Coordinates: 51.141596°N 1.063979°W

Holt End
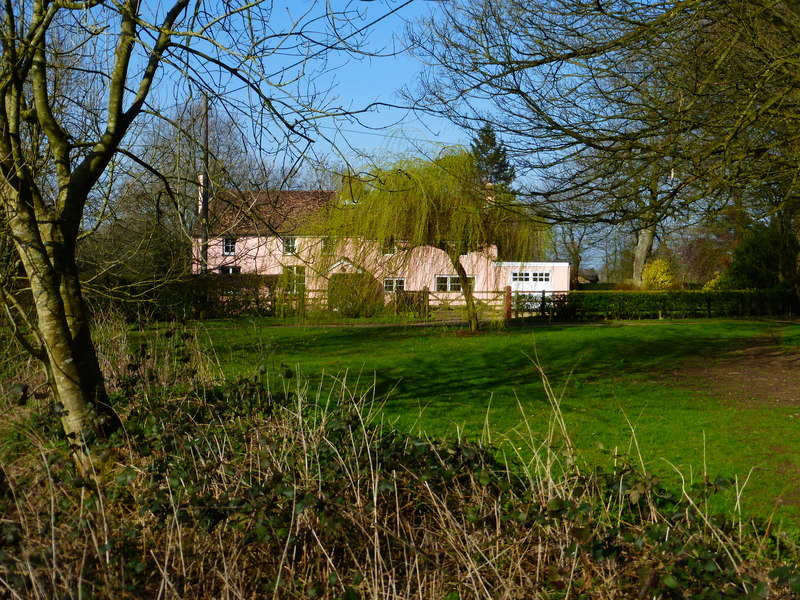
- Housing on Holt End Lane

- Location within Hampshire
- Population: 18
- OS grid reference: SU6557838453
- Civil parish: Bentworth
- District: East Hampshire
- Shire county: Hampshire
- Region: South East
- Country: England
- Sovereign state: United Kingdom
- Post town: Alton
- Postcode district: GU34 5
- Dialling code: 01420
- Police: Hampshire and Isle of Wight
- Fire: Hampshire and Isle of Wight
- Ambulance: South Central
- Website: http://www.bentworth.info

Holt End is a hamlet in the large civil parish of Bentworth in Hampshire, England, between Bentworth and Medstead. The nearest town is Alton, which lies approximately 4 miles (6.4 km) north-east from the hamlet.

The word Holt means a small grove of trees, copse, or wood, and Holt End means the end of a wood.

The nearest railway station is Alton which is 4 miles (6 km) to the east. Until 1932 it was the Bentworth and Lasham railway station on the Basingstoke and Alton Light Railway, until its closure.
