= Sheat Manor =

Manor on the Isle of Wight, England

Coordinates: 50.6580°N 1.3029°W

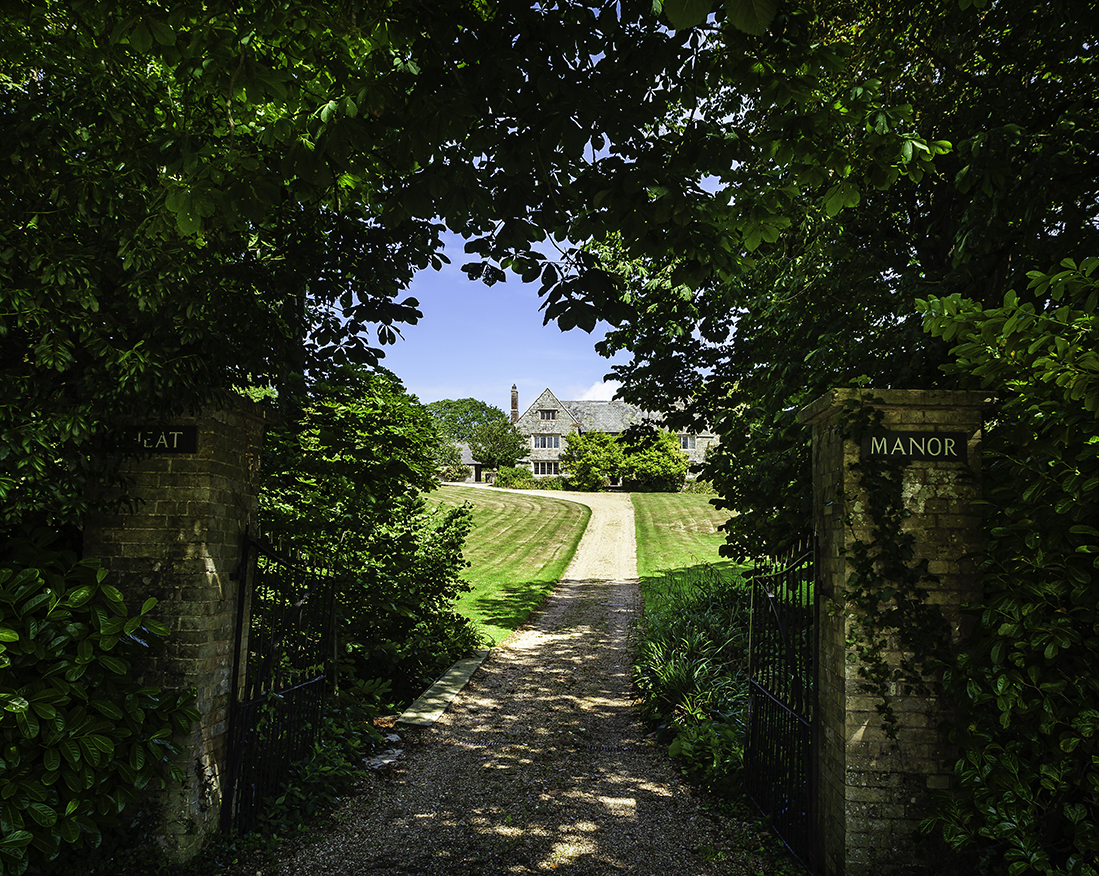

Sheat Manor is a manor house in Chillerton, on the Isle of Wight, England. Considered to be one of the island's antiquities, Sheat manor house, is a fine old gabled mansion now used as a farmhouse. It has a pond and swans. It contains some interesting Jacobite carving. Sheat was one of the few properties whose Anglo-Saxon owner, Alaric, was not disturbed by the Norman invasion. It was run by the Urry family for some time.
