= Bentworth and Lasham railway station =

Disused railway station in East Hampshire, England

Bentworth & Lasham

General information
- Location: Bentworth and Lasham, East Hampshire; England
- Coordinates: 51.1705°N 1.044°W
- Grid reference: SU669417
- Platforms: 1

Other information
- Status: Disused

History
- Original company: Basingstoke and Alton Light Railway
- Pre-grouping: London and South Western Railway

Key dates
- 1 June 1901: Opened
- 1 January 1917: Closed
- 18 August 1924: Reopened
- 12 September 1932: Closed to passenger traffic
- 1 June 1936: Closed to goods traffic
Location

Bentworth and Lasham railway station in Hampshire, England was on the Basingstoke and Alton Light Railway between the villages of Bentworth to the south and Lasham to the north.

== History ==
The Basingstoke and Alton Light Railway opened on 1 June 1901, and Bentworth and Lasham station opened the same day. A wind engine designed by John Wallis Titt, supplied the station buildings and cottages with power.

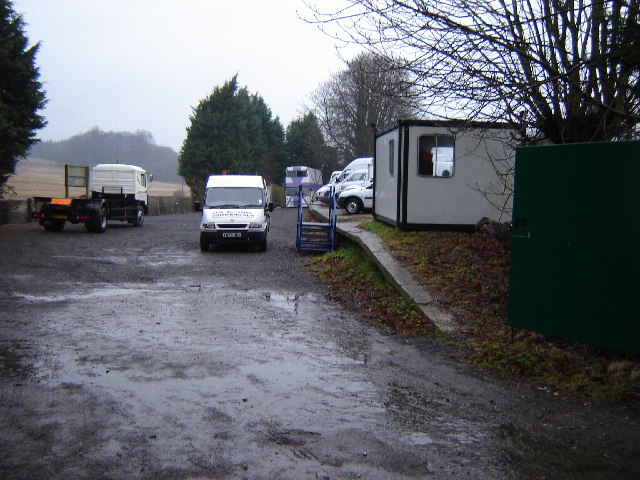
The remains of the station in 2006

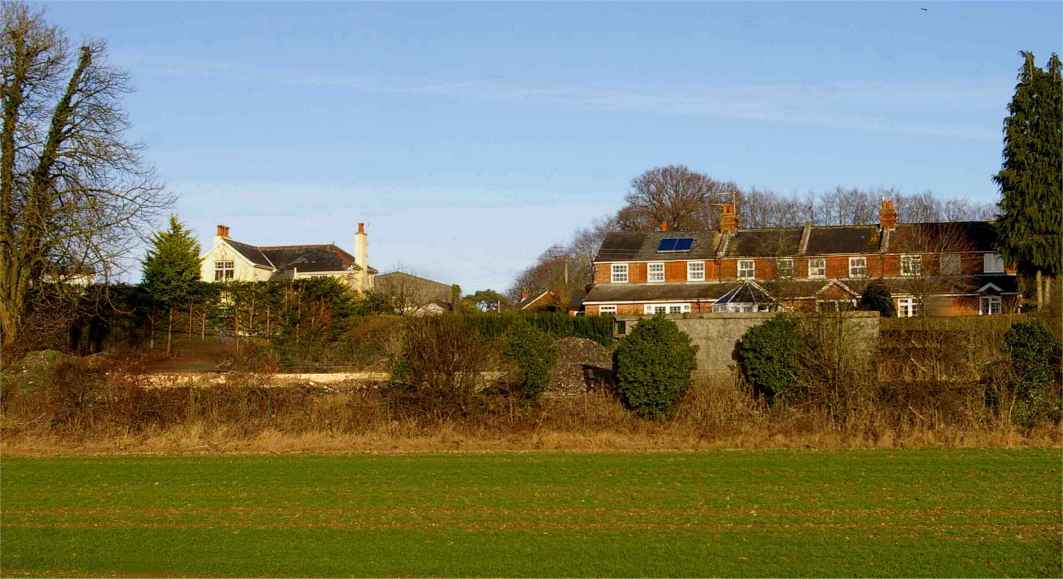
The area of the station in 2012. The light horizontal line under the foreman's house on the left is the remains of the platform

The station and railway were closed on 1 January 1917 because it was on a minor line and the rails were taken up for re-use elsewhere.

Following the 1914–18 war, permission was sought to abandon the line because it had been unprofitable, but this was refused by Parliament; instead, the Southern Railway agreed to rebuild the line for a ten-year trial. The light railway and station re-opened on 18 August 1924. It was featured in the 1929 film The Wrecker.

On 12 September 1932, the station was closed to passengers, the line being used for goods until its final closure in June 1936. The corrugated-iron platform building and waiting room survived until its demolition in 2003, and as of January 2012 the remains of the platform edge can still be seen.

Preceding station	Disused railways	Following station
Herriard; Line and station closed	London and South Western Railway; Basingstoke and Alton Light Railway	Treloar's Hospital Platform; Line and station closed
