= The Wrecker (play) =

Play by Arnold Ridley and Bernard Merivale

The Wrecker is a British play, written in 1924 by Arnold Ridley and Bernard Merivale, and filmed in 1928-29.

The play is about an old engine driver who thinks his engine is malevolent and self-aware. The finale is a huge train wreck using elaborate stage special-effects as per The Ghost Train, an earlier play by Ridley. The Wrecker ran for 165 performances at St Martin's Theatre in London's West End. It later played at the Cort Theatre on Broadway in 1928, where it ran for 40 performances.

The play was adapted as a film under the same title released in 1929. It featured a spectacular crash between a passenger train and a Foden steam lorry stuck on a level crossing. The scene was filmed at Herriard on the Basingstoke and Alton Light Railway, in one take, and destroyed both the steam wagon and the SECR F1 Class locomotive.
