= The Flying Fool =

The Flying Fool may refer to:

- The Flying Fool (1925 film), an American silent film starring Gaston Glass
- The Flying Fool (1929 film), an American film starring William Boyd
- The Flying Fool (1931 film), a British film starring Henry Kendall
- The Flying Fool (play), a play by Arnold Ridley and Bernard Merivale

== See also ==
- Those Fantastic Flying Fools, 1967 British film starring Burl Ives
