= Blondie White =

1937 play

- Original language: English
- Written by: Bernard Merivale; Jeffrey Dell
- Genre: Mystery

Premiere
- Date: 4 October 1937
- Place: Manchester Opera House

Blondie White is a 1937 mystery play by British writer Jeffrey Dell and Bernard Merivale. A murder mystery, it was inspired by an earlier play by Hungarian writer Ladislas Fodor. A famous crime novelist helps Scotland Yard to solve the murder of a nightclub performer, Blondie White.

After premiering at the Manchester Opera House, it transferred to Globe Theatre in London's West End. The cast included Basil Sydney, Basil Radford, Joan Marion, and Elliott Mason. It was directed by Harold French.

== Adaptation ==
In 1941, the play was adapted by Hollywood studio Warner Bros. into the film Footsteps in the Dark, directed by Lloyd Bacon and starring Errol Flynn, Brenda Marshall, and Ralph Bellamy. The company initially acquired the rights to the play with an idea to shooting it at their British Teddington Studios, but it was eventually made in Hollywood with the setting switched from London to New York.

== Bibliography ==
- Goble, Alan. The Complete Index to Literary Sources in Film. Walter de Gruyter, 1999.
- Kabatchnik, Amnon. Blood on the Stage, 1925-1950: Milestone Plays of Crime, Mystery, and Detection : an Annotated Repertoire. Scarecrow Press, 2010.
- Wearing, J.P. The London Stage 1930-1939: A Calendar of Productions, Performers, and Personnel. Rowman & Littlefield, 2014.
