= Incidents at the Watercress Line =

Railway incidents on the Watercress Line in Hampshire, England

Coordinates: 51°9′5.18″N 0°58′1.09″W

The Watercress Line is a heritage railway in Hampshire, England, running 10 miles (16 km) from New Alresford to Alton where it connects to the National Rail network. The line has four stations and operates scheduled and special services. The line was opened as the Mid-Hants Railway in 1865 and was purchased by the London & South Western Railway in 1884.

The line was closed by British Rail in 1973 and sold to the present operator Mid-Hants Railway Ltd in 1975. The first section of the line between Alresford and Ropley was reopened in 1977, with the section to Medstead & Four Marks in 1983 and via Butts Junction to Alton in 1985. This article records a number of accidents and incidents on the line when operating as a heritage railway.

== Derailment at Ropley, 2006 ==
On 25 July 2006, the leading bogie of the BR Class 117 DMU forming the 10:50 service from Alton to Alresford derailed on points approaching Platform 2 at Ropley Station. The train was stopped within 20 metres of the point of derailment by an instructor who was in the cab with the driver. There were no injuries as a result of the incident and the train and track suffered limited damage.

The immediate cause of the incident was the reversal of the points by the signalman at Ropley Signal box at the same time as the leading wheels of the train were passing over them. Causal factors were the confusion by the signalman about the exact location of the train and the lack of train-detection on the points, allowing them to be moved under a train.

The RAIB has made six recommendations aimed at:

- the provision of train detection on points;
- the operating of the electric token block system;
- the safety management system;
- the competence and medical standards for staff.

Since the accident, a new signal box has been opened at Ropley, with full interlocking, which will prevent a repeat of this incident. Also, fouling bars have been installed to prevent points being moved (when the Facing Point Lock is not in use).

== Passenger fatality at Alresford, 2007 ==
On 1 December 2007, a passenger fell from the platform at Alresford as he tried to board a departing train. It is believed that Michael Kerry, 62, of Redbridge, Southampton, fell onto the platform and was dragged under the train on Saturday night just after 10 pm as he was about to board the Real Ale Train.

The PA system was not working in the carriage in which he was travelling. As a result, he missed an announcement asking passengers not to leave the train at the second Alresford stop as it was running late.

As the train was pulling out of the station, Mr. Kerry ran to get onto the train while it was moving. Despite shouts for him to stand clear by the guard and other people on the platform, he managed to open a door but lost his footing and was dragged under the train. The train was stopped by the guard using the emergency brake and the Emergency Services were called by the signalman. The post mortem concluded that Mr. Kerry was killed by multiple crush injuries. He was declared dead at the scene. The coroner concluded that the death was accidental and that he was satisfied that the emergency procedures, put in place by the Mid-Hants Railway, were safe and worked.

== Fire in the Carriage & Wagon workshop at Ropley, 2010 ==
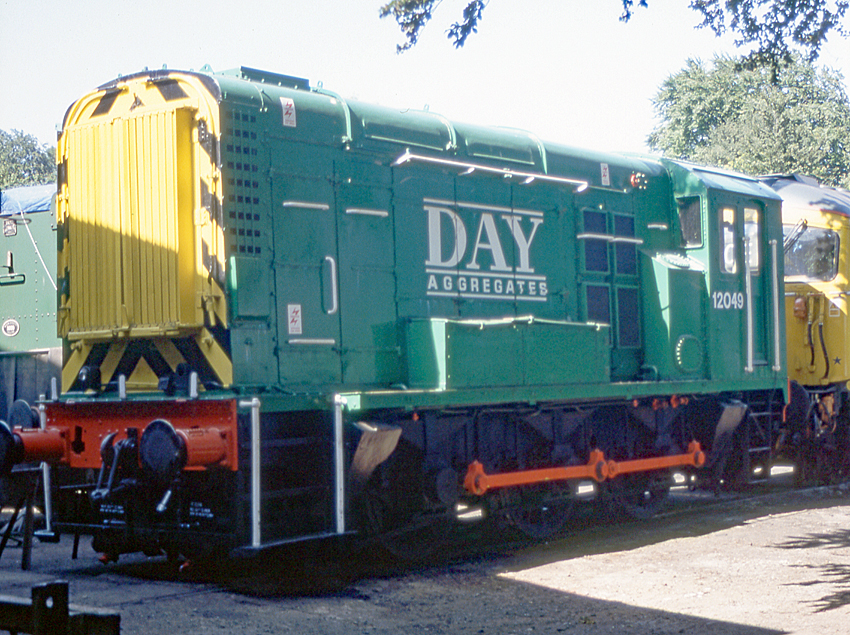
12049 in Day Aggregates livery, destroyed in a fire at Ropley

On 26 July 2010, a major fire occurred in the newly constructed Carriage & Wagon workshop at Ropley. The fire service found the cause of the fire to be an electrical fault and estimated that 50% of the building had been destroyed. Nobody was injured in the accident. The adjacent Boiler Shop was not touched by the blaze as the building's fire door was closed, however its contents did sustain minor smoke damage.

A vintage wooden LSWR restaurant carriage, a British Railways Mark 1 carriage (Tourist Second Open, S4712), 12049 – a British Rail Class 11 diesel shunter, and the tender of U-Class 31806 were inside the shed at the time. The carriages and diesel shunter were irreparably damaged and were subsequently scrapped, but the tender was repaired and reunited with 31806. In addition, tools and equipment were lost in the fire. Fortunately, the building and its contents were covered by insurance and the Mid Hants Railway estimate that the rebuilding of the Carriage and Wagon Shed and the remedial work to the Boiler Shop would be completed by February 2011. The knock-on effect of the loss of the facility put restoration work back by two years.

The Carriage & Wagon shop has since been rebuilt, the Boiler Shop repaired, and restoration work has recommenced.
