= The Unguarded Hour (play) =

1935 play

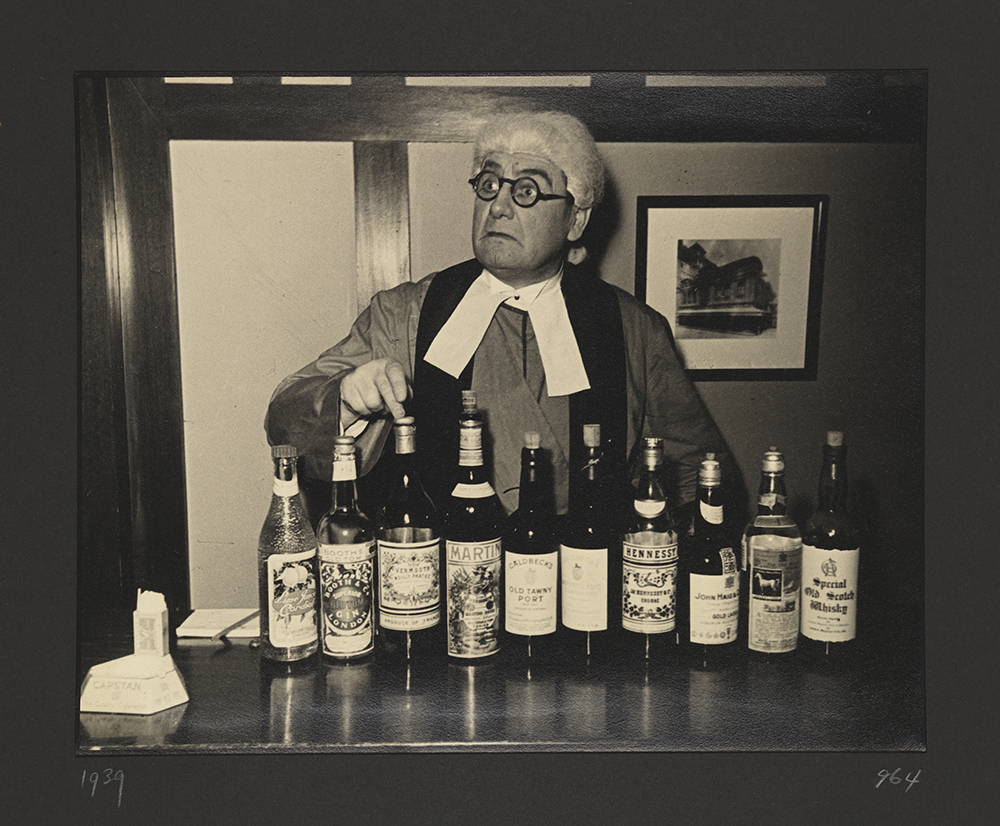
- From a 1939 production
- Original language: English
- Written by: Bernard Merivale
- Genre: Drama
- Setting: London

Premiere
- Date: 1935

The Unguarded Hour is a 1935 play by Bernard Merivale, inspired by a Hungarian work by Ladislas Fodor.

It ran for 140 performances in the West End between 31 July and 30 November 1935, originally at Daly's Theatre before transferring first to the Phoenix Theatre and then to the Playhouse. The cast included Godfrey Tearle and Malcolm Keen. In 1939 it was staged at the Pasadena Playhouse.

== Adaptation ==
The following year it was adapted into a Hollywood film The Unguarded Hour directed by Sam Wood and starring Loretta Young and Franchot Tone.

== Bibliography ==
- Goble, Alan. The Complete Index to Literary Sources in Film. Walter de Gruyter, 1999.
- Kabatchnik, Amnon. Blood on the Stage, 1925-1950: Milestone Plays of Crime, Mystery and Detection. Scarecrow Press, 2010.
- Wearing, J.P. The London Stage 1930-1939: A Calendar of Productions, Performers, and Personnel. Rowman & Littlefield, 2014.
