= The Unguarded Hour =

1936 film by Sam Wood

- Directed by: Sam Wood
- Written by: Howard Emmett Rogers; Leon Gordon; Horace Jackson (uncredited contributor)
- Based on: The Unguarded Hour; 1935 play by: Bernard Merivale; inspired by a Hungarian play by Ladislas Fodor
- Produced by: Lawrence Weingarten; Sam Wood
- Starring: Loretta Young; Franchot Tone; Roland Young
- Cinematography: James Van Trees
- Edited by: Frank E. Hull
- Music by: William Axt
- Production company: Metro-Goldwyn-Mayer
- Distributed by: Loew's Inc.
- Release date: April 10, 1936
- Running time: 87 minutes
- Country: United States
- Language: English

The Unguarded Hour is a 1936 American drama film directed by Sam Wood and starring Loretta Young, Franchot Tone and Roland Young. In England, a prominent young prosecutor in a murder trial is unaware that his wife is involved.

It is based on Bernard Merivale's 1935 play The Unguarded Hour, an adaptation of an earlier Hungarian work by Ladislas Fodor. Some changes were made from the play in order to heighten the drama, including having the heroine as the elusive witness in connection with the trial. The film's set designs were overseen by Cedric Gibbons, assisted by Edwin B. Willis and Joseph Wright. Dolly Tree designed the costumes.

== Plot ==
Barrister Sir Alan Dearden is tipped to be Britain's next and youngest ever Attorney General. Shortly before he leaves for holiday on the Continent, his wife Helen is approached by a man claiming to have love letters written by her husband to his own estranged wife. Although these pre-date their marriage, Lady Helen worries that scandal would ruin her husband's career and reluctantly agrees to pay the blackmail demand of £2,000. The following day, she draws the money out of the bank and meets the blackmailer in Dover, eventually leaving the money on the White Cliffs. While she is recovering the love letters, she sees a middle-aged man warning his wife not to go too near the edge.

She is enjoying her holiday with her husband when he is urgently called back to London to take over a murder case at the Old Bailey. A man named Metford stands accused of pushing his wife over a cliff. A shocked Helen realises that she is the key witness in the case but elects to remain silent. During cross-examination, Dearden hounds Metford over his claims that there was a female witness who saw him warning his wife to take care by pointing out a nationwide hunt has not produced this supposed witness. Helen does what she can to persuade her husband that Metford is innocent and that people often make poor witnesses when they are telling the truth, but he is unmoved.

Then, during the trial, Dearden is approached by his former flame —- encouraged by her estranged husband —- who demands blackmail money from him. When shortly afterwards she is found murdered, Scotland Yard investigate and find suspicion is pointed at Dearden. While he has a genuine excuse of how she spent the "unguarded hour", his story sounds as unbelievable as Metford's.

In a sensational development, Lady Helen is subpoenaed by the defence in order to clear the accused, which she does. Dearden then in court is accused of murder in court of his former flame. Lady Helen then convinces the blackmailer to give her husband an alibi for self defense which he does but it's a trap to reveal he is the real murderer.

== Cast ==
- Loretta Young as Lady Helen Dudley Dearden
- Franchot Tone as Sir Alan Dearden
- Lewis Stone as General Lawrence
- Roland Young as William 'Bunny' Jeffers
- Jessie Ralph as Lady Agatha Hathaway
- Dudley Digges as Samuel Metford
- Henry Daniell as Hugh Lewis
- Robert Greig as Henderson
- E. E. Clive as Lord Henry Hathaway
- Wallis Clark as Inspector Grainger
- John Buckler as Defense Counsel
- Aileen Pringle as Diana Roggers
- Ottola Nesmith as Mrs. Samuel Metford
- Viva Tattersall as Eloise Cameron
- Crauford Kent as Inspector Thorpe
- Leonard Carey as Hilton - Alan's Assistant
- C. Montague Shaw as Registrar
- Lawrence Grant as Judge
- Guy Bellis as Attorney in Court

== Radio adaptation ==
The Unguarded Hour was presented on Theatre Guild on the Air December 28, 1952. The one-hour adaptation starred Michael Redgrave and Nina Foch.

== Bibliography ==
- Kabatchnik, Amnon. Blood on the Stage, 1925-1950: Milestone Plays of Crime, Mystery and Detection. Scarecrow Press, 2010.
