= Peril at End House (disambiguation) =

Peril at End House may refer to:

- Peril at End House, Agatha Christie novel
- Peril at End House (play), Arnold Ridley play
- Peril at End House (video game)
