= The Maid of Scio: A Tale of Modern Greece =

1829 poem

The Maid of Scio: A Tale of Modern Greece is a poem written by Eleanor Snowden based on the Chios Massacre, which Snowden portrays in a tale of heroes, love and hate. It is a variation of the epic form. The poem was published in 1829 subsequent to Eugène Delacroix's artwork The Massacre at Chios which was completed in 1824, the same year of Lord Byron's death at Missolonghi during the Greek War of Independence. Snowden wrote six cantos and a short collection of notes at the end of the work. The poem received some critical reception from British periodicals and sold for 19s 4h from publishers. Although one publication described Snowden as having had "Byron too much before her in the composition of her poem", the general response was positive with a literature section in another English literary periodical describing her work as having 'evinced much poetic feeling'. The work and many others were unearthed in 1970 from the Corvey Castle Collection, the set of works is now named the Corvey Collection.

== History ==
The poem is one of many pieces of literature from the period that is inspired by the tragic events in the Greek isle of Chios. It is produced amidst 'enormous concentration in both Europe and America on the tragedies of the Greek Revolution and the fate of the victim(s)'; American poets Raizis and Papas suggested that 'the massacre of Scio excited the imagination of the American poets more than any other event of the Greek war'. In the preface to the text Snowden writes that "The incidents upon which this Poem is founded are presumed to have taken place at the period when the Sciotes first armed against the Turks".

There are no records of Snowden's life or death other than the critical reception surrounding her literature, which were published in various British periodicals between 1830 and 1831. Snowden is described as a "very young girl" during the time of her first publication and the decision of publishing so early is questioned by the same literature periodical; therefore only a very rough estimate of Snowden's age is possible. Snowden is only known to have had one more text published, The Moorish queen; A record of Pompeii, and other poems which contains 8 cantos and 24 short poems.

== Synopsis ==
=== Overview ===
The poem, told in sixteen cantos, begins by describing the isle of Chios and its inhabitants' idyllic existence. The natural beauty of the island is a prominent aspect; the chief Almanzor's beautiful daughter Corai is described as the Maid of Scio. Corai is to marry Constantine, a military general and a good friend of Almanzor. On the night of their marriage the Turkish army attacks the island and Almanzor is captured until Corai manages to help him escape from the prison. Upon the subsequent capture of Almanzor and Corai Almanzor is executed whilst Corai is taken to the Pacha's harem. During her time in the tower she is reinvigorated from her despair by a lute-playing Grecian slave Isidore, who subsequently assists her in escaping the harem. Upon escaping, Corai sees Constantine die in battle and is ultimately overcome with grief; in an act of defiance against the Turkish soldiers she commits suicide by jumping off the nearest cliff, declaring that the enemy will never have her freedom.

=== Canto I ===
The canto begins by describing the natural beauty of the island but soon goes on to reference the invasion of Greece by the Ottoman Empire and the ensuing destruction. The glory and the heroics in the stories of Ancient Greece and Greek mythology are referenced and anger towards the enemy is portrayed with a fervour towards the "fall of Turkish tyranny" and the overthrowing of "Moslem power". The aspirations of freedom by patriotic Greeks are a common theme throughout this introductory canto, describing the aspiration to "proudly again bail the Grecian name". After more description of Scio's beauty the first of the poem's songs is announced; it is numbered in two stanzas. The beauty of Scio [sic] is compared with the "webs of Persia's loom" in reference to the impending invasion by the Turkish army. The first monologue in the poem ensues, Corai is overcome with passion announces her desire for the freedom of the "sons of Scio" and for the Turkish to be overthrown. The concept of freedom for Greece and Scio is a heavily laden concept across the first canto. The canto ends with a serenade addressed to Corai as she sleeps, which is described as an "Elysian rest".

=== Canto II ===
The theme of filial love is introduced in this canto and Corai's ties to filial love are described as being "enshrin'd" within an "ethereal mind". The "venerable chief" Almanzor embraces Corai and admires her beauty, declaring her "The Maid of Scio-Scio's pride". Corai is the only person who can "tame his martial mood". The isle of Scio is portrayed as "far from the world, tumult free" and as a "undisturbed security" with its ties to nature continuously reiterated. The tendency of Turkish soldiers to be slaves is described here but this is also consistently referred to throughout the poem. The marriage of Corai and Constantine is announced by Almanzor, who refers to the marriage as a unity of his "friend and child". Constantine is then described for the first time in the poem; he is compared to the Greek god Apollo and the hero Hercules, his patriotism is compared with the Spartans and he is described as "superior to all". Described as a Suliote devoted "firmly to the cause of Greece, her freedom, faith and laws", Constantine is the embodiment of all that is admirable in Greek culture and mythology; the description ends with a portrayal of Constantine's fearlessness, "The birth-place of his love to save-or there to find a glorious grave!". As Corai and Constantine must part in the evening, Constantine begins to sing for Corai on his lyre. The title of this song is "Air" and compares Corai to nature's beauty; although it is realistic when it is recognised that "fate may sever my heart's dearest treasure from me!". Almanzor and Constantine are to be found with their soldiers and Almanzor begins his monologue in which loyalty and patriotism are commended and a hate for the enemy is described. The monologue ends with "Abjure the sultan tyrant's thrall, Swear by the Cross!-with heart and hand T'avert the ruin of your land!". The Suliotes swear allegiance to Constantine and prepare for the imminent battle.

=== Canto III ===
Canto III begins with a strong admiration for nature and the ability of a beautiful morning in Greece to overpower the despair that is to be expected of the inhabitants of Scio. The description of beauty is interrupted by the presence of 'The Crescent' which symbolises the Ottoman Empire, and the presence of the "turban'd slaves of tyranny" who are described as coming from a "vile, despotic realm". The Turkish land on the island and enter a cavern; they search for the enemy yet are unsuccessful. The inhabitants of the isle are unaware of the current invasion and the wedding ceremony of Corai and Constantine is to take place. The beauty of Corai adorned with jewels and the beauty of the surrounding nature are described in detail; this is followed by the recognition of the enemies' intentions: "Pity! such pure delights of life should be disturb'd by foreign strife". The destruction of tranquillity and a 'terrestrial paradise' are key themes in this canto. Corai and Constantine complete the marriage ritual, just as they finish a choir begins. The subsequent Epithalamium is four stanzas in length and is dedicated to the beauty of Corai and the strength of the love between her and the warrior Constantine. The newly wedded couple reach "Almanzor's sylvan home" in which a feast is prepared and the produce of the isle of Scio is described in a lavish fashion. The "Pyrrhic dance of war" ensues with ten Suliote soldiers who conclude the ritual by laying down their arms and shouting "for Liberty and Greece". The evening does not end in happiness for Corai, who discovers her father Almanzor is missing; despite "every rock and hill around" being guarded by a "Suliote Band". Corai cries in anguish and deeply desires her father's return. The canto ends with the emphatic rhyming couplet "The bridegroom may be in the fight-For he must quit his bride this night".

=== Canto IV ===
The moon's "refulgent beams" are shining down on the isle of Scio as the Suliote warriors march; they often pause to rouse sleeping inhabitants and urge them to seek safety. All males from all roles in life depart from their loved ones in order to "gain their freedom or expire". Despite "the voice of woe on ev'ry side" there are "valor's shouts of pride", mother's bid their sons to "yield to none" in contrast to their thinly veiled despair. Nature is described as responding to the impending battle with disdain as the troops advance to somewhere they can "slake their thirst". From the surrounding trees and shrubs the soldiers manage to create shelter and a place to rest; soon they are dreaming of the "heroes of ancient Greece" with reference to Leonidas and the battle of Thermopylae. An apparition of Leonidas delivers an inspiring monologue to the soldiers that reminds them of the glorious warriors of ancient Greece. The collective dream fades away and the soldiers wonder if the apparition was real or whether it was a "phantom of the heated brain". At dawn the soldiers rise and pray for the power of the enemy to decline; the sun shines as they march towards Scio's capital.

=== Canto V ===
This canto begins by describing the pain felt by the "captive patriots" and how the retraction of their liberty is the worst pain that can be felt; this pain is then described as Almanzor's as he dwells in his dungeon as a captive of the Turkish army. Almanzor laments upon his "dreadful fate" and the beauty of the isle that is no longer his; yet most of all he is angry that "the Crescent [is] where the Cross should be". A short monologue by Almanzor ensues in which glory and honour are key themes alongside his disgust at fellow Greeks "kneeling to a Moslem lord". Almanzor resolves to die and accept a horrible fate rather than accept the bribes of the Ottoman Empire and ultimately betray his country. The Turkish soldiers approach his dungeon with their "scimitars unsheath'd"; their position as slaves is consistently reiterated throughout this canto. Almanzor is dragged to the "Pacha" yet he shows no fear as "when hath fear been known to dwell within the perfect patriot's heart?". Almanzor stands before the Pacha who enters a monologue that describes the Turkish as the "prophet's favor'd race" and then proceeds to lay out the terms of Almanzor's imprisonment. Almanzor is offered "bright heaps of gems and gold" alongside immense power on the condition that he "renounce[s] thy county and thy creed" and that he "bow[s] to the Crescent's sacred sign". Anger consumes Almanzor and in "words of mingled scorn and hate" he declares that a free-born Greek can not be swayed by taunts and bribes. The Pacha thereby sentences him to death after one night in the dungeon. Almanzor is then resting peacefully in his cell, his peace the result of "religion's pow'r' which can 'brighten e'en the darkest hour"; yet footsteps that do not resemble a soldier's weight are heard by Almanzor. The footsteps turn out to be Corai's, who intends to rescue him. After much deliberation upon who should attempt escape they run out of time and the Pacha and his guards surround the father and his hapless child; upon tearing her away from her father the Pacha declares Corai a "flow'r" that is "fit for a Moslem's paradise" and she is sent away to his harem. Within the lavishly decorated harem there are dancers that attempt to ease Corai from her despair, but to no avail. Finding their efforts in vain, a young Greek slave named Isidore is introduced. Using his lute he performs a song for Corai that is appropriate to her situation as a captive who seeks her loved ones; this rouses Corai from her state of despair and she avidly listens to Isidore's song. Once midnight passes Isidore approaches Corai and tells her to follow him if she wishes to be free; as they escape she witnesses her father's headless corpse in the courtyard which causes her to faint.

=== Canto VI ===
Upon reviving from her "deathlike swoon" Corai seeks her father. The young Isidore tenderly washes her face and reassures her. The laurel wreaths above Corai's head remind her of her marriage to Constatine, which returns some colour to her cheeks. Isidore bids Corai to escape "beyond the reach of Osmyn's pow'r" and offers to be her guardian; yet Corai declines and urges him to return home. Isidore responds by announcing he has no home; all his family are dead spare his sister of whose whereabouts he is not aware. Corai responds by declaring she knows his sister Zoe well, and she is alive. The story of Isidore's life is familiar to Corai as she has heard the tale from Zoe, with "sympathizing tears". Following this conversation Corai and Isidore rest with the branches around them offering safety as they sleep. Upon awakening in the morning Corai looks upon the plain in which she sees the Turkish banners unfurled, and soon she spots the Greek banners approaching alongside the sounds of Turkish trumpets. The final battle has begun, with Constantine in the midst of the fight. Corai attempts to run to Constantine but is restrained by Isidore. The battle is over and Constantine lays dying on the battlefield. Corai manages to escape from Isidore and "unheeding the surrounding foes" she holds her hero's corpse; despite the Turkish soldiers' attempts to remove her she clings to the body. Suddenly after finding her struggles in vain she springs up a steep nearby cliff, pausing at the "dizzy edge". Corai begins her final speech with "Learn, ye base slaves to know the Greeks!" and declares that the Harem's walls "shall ne'er boast of Corai". The pursuing soldiers are shocked by her courage and delay from capturing her. In this time Corai manages to reach the highest point of the cliff and "plunges from the precipice into the ocean's dread abyss". Beneath Corai's favourite cypress tree her urn is placed, where Zoe is often found weeping and Isidore playing his lute. The poem ends with a tribute to Constantine and Corai, "the youthful pair, who gave their lives for liberty and glory- The lovely and the brave!".

=== Notes ===
The notes section contains eleven notes that mainly exist to enhance the understanding of the text by explaining references to Greek culture, such as the explanation of "rich jewels clasp her silken zone" being that it is custom among the Greeks to richly adorn their brides with jewels and other ornaments. There are also notes that reference other works, such as the Hobhouse's Albania and Carne's Letters from the East. The description of Scio's "groves and flow'rs" in canto III is attributed to the Encyclopædia Britannica.

== Critical reception ==
- In The New Monthly Magazine and Literary Journal, Volume 30 Snowden's work is reviewed:

'A very sweet and pleasing little poem, printed at Dover. The theme is never-dying Greece, or rather a Tale of one of her daughters. It displays considerable powers of versification, great tenderness of feeling, and a rich fancy. The author, however has had Lord Byron too much before her in the composition of her poem, and it wants that novelty which alone can secure to it success in these days of superficial reading. The following is a specimen of a "Serenade" from this unpretending little production.' The review goes on to feature the 'Serenade' contained within The Maid of Scio.

- In The Metropolitan: Volume 1 a short section describes Snowden's work:

'Miss Snowden is no stranger to the public: her Maid of Scio has already appeared in print, and evinced much poetic feeling.'

- In La Bellee assemblée: or, Bell's court and fashionable magazine It is written:

'Printed, apparently, for private circulation, merely, "The Maid of Scio, a Tale of Modern Greece, in Six Cantos, by Eleanor Snowden," has reached us. Scarcely amenable to the laws of criticism, we feel ourselves called upon only to announce the appearance of this poem as a very ladylike performance, very prettily printed on gilt edged paper.'

- The Monthly repository of Theology and General Literature also reviews Snowden's work:

'The reader of this little poem is favourably prepossessed at the outset. It has no preface; and considering that the writer is a lady, and as we understand, a very young lady, the absence of all depreciation of criticism, all apology for publication, is an augury of a very creditable independence of spirit, and clear understanding of the relation between authors and the public. Whether the decisive act of publishing so early testifies an equally correct judgement of the interests of the writer, may be doubted. A poem in six cantos furnishes no easy ordeal of poetical talent; and however great may be the promise of this talent, the mere mechanical arrangement of a work of such length requires more experience than can possibly have been attained without considerable practice. There is a degree of elegance in some passages of this poem, and a liveliness of fancy in others, which lead us to hope much from the writer's future efforts, if well and energetically directed. Let the reader judge if our hopes are well founded.'

- A later version of The Monthly Repository and Review of Theology and General Literature also reviews Snowden's work:

'The descriptive beauties of Miss Snowden's poems afford assurance that she has that within which will in time prompt greater things than she has yet achieved- to a fuller and freer expression of feeling and discrimination of sentiment. Her poetry at present consists of description and narrative. When she shall have learned to impart to it the deeper and richer charm which we are sure she has to bestow she will be disposed to confine her efforts within narrower limits and to make the beauties of her verse relieve each other by a greater force both of contrast and concentration. We extract the descriptive opening of the principal poem of the volume and a passage which we are sorry to perceive is the only one of Its kind'.
