= Nick Buckley (disambiguation) =

Nick Buckley may refer to:

- Nick Buckley, a Manchester charity worker
- Nick Buckley, character in Tumbleweed (1953 film)
- Nick Buckley, character in the Agatha Christie novel Peril at End House
  - The same character in the adaptation Peril at End House (play)

== See also ==
- Nicky Buckley
