= Footsteps in the Dark (film) =

1941 film by Lloyd Bacon

- Theatrical release poster
- Directed by: Lloyd Bacon
- Written by: Lester Cole; John Wexley
- Based on: Footsteps in the Dark 1935 play by Ladislas Fodor; Blondie White 1937 play by Bernard Merivale Jeffrey Dell
- Produced by: Hal B. Wallis; Robert Lord
- Starring: Errol Flynn; Brenda Marshall; Ralph Bellamy; Alan Hale
- Cinematography: Ernest Haller
- Edited by: Owen Marks
- Music by: Friedrich Hollaender
- Production company: Warner Bros. Pictures
- Distributed by: Warner Bros. Pictures
- Release date: March 8, 1941
- Running time: 96 minutes
- Country: United States
- Language: English

Footsteps in the Dark is a 1941 American comedy mystery film directed by Lloyd Bacon and starring Errol Flynn, Brenda Marshall, and Ralph Bellamy. It was produced and distributed by Warner Bros. Pictures. Flynn plays a novelist and amateur detective investigating a murder. It takes its title from the 1935 play Footsteps in the Dark by Ladislas Fodor and also used material from the 1937 play Blondie White by Jeffrey Dell.

== Plot ==
Francis Warren appears to have a normal life handling investments, but secretly he writes lurid detective novels under the pseudonym F. X. Pettijohn. His other career is unknown to wife Rita or to anyone but Inspector Mason, who mocks the books, insisting that true crime is much more difficult to solve.

Francis's latest book is controversial, parodying members of the Thursday Club, using names that thinly disguise real members, which include his wife and her mother. Worse, "F. X. Pettijohn" sent copies of his book to every woman in the club. Indignant, Rita and her mother tell Francis that the club has decided to sue for libel. Privately, Francis advises lawyer Wellington Carruthers that the lawsuit would bring more publicity for the book, urging him to lie to the women and keep postponing any action. Carruthers deplores deceit, but Francis points out that Carruthers has been married four times to his one. Francis counsels that a happy marriage depends on being considerate, keeping things from one's wife that would make her unhappy.

A man named Leopold Fissue attempts to blackmail Francis to help him turn uncut diamonds into cash; otherwise, he will reveal Warren's secret life to the public. When Fissue is found dead on a yacht, the coroner and police think he died of heart failure caused by alcoholism. When Francis insists that Fissue was murdered for the diamonds without disclosing prior contact between them, Mason and Detective “Hoppy” Hopkins challenge Francis to solve the “murder” before the police.

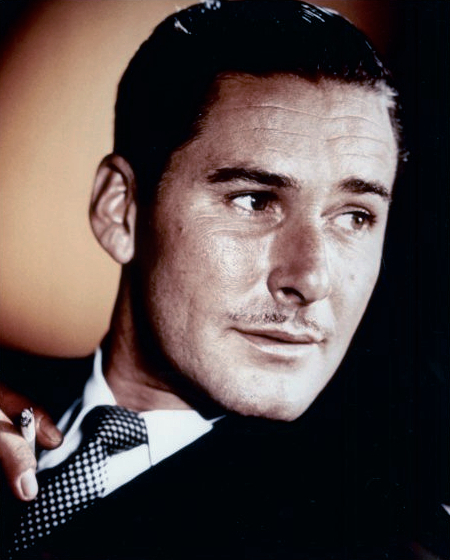
Errol Flynn plays financier/author/amateur sleuth Francis Warren, a.k.a. T. X. Pettijohn.

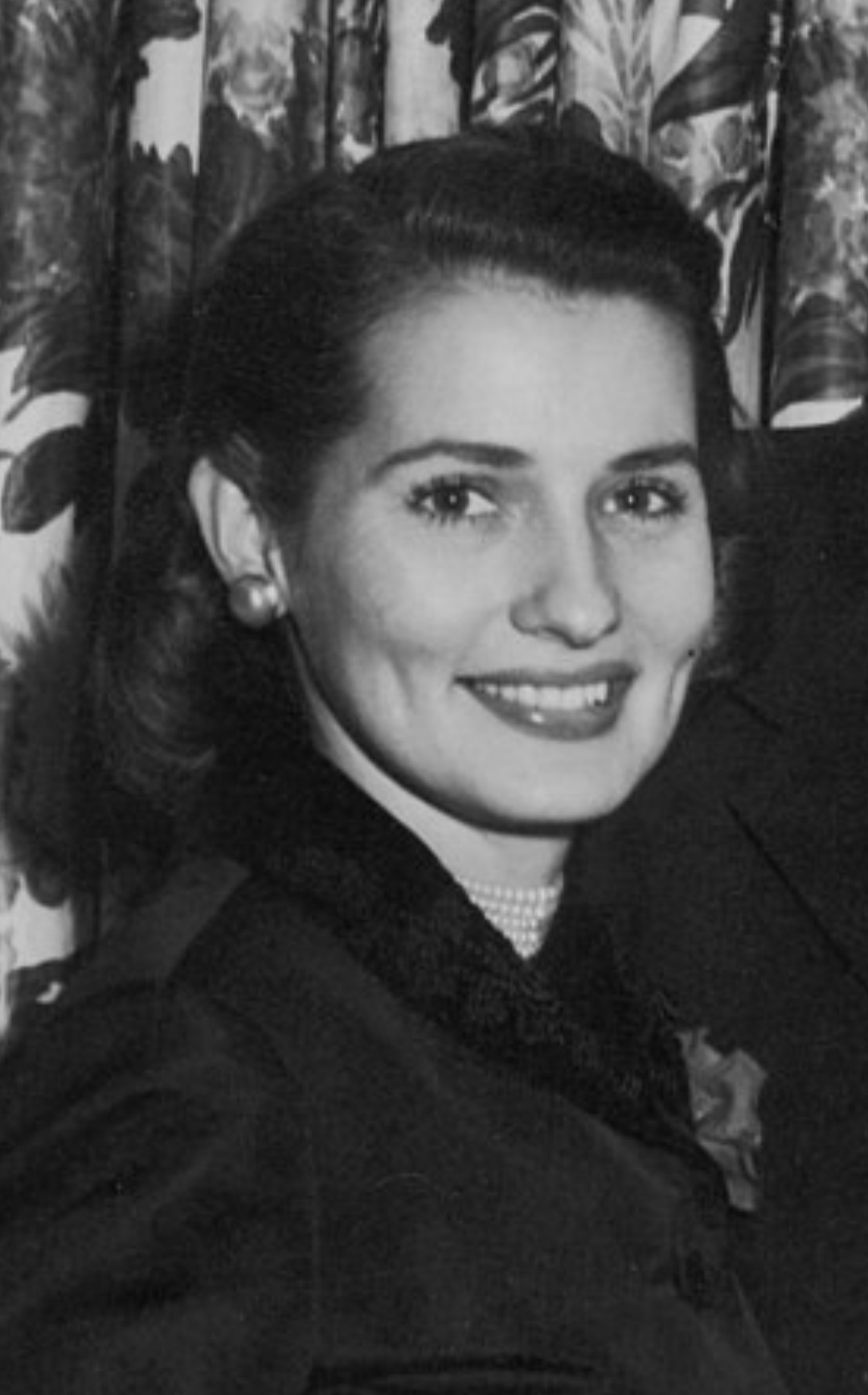
Brenda Marshall plays Rita Warren, unaware of her husband's double life.

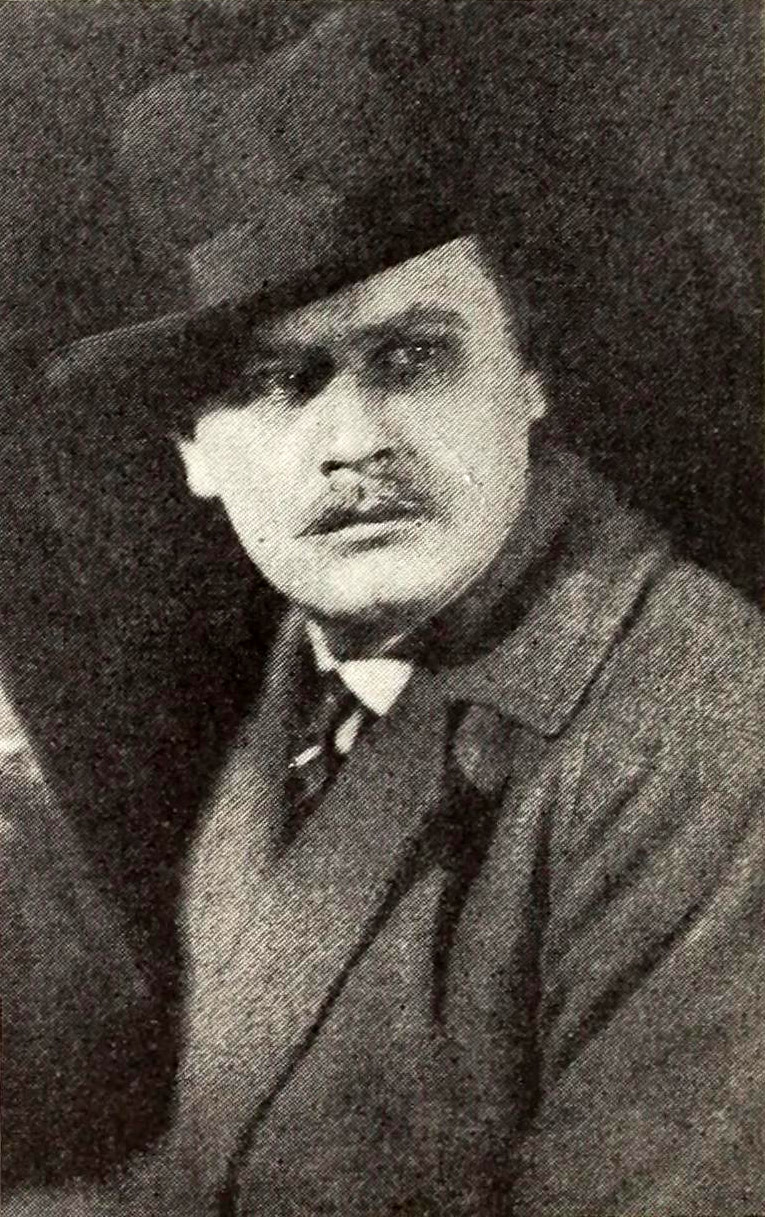
Alan Hale plays Inspector Mason, who insists that true crime is much more difficult to solve than detective fiction.

Ticket stubs in Fissue's jacket pocket lead Francis to burlesque dancer Blondie White, who becomes his prime suspect. Under an assumed identity as "Tex", Francis romances Blondie for information. Blondie's dentist, Dr. Davis, however, gives her a solid alibi. When Rita catches Francis sneaking home at 2:30 from a "business meeting", she becomes sure that Francis is having an affair and hires a private detective. The detective finds out that Francis has been seeing Blondie and reveals that Francis has a secret (writing) studio that they believe is for liaisons. Rita goes to see Blondie at her burlesque show.

Meanwhile, Blondie asks "Tex" to retrieve a suitcase from a locker. After Inspector Mason receives a call from the Federal Bureau of Investigation, informing him that Fissue was involved with a diamond smuggling ring, Mason orders another autopsy on the body, but the coroner informs him that it has been cremated. Mason and Hoppy begin to suspect that Francis murdered Fissue for the diamonds.

Francis locates the locker and finds diamonds in the suitcase. When Blondie fails to turn up at a rendezvous with "Tex" or at a rehearsal, Francis, Mason, and Hoppy converge on Blondie's apartment and find her fatally shot. Meanwhile, Davis arrives, claiming he was working in his office in the building but did not hear any gunshots. A creditor who was surveying Blondie's apartment saw a woman who lost a heel from her shoe leaving Blondie's apartment, and a taxi driver says he dropped the woman off on Lake Drive, where Francis lives. At home, Francis finds Rita's shoe is missing a heel, and Rita admits to finding Blondie's body before leaving immediately. Initially, Rita thinks Francis killed Blondie, while Francis believes Rita killed her. Hoppy arrives with the taxi driver and reveals that Francis is F. X. Pettijohn. Rita and her mother are certain that they will be stricken from the social register.

Hoppy accuses Francis and his wife of killing Blondie and Fissue for the diamonds, but Francis evades arrest and sets off to find the real killer. Francis concludes that Davis, the dentist, is Blondie's accomplice, who provided the poison to kill Fissue while Blondie got Fissue drunk so alcohol would make the poison hard to detect in an autopsy. Davis attempts to kill Francis, but Mason and Hoppy arrive and arrest Francis despite his protests. Taking his opportunity, Davis absconds in his car, but then hears on the radio that Francis fell off a roof to his death while escaping from custody. Thinking himself safe, Davis returns to his office, where Francis, Mason, and Hoppy await to apprehend him.

Mason calls Francis to help out on a new murder case, and Rita insists on joining him, without her mother's knowledge.

== Cast ==
- Errol Flynn as Francis Monroe Warren II
- Brenda Marshall as Rita Warren
- Ralph Bellamy as Dr. R. L. Davis
- Alan Hale as Police Inspector Charles M. Mason
- Lee Patrick as Blondie White
- Allen Jenkins as Mr. Wilfred
- Lucile Watson as Mrs. Agatha Archer
- William Frawley as Detective 'Hoppy' Hopkins
- Roscoe Karns as Monahan
- Grant Mitchell as Wellington Carruthers
- Maris Wrixon as June Brewster
- Noel Madison as Leopold Fissue
- Jack La Rue as Ace Vernon
- Turhan Bey as Ahmed
- Robert Homans as Police Captain (uncredited)
- Olaf Hytten as Horace (uncredited)
- Frank Mayo as Joe (uncredited)
- Jack Mower as Police Sgt. Brent (uncredited)

== Production ==
=== Original plays ===
The material was taken from two plays, Footsteps in the Dark (1935) and Blondie White (1937), both adapted from plays by Ladislas Fodor, the latter from Katzenzungen (1934).

Warner Bros. Pictures bought the rights to Footsteps in the Dark in 1937.

Blondie White was about the adventures of Frank Warren, a writer of detective novels who gets involved in a real-life murder, along with his wife. It made its debut in London in 1937 starring Basil Sydney and Joan Marion. The Scotsman called it "a dexterous and ingenuously contrived little piece". Warner Bros bought the film rights in October, with a view to possibly filming it at their British base at Teddington Studios. (On the same trip, Jack L. Warner also bought the rights to The Amazing Dr Clitterhouse and George and Margaret.)

=== Development ===
In December 1937, Warner Bros. announced it would make Blondie White as Footsteps in the Dark. Frank Cavett was assigned to write the script and Joan Blondell and Claude Rains were mentioned as possible stars. John Huston and John Wexley were then reported as working on the script.

In late 1938, Edward G. Robinson was announced as star and Anatole Litvak as director. Lya Lys was to be the female star, and in May 1939, the studio announced the film would still go ahead. It did not happen, though, and by November, Norman Reilly Raine was still working on the script.

In July 1940, Lester Cole had taken over as writer and Robinson had to drop out due to a commitment to make The Sea Wolf. Cole says he was hired to rewrite Wexley's script, calling Wexley "a fine playwright and screenwriter", but the story "was hardly his style".

Errol Flynn had just done seven period films in a row and was pestering Warner Bros. for a change of pace, so he was cast instead of Robinson. Once Flynn came on board, Olivia de Havilland was announced as his costar. She was replaced by Brenda Marshall. William Keighley was the original director announced. Louella Parsons wrote that the film would be "a humorously treated mystery yarn of The Thin Man variety".

=== Shooting ===
Filming started in October 1940.

Ralph Bellamy said Flynn was "a darling. Couldn't or wouldn't take himself seriously. And he drank like there was no tomorrow. Had a bum ticker from the malaria he'd picked up in Australia. Also a spot of TB. Tried to enlist but flunked his medical, so he drank some more. Knew he wouldn't live into old age. He really had a ball in Footsteps in the Dark. He was so glad to be out of swashbucklers."

== Reception ==
=== Box office ===
The film was one of Flynn's less successful movies at the box office around this time.

=== Critical ===
Bosley Crowther of The New York Times wrote: "A few spots are faintly amusing, thanks to Allen Jenkins as a chauffeur-valet and William Frawley as a thick-headed cop. But most of it is painfully dull and obvious, the pace is incredibly slow and Mr. Flynn, playing the detective, acts like a puzzled schoolboy."

Variety wrote that Flynn did "well enough" but called the script "routine, going in for too much dialog and too many absurdities." Los Angeles Times wrote that "Errol Flynn becomes a modern for a change in a whodunit film and the excursion proves eminently worth-while... an exceptionally clever and amusing exhibit – a little lagging now and then in the action but nothing to bother about in that regard".

Film Daily reported: "Basis for a first-rate mystery meller with plenty of laughs is contained in the plot for this yarn, but the development of the script falls short of the story possibilities. The screenplay lacks any real punch drama and it does not have any hilariously amusing comedy, and it is also slightly incredible at times. On the whole, this picture is moderately entertaining screenfare for the average audience."

Harrison's Reports called the film "fairly good", though the killer's identity was "pretty obvious".

The Wall Street Journal called it "an amusing if not too subtle mystery".

John Mosher of The New Yorker wrote that while the burlesque performer added a "bright note", the film was otherwise a "commonplace mystery picture".

Filmink magazine argued Flynn was "not entirely comfortable as a comic actor but it's a very endearing performance, and he has that charisma and charm to compensate for his lack of technique. Unfortunately, the film doesn't do its star justice."

=== Proposed sequel ===
John Wexley and Lester Cole were reported as working on a sequel, Ghosts Don't Leave Footprints. This was to reteam Marshall and Flynn and revolve around spiritualists. However no sequel materialized.

=== Other versions ===
The BBC made a TV adaptation of Blondie White called The Strange Case of Blondie White in 1947.

== Bibliography ==
- Goble, Alan. The Complete Index to Literary Sources in Film. Walter de Gruyter, 1999.
- Kabatchnik, Amnon. Blood on the Stage, 1925-1950: Milestone Plays of Crime, Mystery, and Detection : an Annotated Repertoire. Scarecrow Press, 2010.
