= Arnold Ridley =

English playwright and actor (1896–1984)

Arnold Ridley OBE
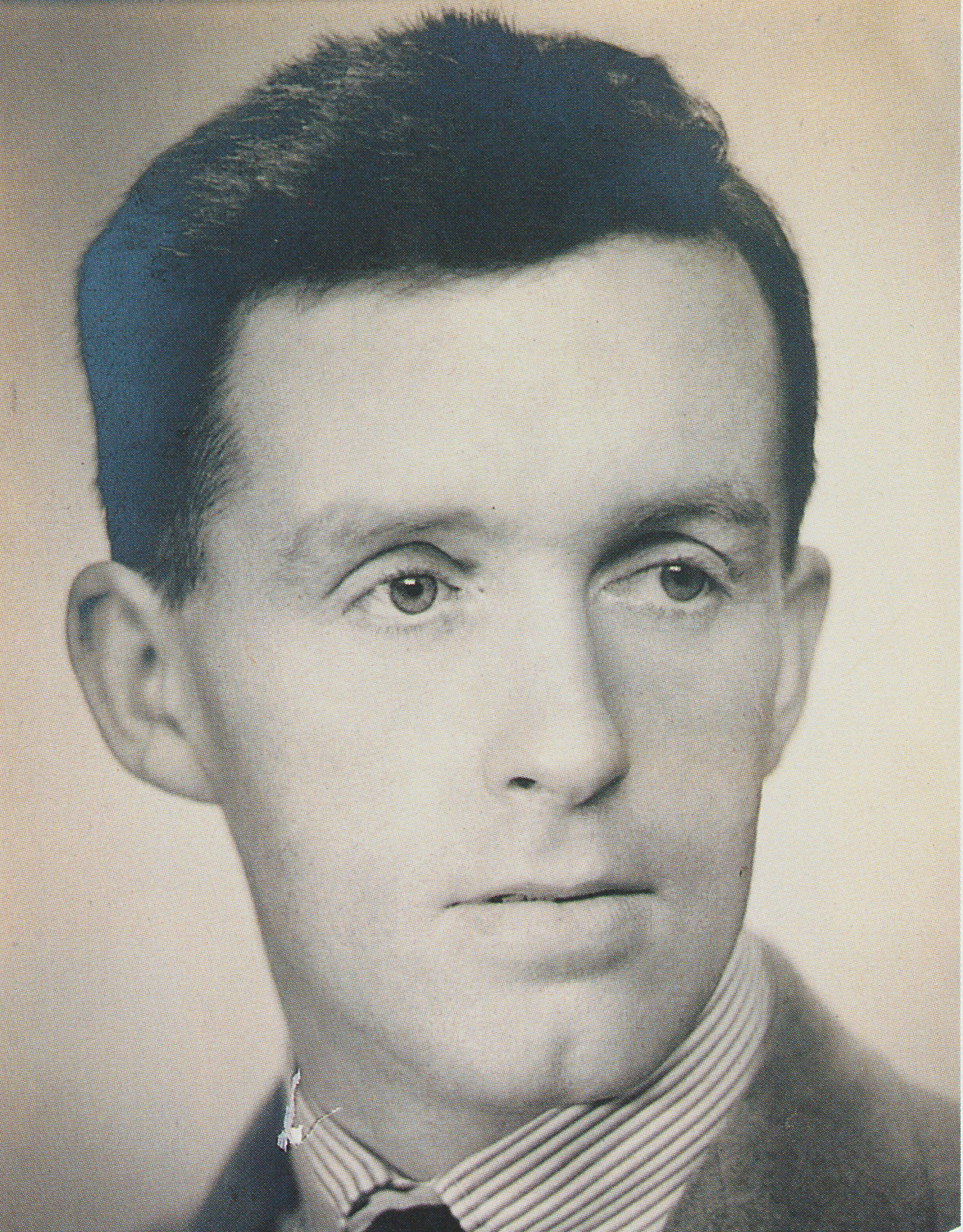
- Ridley in 1921
- Born: William Arnold Ridley; 7 January 1896; Walcot, Bath, Somerset, England
- Died: 12 March 1984 (aged 88); Northwood, London Borough of Hillingdon, England
- Resting place: Bath Abbey Cemetery, Widcombe, Somerset, England
- Education: University of Bristol
- Occupations: Actor, playwright
- Years active: 1918–1984
- Spouses: Hilda Kathleen Mary Cooke (m. 1926–1939); Isola Strong (m. 1939); Althea Parker (m. 1945)
- Children: 1
- Relatives: Daisy Ridley (great-niece)
- Military career
- Allegiance: United Kingdom
- Branch: British Army
- Service years: 1915–1917; 1939–1940; 1940–1944
- Rank: Captain
- Service number: 103363
- Units: Somerset Light Infantry; Caterham Home Guard
- Conflicts: First World War: Battle of the Somme; Second World War: Battle of France

William Arnold Ridley (7 January 1896 – 12 March 1984) was an English playwright and actor, known early in his career for writing the 1925 play The Ghost Train and later in life for the British television sitcom Dad's Army (1968–1977), in which he played the elderly, bumbling Private Godfrey. He also appeared in such Dad's Army spin-offs as the feature film version and the stage production.

== Early life ==
William Arnold Ridley was born in Walcot, Bath, Somerset, England, the son of Rosa Caroline (née Morrish, 1870–1956) and William Robert Ridley (1871–1931). His father was a gymnastics instructor and ran a boot and shoe shop. He attended the Clarendon School and the Bath City Secondary School where he was a keen sportsman. A graduate of the University of Bristol, he studied in their Education Department, and played Hamlet in a student production. Ridley undertook teaching practice at an Elementary School in Bristol.

== Military service ==
Ridley was a student teacher and had made his theatrical debut in Prunella at the Theatre Royal, Bristol when he volunteered for service with the British Army on the outbreak of the First World War in August 1914. He was initially rejected because of a hammer toe. In December 1915, he enlisted as a private with the Somerset Light Infantry, British Army. He saw active service in the war, sustaining several wounds in close-quarter battle. His left hand was left virtually useless by wounds sustained on the Somme; his legs were riddled with shrapnel; he received a bayonet wound in the groin; and the lasting impacts of a blow to the head from a German soldier's rifle butt left him prone to blackouts after the war. He was medically discharged from the army with the rank of lance corporal in May 1917. He received the Silver War Badge having been honourably discharged from the army due to wounds received in the war, and was awarded the British War Medal and the Victory Medal for his service.

Ridley rejoined the army in 1939 following the outbreak of the Second World War. He was commissioned into the General List on 7 October 1939 as a second lieutenant. He served with the British Expeditionary Force in France during the "Phoney War", employed as a "Conducting Officer" tasked with supervising journalists who were visiting the front line. In May 1940, Ridley returned to Britain on the overcrowded destroyer HMS Vimiera, which was the last British ship to escape from the harbour during the Battle of Boulogne. Shortly afterwards, he was discharged from the Armed Forces on health grounds. He relinquished his commission as a captain on 1 June 1940. He subsequently joined the Home Guard, in his home town of Caterham, and ENSA, with which he toured the country. He described his wartime experiences on Desert Island Discs in 1973.

== Acting career ==
After his medical discharge from the army, Ridley commenced a career as a professional actor. In 1918 he joined the company of the Birmingham Repertory Theatre, staying for two years and playing 40 parts before moving on to Plymouth, where he took a break from the stage when his war injuries began to trouble him.

After being stranded for an evening at Mangotsfield railway station, near Bristol, Ridley was inspired to write the play The Ghost Train (1925), a tale of passengers stranded at a haunted railway station in Cornwall, with one of the characters being an incognito British Government agent trying to catch Bolshevik revolutionaries active in Great Britain. The play became a hit, with 665 consecutive performances in London's West End, and numerous revivals. The first credited film version was a German-British silent film, The Ghost Train, in 1927. The Ghost Train was also filmed in 1931, with Jack Hulbert, and again in 1941, when it starred Arthur Askey. A novelisation of The Ghost Train was published by The Readers Library Publishing Company in 1927. Ridley also wrote more than 30 other plays, including The Wrecker (1924), Keepers of Youth (1929), The Flying Fool (1929) and Recipe for Murder (1932).

During his time in military service in the Second World War he adapted the Agatha Christie novel Peril at End House into a West End play that premiered in 1940. Ridley's post-war play, Beggar My Neighbour, was first performed in 1951 and adapted for the Ealing Comedy film Meet Mr. Lucifer (1953).

Ridley worked regularly as an actor, including an appearance in the British comedy Crooks in Cloisters (1964). He also played Doughy Hood, the village baker, in the radio soap opera The Archers and the Rev. Guy Atkins in the ATV soap Crossroads from the programme's inception in 1964 until 1968. He became a household name after he was cast as Private Godfrey, the gentle platoon medic in the television comedy series Dad's Army (1968–1977). He continued to appear into his eighties, and was appointed an OBE in the 1982 Queen's New Year Honours List, for services to the theatre.

He was the subject of This Is Your Life in 1976 when he was surprised by Eamonn Andrews at London's Marylebone Station.

== Personal life ==
Ridley was married three times. His first marriage lasted from January 1926 to 1939, and was followed by a short marriage to Isola Strong, an actress (It's Hard to Be Good), at Kensington in 1939, before his final marriage to actress Althea Parker (1911–2001) on 3 October 1945; they had one son, Nicolas (b. 1947). He was a Freemason, and belonged to the Savage Club Lodge in London. The actress Daisy Ridley is his great-niece.

A keen rugby player in his youth, he was President of Bath Rugby from 1950 to 1952.

== Death ==
Ridley died in hospital in Northwood in 1984 at the age of 88 after falling at his residence in Denville Hall, a home for retired actors. His body was cremated at the Golders Green Crematorium and an urn holding his ashes was buried in his parents' grave at Bath Abbey Cemetery. His collection of theatrical memorabilia was left to the University of Bristol and has been made available online.

== Works ==
=== Plays ===
- The Ghost Train (1923)
- The Wrecker (with Bernard Merivale, 1924)
- Old Leeds (1928)
- The Flying Fool (with Bernard Merivale, 1929)
- Keepers of Youth (1929) (filmed in 1931)
- Third Time Lucky (1932)
- Half a Crown (1934)
- Recipe for Murder (1936)
- Peril at End House (1945, from Agatha Christie novel)
- Easy Money (1948)
- East of Ludgate Hill (1950)
- Murder Happens (1951)
- The Return (1953)
- Mrs Tredruthan's Son (1953)
- Beggar My Neighbour (1953)
- Geranium (1954)
- Tabitha (1956) (written with Mary Cathcart Borer)
- You, My Guests (1956)
- Bellamy (1960)
- Hercule Poirot Strikes (1967, from Agatha Christie novel)

=== Film adaptations (original author) ===
- Ghost Train, directed by Géza von Bolváry (1927, based on the play The Ghost Train)
- The Wrecker, directed by Géza von Bolváry (1929, based on the play The Wrecker)
- The Flying Fool, directed by Walter Summers (1931, based on the play The Flying Fool)
- Third Time Lucky, directed by Walter Forde (1931, based on the play Third Time Lucky)
- The Ghost Train, directed by Walter Forde (1931, based on the play The Ghost Train)
- Keepers of Youth, directed by Thomas Bentley (1931, based on the play Keepers of Youth)
- Kísértetek vonata, directed by Lajos Lázár (Hungary, 1933, based on the play The Ghost Train)
- Trenul fantoma, directed by Jean Mihail (Romania, 1933, based on the play The Ghost Train)
- The Warren Case, directed by Walter Summers (1934, based on the play The Last Chance)
- Un train dans la nuit, directed by René Hervil (France, 1934, based on the play The Ghost Train)
- Blind Justice, directed by Bernard Vorhaus (1934, based on the play Recipe for Murder)
- Seven Sinners, directed by Albert de Courville (1936)
- East of Ludgate Hill, directed by Manning Haynes (1937, based on the play East of Ludgate Hill)
- De Spooktrein, directed by Karel Lamač (Netherlands, 1939, based on the play The Ghost Train)
- Shadowed Eyes, directed by Maclean Rogers (1940)
- The Ghost Train, directed by Walter Forde (1941, based on the play The Ghost Train)
- Easy Money, directed by Bernard Knowles (1948, based on the play Easy Money)
- Meet Mr. Lucifer, directed by Anthony Pelissier (1953, based on the play Beggar My Neighbour)
- Who Killed the Cat?, directed by Montgomery Tully (1966, based on the play Tabitha. Co-written with Mary Cathcart Borer)

=== Screenwriter ===
- The Flying Fool (dir. Walter Summers, 1931)
- Royal Eagle (dir. George A. Cooper, 1936)
- East of Ludgate Hill (dir. Manning Haynes, 1937)
- Shadowed Eyes (dir. Maclean Rogers, 1940)

== Filmography ==
=== Films ===
Year	Title	Role	Notes
1949	The Interrupted Journey	Mr Saunders	Uncredited
1951	Green Grow the Rushes	Tom Cuffley	
1952	Stolen Face	Dr Russell	
1963	Wings of Mystery	Mr Bell	Children's Film Foundation
1964	Crooks in Cloisters	Newsagent	
1966	A Man for All Seasons	Innkeeper	Uncredited
1971	Dad's Army	Private Godfrey	
1973	Carry On Girls	Alderman Pratt	
1975	The Amorous Milkman	Cinema Attendant	

=== Television ===
Year	Title	Role	Notes
1959	Charlesworth	Bank Clerk	
1964–1968	Crossroads	Rev. Guy Atkins	
1965	The Human Jungle	Mr Swinnerton	Episode: "Heartbeats in a Tin Box"
1967	The Avengers	Elderly Gentleman at lake	Episode: Never, Never Say Die
1967	Z-Cars	Gardener	Episode: I Never Meant to Drop Him: Part 1
1967	Coronation Street	Herbert Whittle	
1967	Mrs Thursday	Director	
1967	Beggar My Neighbour	Man	2 episodes
1968–1977	Dad's Army	Private Godfrey	80 episodes, (final appearance)
1968	Theatre 625	Tunicliffe	
1968	The War of Darkie Pilbeam	Hospital patient	
1968	The Very Merry Widow	Sir Frederick Snayle, QC	
1968	The Caesars	Nigrinus	
1969	The Contenders	Walrus	
1969	Out of the Unknown	Munnings	
1969	Special Branch	Mr. Turner	
1970	As Good Cooks Go	Mr. Charmers	
1970	The Doctors	Percy	
1970	W. Somerset Maugham	London Club Waiter	
1971	Crossroads	Guy Atkins	
1971	The Flaxton Boys	Mr. Mooney	
1972	The Persuaders!	Uncle Rodney	Episode: The Ozerov Inheritance
1973	Thriller	1st Old Man	
1975	Hogg's Back	Old Man	
