= The Flying Fool (play) =

- Original language: English
- Written by: Arnold Ridley; Bernard Merivale
- Genre: Thriller

Premiere
- Date: 1929

The Flying Fool is a 1929 thriller play by the British writer Arnold Ridley and Bernard Merivale. It enjoyed a successful run in the West End.

== Adaptation ==
In 1931, the play was adapted into a film of the same title directed by Walter Summers and starring Henry Kendall and Benita Hume.

== Bibliography ==
- Goble, Alan. The Complete Index to Literary Sources in Film. Walter de Gruyter, 1999.
- Kabatchnik, Amnon. Blood on the Stage, 1925-1950: Milestone Plays of Crime, Mystery, and Detection : an Annotated Repertoire. Scarecrow Press, 2010.
