= Richard Clayton (actor) =

American actor and agent (1915-2008)

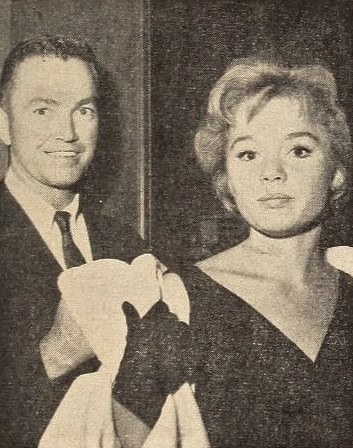
Tuesday Weld with agent Richard Clayton, 1960

Richard "Dick" Clayton (June 12, 1915 – September 29, 2008) was an American actor who became a talent agent. He represented such high-profile talent as Jane Fonda, James Dean, Tab Hunter and Burt Reynolds during his career as an agent.

== Early life ==
Clayton was born in Montclair, New Jersey. He began his career in New York City, where he worked as an actor and model.

== Film career ==
In an item reported from Hollywood, The New York Times noted that Warner Bros. had placed "Richard Clayton of the New York Stage" under contract, one of several actors engaged for its forthcoming production of what was described as The Life of Knute Rockne.

He appeared in several of the studio's films under his contract with the studio, including The Hunchback of Notre Dame in 1939, Knute Rockne, All American in 1940 and the 1941 pictures A Very Young Lady and High Sierra. Most of his roles were small and his Hollywood acting career never really took off, but he had bigger parts in some smaller productions like Miss Polly, where he had a romantic role.

Clayton served in the U.S. Navy during World War II, receiving a Purple Heart for his wounds. He met and befriended actor James Dean following his return from the war. Clayton and Dean appeared together in the 1951 film, Sailor Beware.

== Career as an agent ==
Clayton moved from full-time acting to repping when he took a position at the Famous Artists Agency. As an agent, Clayton represented his friend, James Dean, as well as Tab Hunter, Farrah Fawcett, Jane Fonda, Harrison Ford, Nick Nolte, Richard Chamberlain, Jan-Michael Vincent,Tuesday Weld, and Angie Dickinson. He continued to work as a full-time talent agent for several decades. He later became personal manager to actor Burt Reynolds. Clayton ultimately managed Reynolds' career for 22 years.

In the late 1950s, Clayton built a small house in Palm Desert, California, with close friend and client Tab Hunter. Clayton died from congestive heart failure on September 29, 2008, in Los Angeles at the age of 93.
