= Cliddesden railway station =

Former railway station in England

Cliddesden
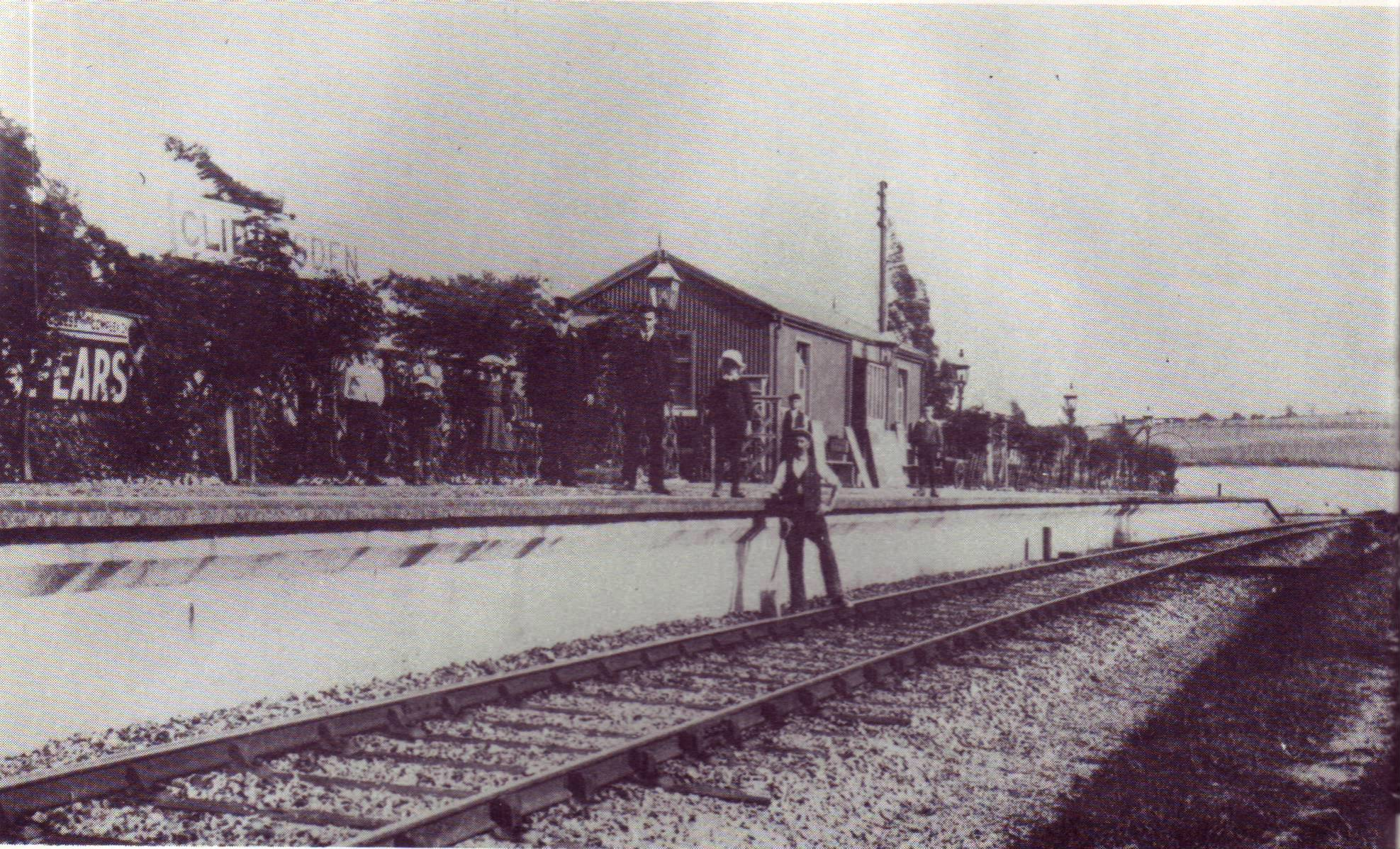

General information
- Location: Cliddesden, Basingstoke and Deane; England
- Coordinates: 51.2372°N 1.0874°W
- Grid reference: SU638490
- Platforms: 1

Other information
- Status: Disused

History
- Original company: Basingstoke and Alton Light Railway
- Pre-grouping: London and South Western Railway
- Post-grouping: Southern Railway

Key dates
- 1 June 1901: Station opened
- 1 January 1917: Closed
- 18 August 1924: Reopened
- 12 September 1932: Closed to passengers
- 1 June 1936: Closed to goods
Location

Cliddesden railway station was a railway station in the village of Cliddesden, Hampshire, England. The station was a stop on the Basingstoke and Alton Light Railway until its closure in 1932.

== History ==
When built, a wind engine was provided to supply the station buildings and cottages. It was made by John Wallis Titt. The wind engine outlasted the railway, surviving until the 1940s. The station was used for the filming of 1937 film Oh, Mr Porter! which features Cliddesden as the fictional Buggleskelly.

== Route ==
Preceding station	Disused railways	Following station
Basingstoke	Basingstoke and Alton Light Railway	Herriard

== Sources ==
- "Basingstoke Railway History in Maps". Christopher Tolley. 2001. Archived from the original on 6 December 2008.
