= Wallace Geoffrey =

British writer and actor

Wallace Geoffrey was a British writer and actor.

== Partial filmography ==
Actor

- Brown Sugar (1931)
- The House Opposite (1931)
- The Flying Fool (1931)
- Detective Lloyd, a serial
- Life Goes On (1932)
- Aren't We All? (1932)
- On Secret Service (1933)
- Boomerang (1934)
- The Outcast (1934)
- The Return of Bulldog Drummond (1934)
- Chick (1936)
- The Scarab Murder Case (1936) (lost)
- Premiere (1938)
