= The Perfect Gentleman (film) =

1935 film by Tim Whelan

- Film poster
- Directed by: Tim Whelan
- Written by: Edward Childs Carpenter; Lew Lipton
- Based on: the unproduced play, The Perfect Gentleman by Edward Childs Carpenter
- Produced by: Harry Rapf
- Starring: Frank Morgan; Cicely Courtneidge
- Cinematography: Charles G. Clarke
- Edited by: George Boemler
- Music by: William Axt
- Production company: Metro-Goldwyn-Mayer
- Distributed by: Loew's Inc.
- Release date: November 22, 1935
- Running time: 73 minutes
- Country: United States
- Language: English

The Perfect Gentleman (also known by the alternative title The Imperfect Lady) is a 1935 American comedy film directed by Tim Whelan and starring Frank Morgan, Cicely Courtneidge and Heather Angel. It was based on a play by Edward Childs Carpenter (which was based on a story by Cosmo Hamilton). The screenplay concerns the father of a British country vicar, who almost brings scandal on the family when he becomes entangled with an actress.

== Cast ==
- Frank Morgan as Major Horatio Chatteris
- Cicely Courtneidge as April Maye
- Heather Angel as Evelyn Alden
- Herbert Mundin as Frederick Hitch
- Una O'Connor as Harriet Chatteris
- Richard Waring as John Chatteris
- Henry Stephenson as Bishop
- Forrester Harvey as Wally Baxton
- Mary Forbes as Lady Clyffe-Pembrook
- Doris Lloyd as Kate
- Edward Cooper as Alf
- Brenda Forbes as Penelope, the Maid
- David Clyde as Morse
- Val Stanton as Workman in pub (uncredited)
- Charles Coleman as Theatre Doorman

== Critical reception ==
Writing for The Spectator in 1936, Graham Greene gave the film a poor review, summarizing his review as "to be avoided at any cost". Noting that Cicely Courtneidge had come from a theatrical background and that her acting skills were adequate for the stage, Greene described her aspect in this film as "fling[ing] her facial contortions to the back of the gallery", and expressed sorrow that so many of the stage's most capable comedians were today "going the Pagliacci way". Greene took particular dislike of the scene where Courtneidge played the part of a young soldier.
