= Ladislas Fodor =

Hungarian playwright and screenwriter (1898–1978)

Ladislas Fodor (1898–1978) was a Hungarian novelist, playwright, and screenwriter.

== Plays ==
- A Church Mouse (A templom egére); a comedy in three acts, adapted by James L. A. Burrell (1928)
- Jewel Robbery (Ékszerrablás a Váci utcában); a comedy in three acts, adapted by Bertram Bloch (1931)
- I Love an Actress (Szeretek egy színésznőt); a comedy in four acts, adapted by Chester Erskin (1932)
- The Kiss Before the Mirror (Csók a tükör előtt); a drama in three acts (1932)
- Youth at the Helm (Helyet az ifjúságnak) (1933)
- Matura (Érettségi); a comedy in three acts (1934)
- A Woman Lies (Egy asszony hazudik); a drama in three acts (1935)
- The Night Before the Divorce (Die Nacht vor der Scheidung); comedy (1937)
- Strange Case of Blondie White (Katzenzungen, 1934); a play in three acts, adapted by Bernard Merivale and Jeffrey Dell (1938)
- Birthday Gift (Születésnapi ajándék); a play in three acts (1939)
- The Vigil (1947)
- Europa and the Bull (1952)

== Filmography ==
=== Films based on plays by Ladislas Fodor ===
- Poor as a Church Mouse, directed by Richard Oswald (Germany, 1931, based on the play A Church Mouse)
- Beauty and the Boss, directed by Roy Del Ruth (1932, based on the play A Church Mouse)
- Jewel Robbery, directed by William Dieterle (1932, based on the play Jewel Robbery)
- The Kiss Before the Mirror, directed by James Whale (1933, based on the play The Kiss Before the Mirror)
- La Cinquième empreinte, directed by Karl Anton (France, 1934, based on the play Lilas blanc)
- The Church Mouse, directed by Monty Banks (UK, 1934, based on the play A Church Mouse)
- Lärm um Weidemann, directed by Johann Alexander Hübler-Kahla (Germany, 1935, based on the play Youth at the Helm) (uncredited)
- The White Lilac, directed by Albert Parker (UK, 1935, based on the play Lilas blanc)
- Thunder in the Night, directed by George Archainbaud (1935, based on the play A Woman Lies)
- The Unguarded Hour, directed by Sam Wood (1936, based on the play The Unguarded Hour)
- Girls' Dormitory, directed by Irving Cummings (1936, based on the play Matura)
- Jack of All Trades, directed by Robert Stevenson and Jack Hulbert (UK, 1936, based on the play Youth at the Helm)
- Wives Under Suspicion, directed by James Whale (1938, based on the play The Kiss Before the Mirror)
- La danza dei milioni, directed by Camillo Mastrocinque (Italy, 1940, based on the play Youth at the Helm)
- Footsteps in the Dark, directed by Lloyd Bacon (1941, based on the play Strange Case of Blondie White)
- Fröken Kyrkråtta, directed by Schamyl Bauman (Sweden, 1941, based on the play A Church Mouse)
- A Very Young Lady, directed by Harold D. Schuster (1941, based on the play Matura)
- Frøken Kirkemus, directed by Lau Lauritzen Jr. and Alice O'Fredericks (Denmark, 1941, based on the play A Church Mouse)
- The Night Before the Divorce, directed by Robert Siodmak (1942, based on the play The Night Before the Divorce)
- The Peterville Diamond, directed by Walter Forde (UK, 1943, based on the play Jewel Robbery)
- Drei, von denen man spricht, directed by Axel von Ambesser (West Germany, 1953, based on the play Youth at the Helm)
- A House Full of Love, directed by Hans Schweikart (West Germany, 1954, based on the play Fräulein Fortuna)
- Love Without Illusions, directed by Erich Engel (West Germany, 1955, based on the play Ärztliches Geheimnis)
- Die Abiturientin, directed by Georg Marischka (West Germany, 1958, TV film based on the play Matura)
- North to Alaska, directed by Henry Hathaway (1960, based on the play Birthday Gift)
- Modern Cinderella, directed by Alekos Sakellarios (Greece, 1965, based on the play A Church Mouse)
- Más pobre que una laucha, directed by Julio Saraceni (Argentina, 1955, based on the play A Church Mouse)

=== Ladislas Fodor as screenwriter ===
- Le Bal (France/Germany, 1931)
- Charlie Chan in City in Darkness (1939)
- Seven Sinners (1940)
- Tales of Manhattan (1942)
- Cairo (1942)
- Isle of Missing Men (1942)
- Girl Trouble (1942)
- Tampico (1944)
- The Imperfect Lady (1947)
- The Other Love (1947)
- The Great Sinner (1949)
- The Man from Cairo (1953)
- Tom Thumb (1958)
- Menschen im Hotel (West Germany, 1959)
- Abschied von den Wolken (West Germany, 1959)
- Grounds for Divorce (West Germany, 1960)
- Das Riesenrad (West Germany, 1961)
- The Return of Doctor Mabuse (West Germany, 1961)
- The Invisible Dr. Mabuse (West Germany, 1962)
- Breakfast in Bed (West Germany, 1963)
- Scotland Yard Hunts Dr. Mabuse (West Germany, 1963)
- The Strangler of Blackmoor Castle (West Germany, 1963)
- Old Shatterhand (West Germany, 1964)
- The Secret of Dr. Mabuse (West Germany, 1964)
- The Treasure of the Aztecs (West Germany, 1965)
- The Pyramid of the Sun God (West Germany, 1965)
- Who Killed Johnny R.? (West Germany, 1966)
- Die Nibelungen (West Germany, 1966)
- The Peking Medallion (Italy/France/West Germany, 1967)
- Im Banne des Unheimlichen (West Germany, 1968)
- The Last Roman (West Germany, 1968)
- The Man with the Glass Eye (West Germany, 1969)
- Strogoff (Italy/France/West Germany, 1970)
- The Devil Came from Akasava (Spain/West Germany, 1971)
- Es muss nicht immer Kaviar sein (West Germany, 1977, TV series)
