= Elaine Ryan =

American screenwriter and playwright (1905–1981)

- Born: Josephine Elaine Ryan; October 3, 1905; San Francisco, California, US
- Died: June 7, 1981 (aged 75); San Francisco, California, US
- Education: UC Berkeley; Yale University
- Occupation: Screenwriter

Elaine Ryan (October 3, 1905 – June 7, 1981) was an American screenwriter and playwright known for writing Hollywood films in the 1930s and 1940s, as well as television in the 1950s.

== Biography ==
Elaine Ryan was born in San Francisco to Daniel Ryan, a prominent attorney, and Josephine Cooney, a teacher. She attended the University of California Berkeley and Yale University, where she was one of few female graduates of an esteemed playwriting program. She married William Wallace, a rancher, in 1931.

== Selected filmography ==
- Babes on Broadway (1941)
- A Very Young Lady (1941)
- Second Chorus (1940)
- Listen, Darling (1938)
- Mr. Dodd Takes the Air (1937)
