= Treloar's Hospital Platform railway station =

Disused railway station in England

Treloar's Hospital Platform

General information
- Location: Alton, East Hampshire; England
- Coordinates: 51.1409°N 0.9891°W
- Grid reference: SU708385
- Line: Basingstoke and Alton Light Railway
- Platforms: 1

Other information
- Status: Disused

History
- Original company: London and South Western Railway
- Pre-grouping: London and South Western Railway
- Post-grouping: Southern Railway

Key dates
- c. 1918: Station opened
- 1939: Station closed for passengers
- 1967: closed for goods
Location

Treloar's Hospital Platform (also known as Alton Park and Cripples' Home Siding) was a railway station which served Lord Mayor Treloar's hospital in Alton, Hampshire, England.

== History ==
The station was built by the London and South Western Railway no earlier than 5 April 1910 on the route of the Basingstoke and Alton Light Railway. It was opened c. 1918, and was a private station, used by parties of children visiting Lord Mayor Treloar's Cripples Home, which had opened in 1908. The station was known under three names: Cripples' Home Siding (until at least 1929); Alton Park and Treloar's Hospital Platform.

The platform was 200 feet (61 m) long and was located just 20 chains (0.25 miles, 0.40 km) from Butts Junction at which the line from Basingstoke joins the Mid-Hants Railway on the approach to Alton railway station.

The station was closed in 1939 by the Southern Railway. The platform/line was used for goods traffic until 1967.

Preceding station	Disused railways	Following station
Bentworth and Lasham; Line and station closed	London and South Western Railway; Basingstoke and Alton Light Railway	Alton; Line closed, station open
