= Nobody Ordered Wolves =

1939 novel

- 1947 edition (Guild Books)
- Author: Jeffrey Dell
- Language: English
- Genre: Comedy
- Publisher: Heinemann
- Publication date: 1939
- Publication place: United Kingdom
- Media type: Print

Nobody Ordered Wolves is a 1939 comic novel by the British writer and film director Jeffrey Dell. The book is a satire on the British film industry. It focuses on the fictional company Paradox Film Productions headed by the mogul Napoleon Bott who is modelled on the real-life Alexander Korda and his London Film Productions. The book concludes with a large number of wolves, hired by Bott for one of his epic extravaganzas, running loose through London causing havoc as a metaphor for the British film industry having "gone to the dogs".

== Bibliography ==
- Macnab, Geoffrey. J. Arthur Rank and the British Film Industry. Routledge, 1994.
- Trumpbour, John. Selling Hollywood to the World: U.S. and European Struggles for Mastery of the Global Film Industry, 1920-1950. Cambridge University Press, 2002.
