= SER F class =

Type and origin
- Power type: Steam
- Designer: James Stirling
- Build date: 1883–1898
- Total produced: 88
Specifications
- Configuration
  - Whyte: 4-4-0
  - UIC: 2′B n2
- Gauge: 4 ft 8 1/2 in (1,435 mm)
- Driver dia.: 7 ft 0 in (2.134 m)
- Loco weight: 42.5 long tons (43.2 t)
- Fuel type: Coal
- Boiler pressure: 160 lbf/in^{2} (1.10 MPa)
- Cylinders: Two,
- Cylinder size: 19 in × 26 in (483 mm × 660 mm)
- Valve gear: Stephenson
Performance figures
- Tractive effort: 15,195 lbf (67.6 kN)
Career
- Operators: South Eastern Railway; → South Eastern and Chatham Railway; → Southern Railway
- Class: F
- Number in class: 1 January 1923: 12
- Withdrawn: 1925–1930
- Disposition: All scrapped

The SER F class was a class of 4-4-0 steam locomotives of the South Eastern Railway. The class was designed by James Stirling and introduced in 1883.

== Rebuilding ==
The locomotives passed to the South Eastern and Chatham Railway in 1899 and 76 were rebuilt by Harry Wainwright to Class F1 between 1903 and 1919.

== Numbering ==
Twelve unrebuilt locomotives survived into Southern Railway ownership on 1 January 1923 with random numbers between 22 and 241. All had been withdrawn by 1930.

== Accidents and incidents ==
- On 21 March 1898, an F class locomotive was hauling a passenger train which was in a rear-end collision with another at St Johns. London due to a signalman's error. Three people were killed and twenty were injured.
