= Brenda Forbes =

American actress

- Born: Dorothy Brenda Taylor; January 14, 1909; Wandsworth, London, UK
- Died: September 11, 1996 (aged 87); New York City, U.S.
- Occupation: Actress
- Years active: 1931–1995
- Spouse: Merrill Shepard (1947–86; his death)

Brenda Forbes (14 January 1909 – 11 September 1996) was a British-born American actress of stage and screen.

== Personal life ==
Born as Dorothy Brenda Taylor in Wandsworth, London, the daughter of Ernest John and Ethel Louise Taylor. Her mother was actress Mary Forbes, and her elder brother was actor Ralph Forbes (né Ralph Forbes Taylor). She made her first film appearance in 1935 and her last in 1995. She appeared on Broadway between 1931 and 1985, mostly in revivals of classics.

== Career ==
Forbes created the role of the outspoken maid, Wilson, in the original production of The Barretts of Wimpole Street opposite Katharine Cornell. She played the role in various revivals as well. She co-starred as Lady Vale in the 1967 musical Darling of the Day in which she and Peter Woodthorpe introduced the song Panache and appeared in the 1976 revival of My Fair Lady as Mrs. Higgins; also in that production was George Rose whom she starred with in the 1986 all star cast revival of Aren't We All?

On screen she appeared in several films over a 50-year period including The Imperfect Lady (1935) and Mrs. Miniver (1942). Her last role, a small one, was in The Jerky Boys: The Movie.

== Family ==
She was married to Merrill Shepard from 1947 until his death in 1986; they had no children.

== Death ==
She died from cancer in 1996, aged 87, in New York City.

== Filmography ==
Year	Title	Role	Notes
1935	The Perfect Gentleman	Penelope - the Maid	
1940	Vigil in the Night	Nora Dunn	
1941	Miss Polly	Patsy	
1942	This Above All	Mae - Singer	Uncredited
1942	Mrs. Miniver	Gladys (Housemaid)	
1944	The White Cliffs of Dover	Gwennie	
1995	The Jerky Boys: The Movie	Rich Woman with Necklace at Tut's	(final film role)
