= Herriard railway station =

Former railway station in England

Herriard
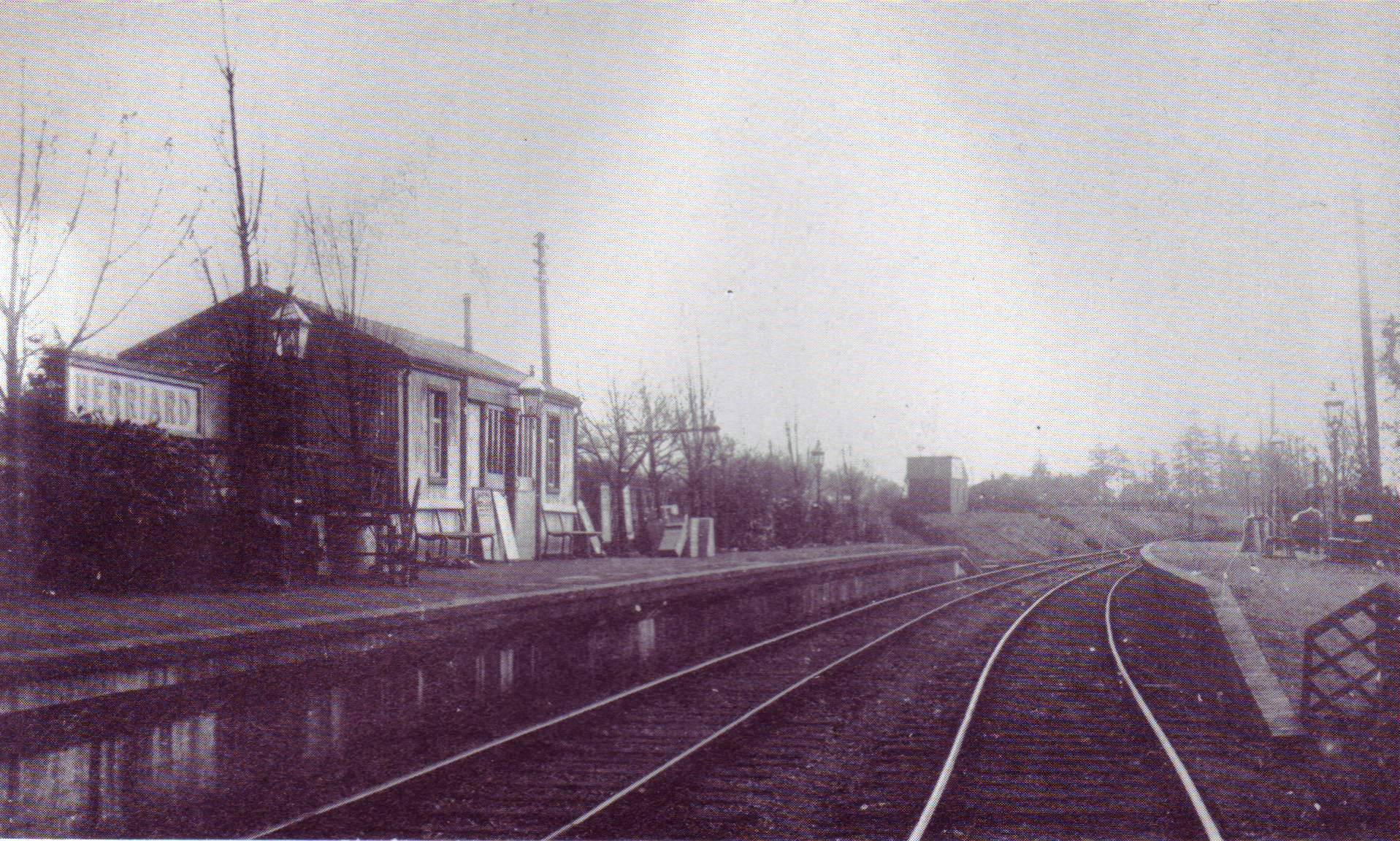

General information
- Location: Herriard, Basingstoke and Deane; England
- Coordinates: 51.2013°N 1.0466°W
- Grid reference: SU667451
- Platforms: 2

Other information
- Status: Disused

History
- Original company: Basingstoke and Alton Light Railway
- Pre-grouping: London and South Western Railway
- Post-grouping: Southern Railway

Key dates
- 1 June 1901: Station opened
- 1 January 1917: Closed
- 18 August 1924: Reopened
- 12 September 1932: Closed to passengers
- 1 June 1936: Closed to freight
Location

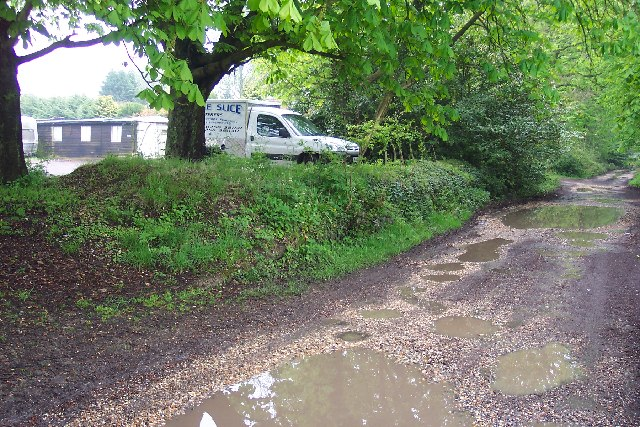
Station remains

Herriard railway station was a railway station in the village of Herriard, Hampshire, England. The station was a stop on the Basingstoke and Alton Light Railway until its closure in 1932. On Sunday, 19 August 1928, a crash scene from the film The Wrecker was filmed at Herriard. A set of SECR coaches and a Class F1 locomotive no. A148 were released on an incline to collide into a Foden steam lorry. As in 2020 the platforms survive as part of a garden wall either side of a roadway.

Preceding station	Disused railways	Following station
Cliddesden	Basingstoke and Alton Light Railway	Bentworth and Lasham
