= Girls' Dormitory =

1936 film by Irving Cummings

- Theatrical release poster
- Directed by: Irving Cummings
- Written by: Ladislas Fodor (play Matura); Gene Markey
- Produced by: Raymond Griffith
- Starring: Herbert Marshall; Ruth Chatterton; Simone Simon
- Cinematography: Merritt B. Gerstad
- Edited by: Jack Murray
- Distributed by: Twentieth Century-Fox Film Corporation
- Release date: August 8, 1936
- Running time: 66 minutes
- Country: United States
- Language: English
- Box office: $1 million

Girls' Dormitory is a 1936 American romance film directed by Irving Cummings based upon the 1934 play Mature by Ladislas Fodor, and adapted for the screen by Gene Markey.

== Plot ==
Set in the fictional Montreaux School for Girls in Switzerland, the main focus of the film is Dr. Stephen Dominick, the school's popular director who is secretly admired by teacher Professor Anna Mathe and the 19-year-old French student Marie Claudel. At a state fair, the girls draw lots to see who gets to ask Dr. Dominick for a dance. Marie wins and nervously asks Dr. Dominick. Because he thinks it is inappropriate to dance with a student, he refuses, causing Marie to burst out in tears and run away. Thereby, she is late for the bus, returning to the boarding school.

A week later, Professor Augusta Wimmer, a strict, unlikable woman, goes through the personal belongings of her students and finds a discarded love letter. Dr. Dominick and Professor Mathe are assigned to find out who wrote the letter, and conclude Marie is responsible due to the handwriting. Upon confronting her, she denies having written the letter, fearing Dr. Dominick will find out about her crush on him. Some of the uptight, old-fashioned teachers, including Professor Wimmer, suspect that while she was gone at the fair, she visited the supposed boyfriend the letter was addressed to. Because the strict rules at the school include not being allowed to date, Marie risks being suspended two days before graduation.

In tears, Marie admits to Professor Mathe that she wrote the letter to Dr. Dominick. Anna doesn't tell Dr. Dominick this, but lets him know the girl is innocent. They both sympathise with her and try to prevent further punishment. But the other teachers persist with their persecution and insist that her mother is summoned.

Desperate, Marie decides to run away, into a storm. Dr Dominick pursues her, and manages to catch up with her at some remote mountain hut. There, he fetches blankets for her and as he sits by her, she confesses her feelings for him. He admits to returning them. The next day, back at school, he proposes marriage and she accepts.

Shortly afterwards Marie overhears a conversation in which Professor Mathe admits to being in love with Dr. Dominick and that she will leave the school because she is heartbroken. Trying to prevent this, Marie lies to Dr. Dominick by saying that she lied to him about being in love with him, claiming that she only told him she loved him so she would be able to graduate.

Soon after graduation, Marie is about to be driven back home by her cousin Vallais from a nightclub where they were having a small celebration party, when she is suddenly visited by Dr. Dominick. He tells her he could never fall in love with Anna, after which they kiss.

== Cast ==
- Herbert Marshall as Dr. Stephen Dominick
- Ruth Chatterton as Professor Anna Mathe
- Simone Simon as Marie Claudel
- Constance Collier as Professor Augusta Wimmer
- J. Edward Bromberg as Dr. Spindler
- Dixie Dunbar as Luisa
- John Qualen as Toni
- Shirley Deane as Fritzi
- Tyrone Power as Count Vallais
- Frank Reicher as Dr. Hoffenreich
- George Hassell as Dr. Willfinger
- Lynne Berkeley as Dora
- June Storey as Greta
- Christian Rub as Forester
- Rita Gould as Professor Emma Kern
- Peggy Montgomery as Student
- Lynn Bari as Student (uncredited)

== Reception ==
The film was Simone Simon's first American film. The press praised her performance, with The Hollywood Reporter noting that "Hers is a performance unprecedented in Hollywood productions. Fresh, bright and alive, her face mirrors expressions with an ease that transcends acting". Writing for The Spectator in 1936, Graham Greene gave the film a mild mixed review, describing it as "dewy" and "undoubtedly sexy", and ultimately concluding that "its concentrated atmosphere of young innocence defeats its own purpose". Greene praised the acting of Simon and Bromberg, and the directing generally.

== See also ==
- A Very Young Lady (1941)
