= Miss Polly =

1941 film by Fred Guiol

- Directed by: Fred Guiol; John E. Burch (assistant)
- Screenplay by: Eugene Conrad; Edward E. Seabrook
- Produced by: Hal Roach
- Starring: ZaSu Pitts; Slim Summerville; Kathleen Howard; Brenda Forbes; Elyse Knox; Richard Clayton
- Cinematography: Robert Pittack
- Edited by: Richard C. Currier
- Music by: Edward Ward
- Production company: Hal Roach Studios
- Distributed by: United Artists
- Release date: November 14, 1941
- Running time: 45 minutes
- Country: United States
- Language: English
- Budget: $118,854
- Box office: $203,282

Miss Polly is a 1941 American comedy film produced as part of Hal Roach's Streamliners series. It was directed by Fred Guiol, written by Eugene Conrad and Edward E. Seabrook and stars ZaSu Pitts, Slim Summerville, Kathleen Howard, Brenda Forbes, Elyse Knox and Richard Clayton. The film was released on November 14, 1941 by United Artists.

== Plot ==
In the very old-fashioned small town of Midfield, there hasn't been a marriage in more than two years and the young people are slowly leaving the town. Minerva Snodgrass, the strict and assertive leader of the town's Purity League, has created numerous restrictions to keep the girls and boys apart. Her next-door neighbor is Miss Panadora Polly, a friendly and tolerant old maid who lives with her handyman (and catastrophic hobby inventor) Slim Wilkins and her housekeeper and companion Patsy.

Miss Polly tries to shelter the young romance between Minerva's daughter Barbara and her boyfriend Eddie, who is frustrated that Barbara remains under her mother's influence. To give Barbara courage, Miss Polly finds a mysterious liquor in her cellar that once made her shy sister marry a man. She tries the drink and as a result, she flirts with the young grocery boy and buys the sexiest dress in town.

In her new dress, Miss Polly visits the town meeting held by the mayor and Mrs. Snodgrass, who wants to establish new rules and has most of the townspeople under her control. But Miss Polly, courageous under the influence of the romance liquor, disagrees and wants to afford more freedom to the young people in town. Polly reminds the elderly and middle-aged meeting members of their own youthful indiscretions and slowly brings them to her side. Minerva states that she was always morally right during her life, but Miss Polly remembers that Minerva had an affair many years ago. Minerva collapses and, as there is no water nearby, Slim and Patsy offer her the romantic liquor to drink. Under the drink's spell, she now agrees to the marriage between Barbara and Eddie and develops a crush on Slim, chasing after him.

== Cast ==
- ZaSu Pitts as Miss Pandora Polly
- Slim Summerville as Slim Wilkins
- Kathleen Howard as Mrs. Minerva Snodgrass
- Brenda Forbes as Patsy
- Elyse Knox as Barbara Snodgrass
- Richard Clayton as Eddie
- Dink Trout as Old Postman Wilbur Boggs
- William Newell as New Postman Hubert
- Ferris Taylor as Mayor Walsh
- Mickey Daniels as Elmer, the Grocery Boy
- Fern Emmett as Mrs. Frisbee
- Sarah Edwards as Angie Turner
- Virginia Sale as Orsina Wiggins
- Walter Baldwin as Lem Wiggins
- Vera Lewis as Elvira Pennywinkle
- Jim Farley as Jim Pennywinkle (uncredited)
- George Pembroke as Town Constable
- Syd Saylor as Drug Store Owner
