= The Flying Fool (1931 film) =

1931 film directed by Walter Summers

- Directed by: Walter Summers
- Written by: Walter Summers; Bernard Merivale; Arnold Ridley
- Based on: The Flying Fool by Arnold Ridley & Bernard Merivale
- Starring: Henry Kendall; Benita Hume; Wallace Geoffrey; Ursula Jeans
- Cinematography: Claude Friese-Greene; Stanley Rodwell; James Wilson
- Edited by: Walter Stokvis
- Music by: John Reynders
- Production company: British International Pictures
- Distributed by: Wardour Films
- Release date: 1 August 1931
- Running time: 77 minutes
- Country: United Kingdom
- Language: English

The Flying Fool is a 1931 British comedy thriller film directed by Walter Summers and starring Henry Kendall, Benita Hume and Wallace Geoffrey. It was written by Summers, Arnold Ridley and Bernard Merrivale, based on Ridley and Merrivale's successful 1929 West End play of the same title.

== Plot ==
Vincent Floyd, a seeming lazy figure lounging around London Gentlemen's Clubs is in fact a secret agent hot on the trail of Michael Marlowe whom he suspects of smuggling drugs into Britain from France on a regular basis. Floyd has so far struggled to gain evidence on Marlowe, but through a series of incidents finds himself bound for Paris on the same plane as Marlowe. Marlowe succeeds in doping Floyd and taking him to his underground hideout beneath a Parisian back-alley nightclub.

With the help of Marion, a young woman who has been working for Marlowe, Floyd manages to escape the flooding dungeon linked to the River Seine which he has been trapped in. He flies back to England, pursued by Marlowe's gang and manages to avoid the attempts of his enemies to crash his plane. In a final confrontation, Floyd pursues Marlowe's car in a plane and prevents his escape.

== Cast ==
- Henry Kendall as Vincent Floyd
- Benita Hume as Marion Lee
- Wallace Geoffrey as Michael Marlowe
- Martin Walker as Jim Lancer
- Ursula Jeans as Morella Arlen
- Barbara Gott as Madame Charron
- Charles Farrell as Ponder
- Syd Crossley as Hicks

== Production ==
It was made by British International Pictures at Elstree Studios with sets designed by art directors Clarence Elder and John Mead. Originally Leslie Howard had been intended to star, but instead the role was given to the lead in the play, Henry Kendall. Filming began in December 1930,and included large amounts of location shooting. Both the director and Kendall, were able to fly during filming scenes. Co-operation was received from Imperial Airways, the French Air Union and the De Havilland Aircraft Company for the aviation sequences.

== Reception ==
Film Weekly wrote: "If Walter Summers wanted to prove that Britain could produces action thriller as good as any American picture of the same type he has achieved his object. If he wanted to make a melodrama that would not fail to excite, he has done that too."

Picture Show wrote: "Fast-moving air melodrama centring round the activities of a Home Office agent's pursuit of a gang of crooks. Excellent acting, with plenty of thrills and civil aviation behind the scenes, Well directed and photographed,"
