= Jeffrey Dell =

British film director and screenwriter (1899–1985)

- Born: John Edward Flowers Dell; 7 May 1899; Shoreham-by-Sea, West Sussex, England
- Died: 24 February 1985 (aged 85); Haslemere, Surrey, England
- Occupations: Director, screenwriter
- Years active: 1932–1966
- Spouses: Brenda Callum (m. 1924; div. 1933) (one son) Eileen Weatherstone (m. 1934; div. 1934) Jill Craigie (m. 1938; div. 1948) Barbara Poxon (m. 1948) (two daughters)
- Children: 3

John Edward Flowers "Jeffrey" Dell (7 May 1899 – 24 February 1985) was a British writer, screenwriter, and film director. He is also remembered for his 1939 novel Nobody Ordered Wolves, a satire on the British film industry. His other novels include News for Heaven (1944) and The Hoffmann Episode (1954). He co-wrote the 1937 play Blondie White, later adapted into a Hollywood film. Dell was the son of John Edward Dell (1875–1936) and Gertrude Dell (née Flowers; 1874–1947).

== Filmography ==
=== Director ===
- The Flemish Farm (1943)
- Don't Take It to Heart (1948)
- It's Hard to Be Good (1948)
- The Dark Man (1951)
- Carlton-Browne of the F.O. (co-director, 1959)

=== Screenwriter ===
- Sanders of the River (1935)
- Secret Lives (1937)
- Make-Up (1937)
- Night Alone (1938)
- Kate Plus Ten (1938)
- Freedom Radio (1941)
- The Saint's Vacation (1941)
- Thunder Rock (1942)
- The Flemish Farm (1943)
- Don't Take It to Heart (1944)
- It's Hard to Be Good (1948)
- The Dark Man (1951)
- Lucky Jim (1957)
- Brothers in Law (1957)
- Happy Is the Bride (1958)
- As the Sea Rages (1959)
- The Treasure of San Teresa (1959)
- Cone of Silence (1960)
- A French Mistress (1960)
- Suspect (1960)
- Rotten to the Core (1965)
- The Family Way (1966)

=== Adapted from his works ===
- Payment Deferred (1932)
- The Firebird (1934)
- Spies of the Air (1939)
- Footsteps in the Dark (1941)
