= A Very Young Lady =

1941 film by Harold D. Schuster

- Directed by: Harold D. Schuster
- Screenplay by: Elaine Ryan
- Based on: Matura (play) by Ladislas Fodor
- Produced by: Robert Kane
- Starring: Jane Withers; Nancy Kelly; John Sutton; Janet Beecher; Richard Clayton; June Carlson
- Cinematography: Edward Cronjager
- Edited by: James B. Clark
- Music by: David Buttolph; Cyril J. Mockridge
- Production company: 20th Century Fox
- Distributed by: 20th Century Fox
- Release date: June 27, 1941
- Running time: 80 minutes
- Country: United States
- Language: English

A Very Young Lady is a 1941 American comedy film directed by Harold D. Schuster and starring Jane Withers and Nancy Kelly. It was produced and distributed by Twentieth Century Fox. It was based on the play Matura by Ladislas Fodor which had previously been adapted by the studio into the 1936 film Girls' Dormitory.

== Synopsis ==
Kitty Russell is sent to a finishing school to tame her manners. While there she develops a crush on the headteacher Doctor Franklin Meredith, who is also the target of admiration from one of the female teachers.

== Cast ==
- Jane Withers as Kitty Russell
- Nancy Kelly as Alice Carter
- John Sutton as Dr. Franklin Meredith
- Janet Beecher as Miss Steele
- Richard Clayton as Tom Brighton
- June Carlson as Madge
- Charles Halton as Oliver Brixton
- Cecil Kellaway as Professor Starkweather
- Marilyn Kinsley as Susie
- JoAnn Ransom as Linda
- Catherine Henderson as Jean
- Lucita Ham as Sarah
- June Horne as Beth
- Eddie Acuff as Sheriff Bill Stone
- Dorothy Moore as Miss Clayton
- William Edmunds as Abner
- Henry Roquemore as Stationmaster

== See also ==
- Girls' Dormitory (1936)

== Bibliography ==
- Fetrow, Alan G. Feature Films, 1940-1949: a United States Filmography. McFarland, 1994.
- Goble, Alan. The Complete Index to Literary Sources in Film. Walter de Gruyter, 1999.
