= Basingstoke and Alton Light Railway =

Coordinates: 51°16′8.88″N 1°5′16.66″W

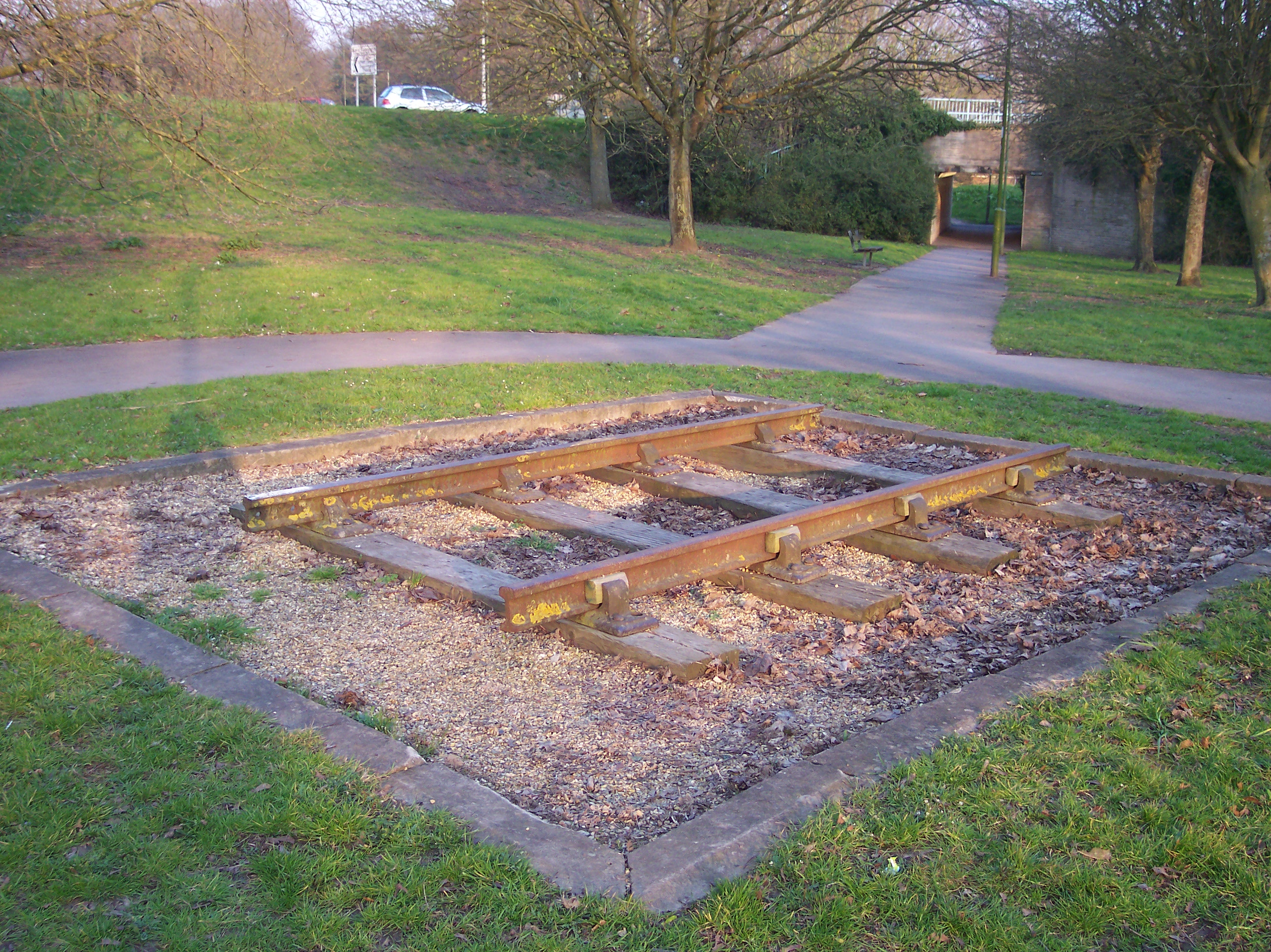
- Section of vintage track representing the Basingstoke and Alton Light Railway, on the Viables Roundabout in Basingstoke.

Overview
- Status: Closed
- Owner: London and South Western Railway; Southern Railway
- Locale: Basingstoke; Hampshire
- Termini: Basingstoke; Alton

Service
- Type: Light rail
- Operator(s): London and South Western Railway; Southern Railway

History
- Opened: 1901
- Closed: January 1917, reopened August 1924, final closure 12 September 1932 (passengers); 1936 (freight)

Technical
- Track gauge: 1,435 mm (4 ft 8 1/2 in) standard gauge

The Basingstoke and Alton Light Railway was opened in 1901, by the London and South Western Railway. It was the first English railway authorised under Light Railway legislation. It ran through unpromising, lightly populated terrain, and was probably built only to exclude competitors from building a line in the area. It had steep gradients and a line speed limit of 20 mph, later raised to 25 mph.

It never attracted much business and the hoped-for through traffic never materialised. When the War Office demanded recovered track for laying in France, during the First World War, the LSWR closed the line and lifted the track, in 1917.

After the war, local pressure mounted to reinstate the railway; this was resisted by the Southern Railway, which had taken over from the LSWR. The SR had no wish to spend considerable sums to reopen a railway that had lost money and had no positive prospects. A House of Lords Committee effectively forced the SR to resume operation, which it did in 1924. Losses mounted and business declined further, and the line was closed to passengers in 1932, with limited goods services continuing until 1936.

Before closure a film company staged a train crash with the co-operation of the LSWR, and the event appeared in a feature film.

== History ==
=== Early proposals ===
The London and Southampton Railway completed its line in 1839, and reached Gosport the following year. Gosport was its station for Portsmouth, which with Southampton was important because of its maritime connection. The London and Southampton Railway changed its name to the London and South Western Railway (LSWR), and became the dominant railway operator in the area south of Basingstoke.

In 1848 a small chink in that dominance was created when the Great Western Railway, a great rival to the LSWR, opened a line from Reading to Basingstoke.

In 1865 the Mid-Hants Railway opened its line between Alton and Winchester. It had been promoted independently, hoping to form a new through route between London and Southampton. This did not endear it to the LSWR, for whom their main line route to Southampton was a prime part of its business, but the LSWR worked the line, and later absorbed it. It never rose to commercial success. In 1885 another incursion into the LSWR area of influence was made, when the Didcot, Newbury and Southampton Railway opened its north – south line. It was sponsored by the Great Western Railway, but it failed to generate enough investment to pay to reach Southampton, and its Winchester extremity forced it to rely on the LSWR.

Many of the lines on the district seemed to be on a north-east to south-west trajectory, leading from London to points on the Hampshire or Dorset coast. From time to time, lines running directly from north to south were put forward. The topography in that direction was difficult, consisting of high ground between deep broad valleys. At the same time the chalk geology led to poor agricultural land and a low population density.

In 1884 the Great Western Railway and the LSWR had agreed on territorial boundaries: neither would encourage the building of new lines that encroached on the established area of the other. When in the same year a Basingstoke to Alton Railway was proposed independently, it received no support from the LSWR, on which it would be dependent at each end, and the scheme foundered. The London Brighton and South Coast Railway made a similar agreement, and schemes for new railways from Portsmouth northward, pressed for by Portsmouth interests, ran into the same obstacle.

In 1896 a Portsmouth, Basingstoke and Godalming Railway Bill came to Parliament. It failed, but the LSWR board decided that they needed to respond to the pressure for such a line, in case some rival might do so instead. The Basingstoke connection might invite the LBSCR (at Portsmouth) to link up with the GWR (at Basingstoke). On 25 June 1896 the LSWR Board approved two new schemes: a Basingstoke to Alton line, and a line from Alton down the Meon Valley to Fareham.

=== Reason to build the line ===
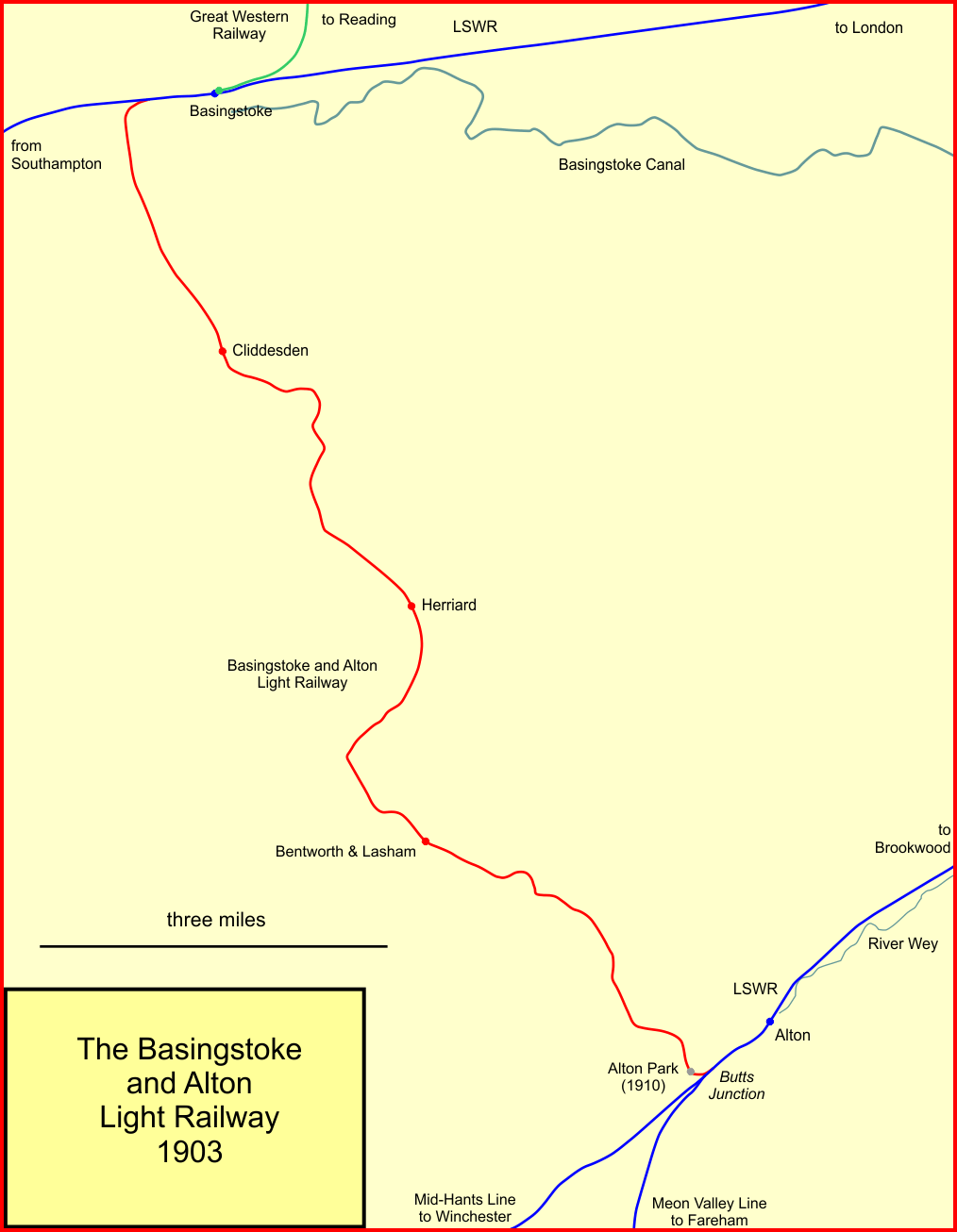
Basingstoke and Alton Light Railway system in 1903

The line was designed to run through a thinly populated agricultural area. Although it connected neatly on a map to the (proposed) Meon Valley Railway, it would be a 20 mph light railway, with several 10 mph open level crossings, and it was unlikely to form part of a trunk route.

Dean, etc., wrote that "It has been said that the LSWR planned the Light Railway as a "blocking line", to keep the GWR out of its territory. There is no evidence that this was so."

Kelly, writing in 1900 was quite sure that the line was built as a spoiler against a Great Western Railway connection to Portsmouth:

Some little time ago the Great Western had a project for connecting Paddington and Portsmouth by a railway, running through the same district... Thus the London and South Western have secured for themselves another preserve, and when the Meon Valley Line is finished, there will be a connection between Portsmouth and Salisbury. "There are not enough people along the route to pay for grease for the engines", a man was heard pointedly to observe, but we may see plenty of heavy goods trains run along this light railway, as it is called."

Maggs is quite explicit:

When the GWR proposed a line from Basingstoke to Portsmouth, the House of Lords Committee decided that a light railway, or railways, for Basingstoke-Alton-Fareham would be adequate as Portsmouth was already well-served by main lines. The result was that the LSWR constructed the Basingstoke & Alton Light Railway and the Alton to Fareham line.

=== Authorisation ===
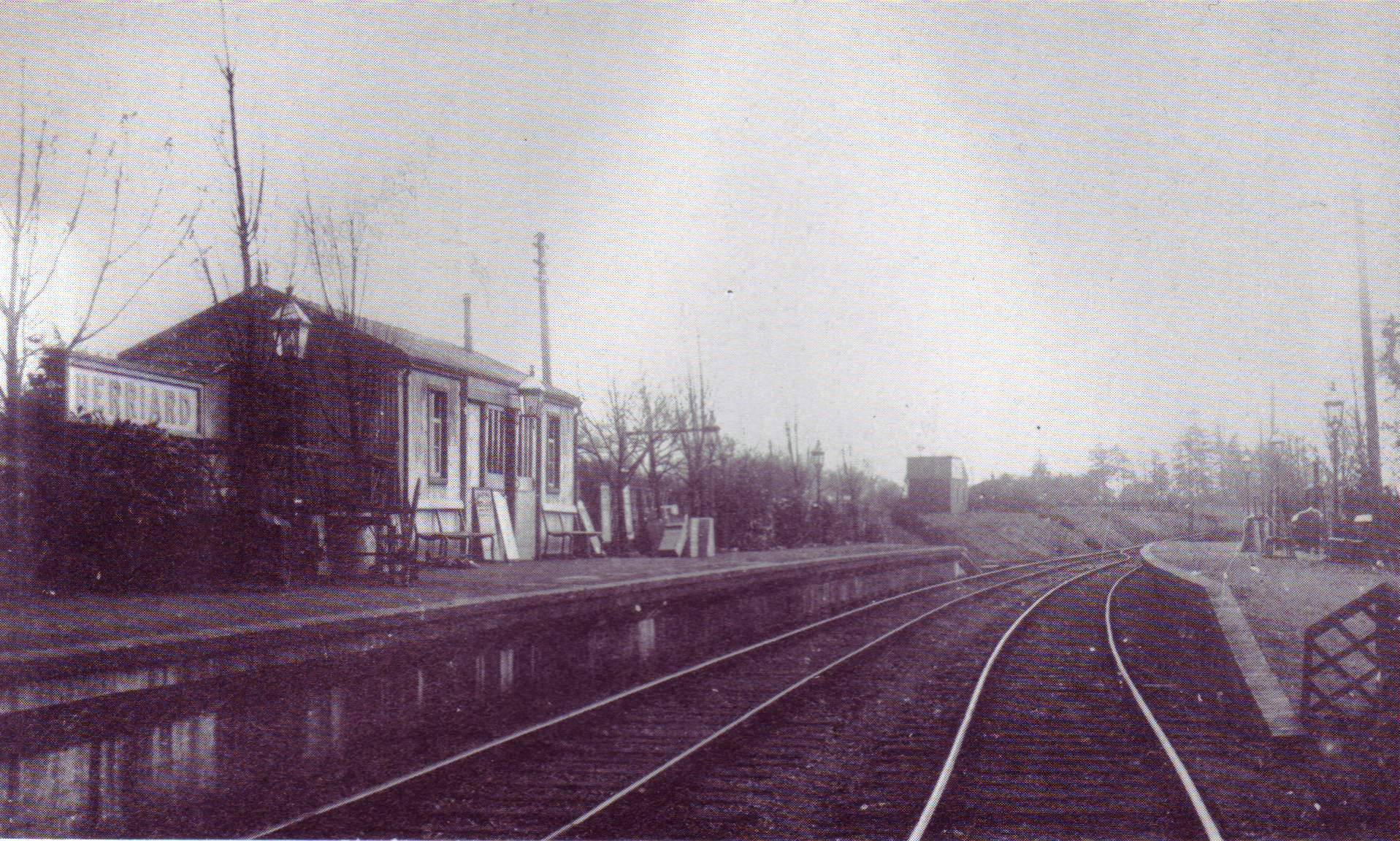
Herriard railway station

Coincidentally in 1896 the Light Railways Act 1896 was passed. This was designed to stimulate local transport development by enabling the authorisation of railway schemes without the expense of getting a parliamentary bill. The LSWR board saw that their proposed line between Basingstoke and Alton was well suited for construction as a light railway, and on 31 December 1896 an application to the Light Railway Commissioners was lodged. The cost would be £66,714. In an indication of the traffic volumes expected, there was to be a burrowing junction at Basingstoke, so that arriving trains could enter the up (north) side of the LSWR station. At Alton the railway would make a junction with the Mid-Hants Line some distance west of Alton, entering Alton over that line. The junction was later named Butts Junction.

The authorisation process was not swift, and it was on 9 December 1897 that the Basingstoke and Alton Light Railway Order 1897 was issued. The sum of £51,000 could be raised for the construction. Land for a double track was purchased, but earthworks were made for a single line only. It was the first English railway authorised under the Light Railways Act 1896.

Although the light railway order had been passed, taking into account submissions from public bodies, some local authorities nevertheless made a number of objections at this stage. The objectors were very persistent, and after an appeal hearing on 28 June 1899, the railway company was directed to provide gates at five level crossings, incurring additional staff costs, and to alter the planned location of the Cliddesden station.

Major Pringle of the Board of Trade inspected the line on 7 May 1901, and apart from some minor matters, found it satisfactory for passenger operation.

=== Opening of the line ===
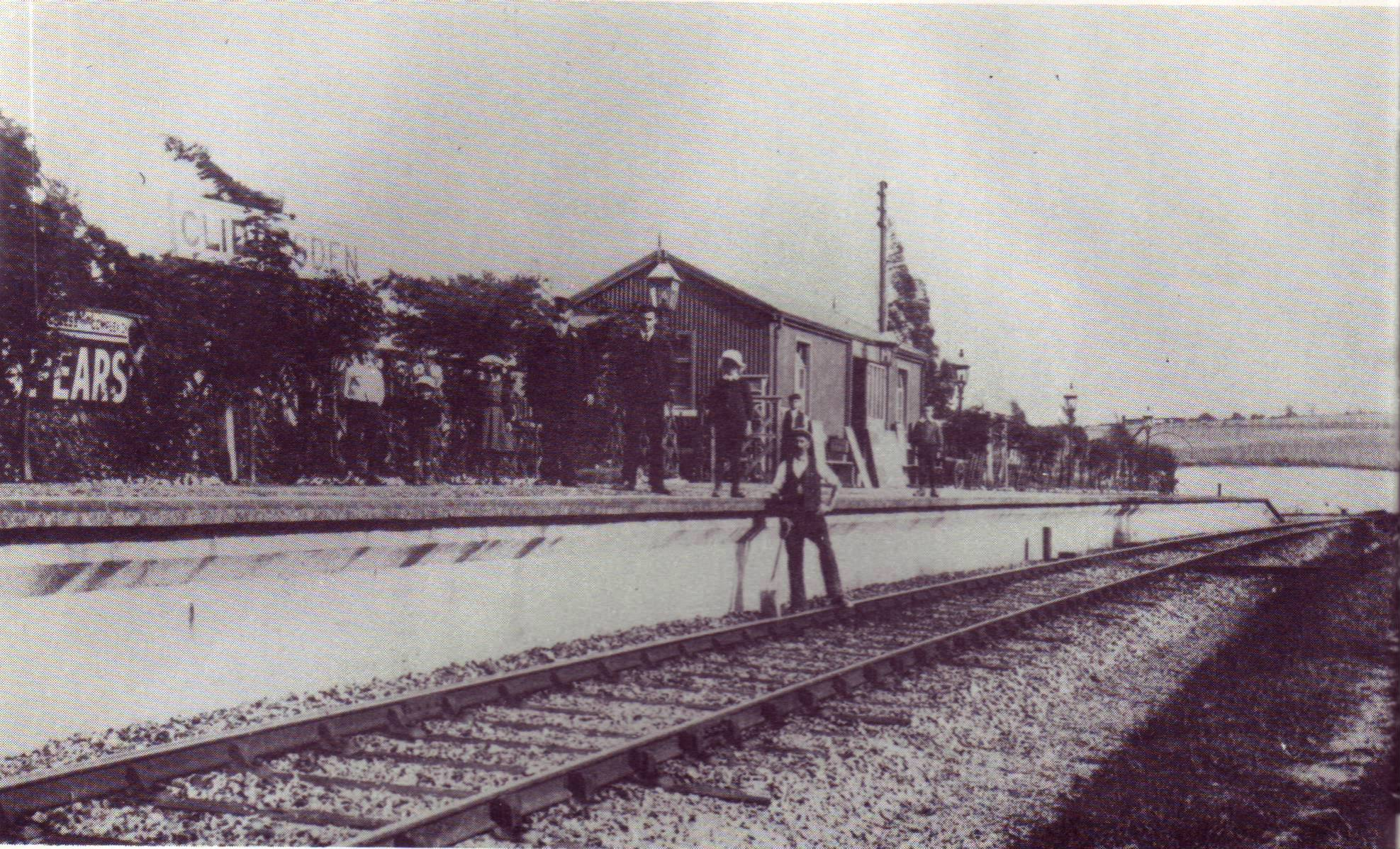
Cliddesden Railway Station

The line opened on 1 June 1901. About 50 tickets were sold on the first day. The planned burrowing junction at Basingstoke was never built.

A local newspaper observed "The man in the street expects to find the village somewhere near the station. But such little details do not trouble the promoters of railways... The three intermediate stations are named Cliddesden, Herriard, and Bentworth & Lasham respectively. But the villages bearing those names are a long way from the stations and not a glimpse of them can be seen from the train."

The train service was three mixed trains each way daily except Sundays, shortly increased to four. The line climbed at 1 in 50 for much of the way from Basingstoke nearly seven miles to Herriard, where there was a passing loop. From there it fell at a similar gradient for nearly a mile and a half, afterwards descending at more moderate gradients. There were numerous sharp curves on the line. The general speed limit was set at 20 mph, reduced to 10 mph on certain curves and approaching several level crossings.

=== Poor traffic volumes ===
The income from the line was disappointingly low, and on 1 July 1904 railmotors were introduced on the line, the two examples having been constructed specially. Braking was by hand only and lighting by oil. They were not operationally successful, being incapable of surmounting the steep gradients on the line, and of handling goods wagons in a mixed train formation. They were redeployed elsewhere on 12 August 1904.

On reinstatement of conventional train operation, the train service was increased to five passenger trains and a separate goods train. The change incurred additional operating costs, but saved considerable journey time, as the passenger trains were not required to shunt at goods sidings. In April 1905 permission was given from the Board of Trade in the Basingstoke and Alton Light Railway (Speed Amendment) Order 1905 to increase the line speed to 25 mph, and the journey time Basingstoke to Alton was reduced from 54 minutes to 44 minutes.

In 1908 a former Boer War army hospital near Alton was reopened as a children's tuberculosis hospital, and a siding connection was installed, for coal and other supplies needed by the building. Wagons were winched over the steeply graded siding. A platform called Alton Park was opened near the hospital; it was available for visitors to the hospital only.

=== Wartime suspension and re-instatement later ===
During World War I there was a demand for railway track equipment to lay in occupied France, and requisition allocations were given by the War Office to the railway companies. To fulfil its obligation the LSWR decided to close the Basingstoke and Alton line at short notice and recover the track from there. The line was heavily loss making, and the selection was commercially driven. The line closed on 1 January 1917.

In 1921 pressure began to develop locally for the line to be reopened. A board meeting in 1921 considered the financial prospects, and was informed that the line had actually cost £107,842 to build. In 1913 (the last full year before the war) receipts had been £1,232 and operational costs had been £5,400.

The considerable pressure to reopen led to a hearing by a House of Lords committee lasting three days in May 1923. The Grouping of the railways had just been implemented, following the Railways Act 1921. Many emotional arguments were put by those claiming that the Southern Railway, as successor to the LSWR, had an obligation to expend considerable sums to rebuild a heavily loss-making minor railway. Despite objective evidence, the Lords Committee called upon the Southern Railway to reconsider – effectively an instruction to reopen the line.

The line reopened on 18 August 1924. The crossing loop at Herriard was not reinstated. There were three trains each way daily, except Sundays.

Despite record loadings on the first Basingstoke market day following this event, gross receipts for the first two weeks totalled only £94 against wage costs alone of £102.

=== Bus competition, and filming ===
In 1927 a local bus operator started running a route between Alton and Basingstoke. Running through the centre of the villages served, the bus immediately attracted custom and the light carryings on the railway reduced correspondingly.

In 1928 filming took place at Salter Hatch level crossing. Gainsborough Pictures were making a film whose plot centres on a road bus operator contriving train crashes to harm railway business. The Southern Railway co-operated with the filming, and provided an obsolete steam engine and six coaches, which were destroyed in the crash. A steam lorry loaded with five tons of ballast and a charge of explosive was on the level crossing, causing the collision. The filming took place on 19 August 1928, and the debris was removed and the line was in normal service the following day. The film was called The Wrecker (1928), and some of the footage was used again in Seven Sinners (1936).

=== Decline and closure ===
In 1932 the Southern Railway reconsidered the future of the branch service, as it was heavily loss-making. The decision was taken to close it, and the last passenger train operated on 10 September 1932, with one passenger on board. Parts of the line remained in use for goods traffic, from Basingstoke to Bentworth and Lasham, and from Butts Junction to Treloar Hospital. The Bentworth service was discontinued after the last train on 31 May 1936, and the Basingstoke stub was reduced to serve the Thornycroft private siding there.

Before all the track on the line had been recovered, Gainsborough Pictures once again negotiated use of the line for filming, this time for Oh, Mr Porter!, with Will Hay. A disguised Cliddesden railway station was used as the film's fictional Irish station of "Buggleskelly" and a simulated tunnel was constructed. Filming took place over several weeks from June 1937.

The remaining line sections were finally closed in 1967, at which time the entire Basingstoke and Alton system was no more.

== Topography ==
=== Gradients and curvature ===
The line climbed, mostly at 1 in 50, from Basingstoke to Herriard. From there it fell at 1 in 50 for a mile, and then at more moderate gradients nearly all the way to Butts Junction, approaching Alton. The line had a great extent of curved track; there was a series of sharp curves from Herriard to Butts Junction.

=== Locations ===
- Basingstoke; opened 10 June 1839; still open;
- Cliddesden railway station; opened 1 June 1901; closed 1 January 1917; reopened 18 August 1924; closed 12 September 1932;
- Herriard railway station; opened 1 June 1901; closed 1 January 1917; reopened 18 August 1924; closed 12 September 1932;
- Bentworth & Lasham railway station; opened 1 June 1901; closed 1 January 1917; reopened 18 August 1924; closed 12 September 1932;
- Treloar's Hospital Platform railway station also known as Alton Park and Cripples' Home Siding; not published to the public; inspected 14 April 1910 and presumed in use soon after; used for delivery of patients, and visitors; closed 11 September 1932; Founder's Day specials ran until 1960;
- Butts Junction.
