= Butts Junction =

Former railway junction in Hampshire, England

Coordinates: 51.140367°N 0.982847°W

Butts Junction was a railway junction located in Alton in Hampshire, England. The junction was the location at which the Basingstoke and Alton Light Railway and the Meon Valley Railway diverged from the Mid-Hants Railway which runs from Alton to Winchester. The junction became operational in 1901.

All of the Junction's railway lines had closed by 1973, with the Mid-Hants Railway subsequently reopening as a heritage railway known as the Watercress Line in 1977. The location of Butts Junction can still be seen from trains on the Watercress Line, with an embankment tailing off southwards towards Farringdon.

== Location ==
Butts Junction was located at grid reference SU711384 in an area southwest of Alton town centre known as The Butts, from which the junction takes its name. The Butts is a triangle of open land which in medieval times was used for archery practice, leading to its name in reference to the archery butts formerly located at the site. Butts Junction was just 20 chains (0.25 miles, 0.40 km) from the former Treloar's Hospital Platform railway station, and 1.05 miles (1.69 km) to Alton railway station located northeast of the junction. The railway crosses Butts Road at the junction over a bridge which was replaced with the opening of the line to Basingstoke.

The junction was home to an LSWR type 4 signal box which was built on the site in June 1903.
