= SECR F1 class =

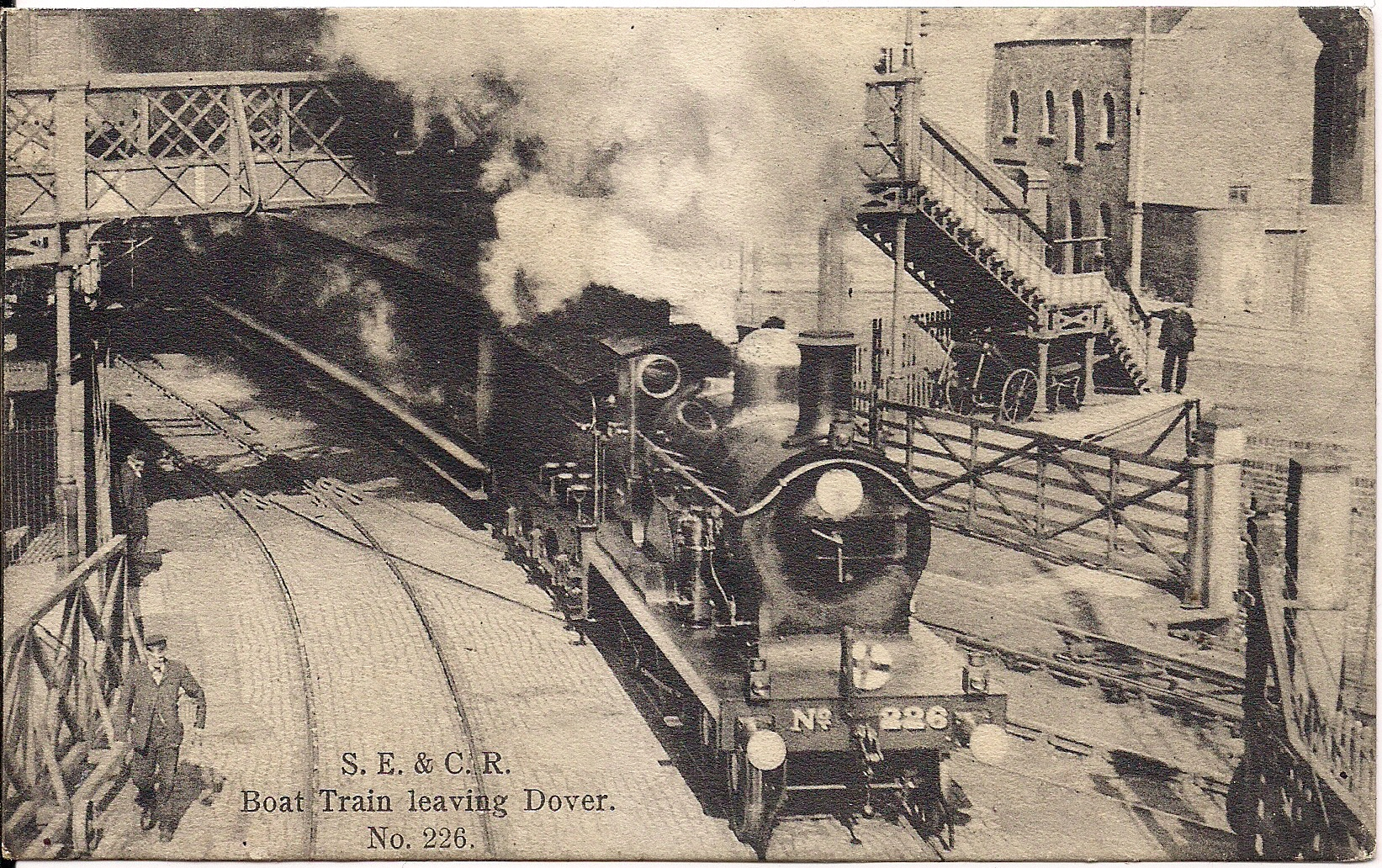
Type and origin
- Power type: Steam
- Designer: Harry Wainwright
- Builder: Ashford Works
- Rebuild date: 1903–1919
- Number rebuilt: 76
Specifications
- Configuration
  - Whyte: 4-4-0
  - UIC: 2′B
- Gauge: 4 ft 8 1/2 in (1,435 mm)
- Driver dia.: 7 ft 0 in (2.134 m)
- Loco weight: 45.1 long tons (45.8 t)
- Fuel type: Coal
- Boiler pressure: 170 psi (1.17 MPa)
- Cylinders: Two, inside
- Cylinder size: 18 in × 26 in (457 mm × 660 mm)
- Valve gear: Stephenson
Performance figures
- Tractive effort: 14,491 lbf (64.5 kN)
Career
- Operators: South Eastern and Chatham Railway; → Southern Railway; → Southern Region of British Railways
- Class: SECR/SR: F1
- Number in class: 1 January 1923: 75
- Nicknames: Jumbo
- Withdrawn: 1920–1949
- Disposition: All scrapped

The SECR F1 class was a series of 4-4-0 steam locomotives operated by the South Eastern and Chatham Railway. These locomotives were rebuilt from older Stirling F class locomotives by Harry Wainwright between 1903 and 1919.

== Numbering ==
Seventy-five locomotives were initially produced, and they were given the same numbers as the F class locomotives from which they were rebuilt; these were scattered between 2 and 250. One of these, no. 20, was badly damaged in an accident on 17 November 1919 and consequently withdrawn; to replace it, one further rebuild was carried out, this being no. 185. Apart from no. 20, all survived into Southern Railway (SR) ownership as of 1 January 1923. Their SR numbers were the same as their SECR numbers, but prefixed with the letter "A"; from the early 1930s, the "A" prefix was dropped and the original numbers increased by 1000. Apart from no. 20, withdrawal commenced in 1925, and some were withdrawn in most years until 1937, leaving 22 in service at the outbreak of World War II; withdrawal recommenced in 1944. Nine locomotives entered British Railways (BR) ownership in 1948. They were numbered thus:

SECR No.	First SR No.	Second SR No.	BR No.
2	A2	1002	31002
28	A28	1028	31028
31	A31	1031	31031
42	A42	1042	31042
78	A78	1078	31078
105	A105	1105	31105
151	A151	1151	31151
215	A215	1215	31215
231	A231	1231	31231

Withdrawal of these nine occurred during 1948–49, the last in service being no. 1231, withdrawn March 1949. None received BR livery, and only one, no. 31151, was actually given its allotted BR number.

== Accidents and incidents ==
- In August 1926, a locomotive overran buffers at London Bridge and crashed into a brewery.
- No. A148 was withdrawn in August 1928, and sold to the Gainsborough Pictures Corporation. On 19 August 1928, A148 was deliberately crashed into a lorry at Lasham, between Basingstoke and Alton, for the film The Wrecker. The remains were scrapped on site.
