= Peril at End House (play) =

- Original language: English
- Written by: Arnold Ridley
- Based on: Peril at End House by Agatha Christie

Premiere
- Date: 1 April 1940
- Place: Richmond Theatre

Peril at End House is a 1940 play based on the 1932 novel of the same name by Agatha Christie. The play is by Arnold Ridley, who was granted permission to adapt the book in an agreement with Christie dated 18 July 1938.

== Background ==
It was first performed on 1 April 1940 at the Richmond Theatre in London before moving to the Vaudeville Theatre where it opened on 1 May 1940. Despite some positive reviews, the play closed on 18 May after just twenty-three performances. The part of Hercule Poirot was played by Francis L. Sullivan who had previously played the role in Christie's 1930 play Black Coffee.

Ridley changed the name of two of the characters from the novel. Freddie Rice was renamed Frances Rice and Jim Lazarus (who in the novel was Jewish and was the subject of some Semitic references) became Terry Ord. Freddie's drug-addicted husband was billed as "A Stranger".

== Scenes ==
The action of the play takes place at St. Loo in Cornwall during the course of five days.

ACT I

- Scene 1 – Terrace of the Majestic Hotel
- Scene 2 – Hall at End House. The same evening.

ACT II

- Scene 1 – The same. Two nights later.
- Scene 2 – The same. Early next morning.
- Scene 3 – The same. The next day.

ACT III (During the course of this Act, the curtain is dropped to indicate the lapse of four hours.)

- The same. The next afternoon.

== Reception ==
The Times reviewed the play twice, firstly in its edition of 3 April 1940 when they commented on Sullivan's portrayal of Poirot stating that he "preserves the essentials of the man, and there is never any doubt that he is indeed the greatest detective in the world". They further commented that the nature of Christie's books meant that they "do not struggle and protest against the limitations of the stage as so many detective stories seem to do when they are adapted". The role of the 'stranger' in the play was felt to belong "to a cruder tradition" however "for the most part, the play is less a 'thriller' than a satisfactory exercise for those little grey cells M. Poirot possesses in such abundance".

The second reviewer, in the edition of 2 May 1940, felt that Poirot was too talkative and that "there are times when we should prefer that the syllogisms were acted rather than spoken, but talk is on the whole agreeably lucid and vivid, and though the solution, when it comes with a sudden rush of action, seems larger and more complicated than the mystery, it cannot be said that the tale anywhere conspicuously hangs fire".

Ivor Brown reviewed the play in The Observer's issue of 5 May 1940 when he said, "Miss Christie knows how to complicate a crime. Mr. Ridley sustains the mystery. The Cornish seas are packed with red herrings, and solvers will also have to keep an eye on some strange old trout. There let the matter rest. The form of entertainment is familiar. It took my mind back to the days of The Bat. In these affairs time does not march on, but M. Poirot agreeably passes by."."

"A.D." in The Guardian's review of 4 May 1940 said that the play was, "for those who delight in the complications of the crime novel in its most recent phases. It is wildly complicated, but is it engagingly so?" The reviewer seemed to prefer characters like Sherlock Holmes as a detective rather than Poirot and the "bafflement" that his cases brought. The reviewer then committed the cardinal sin of identifying the murderer in his somewhat ironically written final paragraph when he said, "There can be no harm in divulging that this play's apparent heroine is really its villainess. Mrs. Christie's readers will know it already. To the ignorant the fact will only be an exhausted torch in a cloudy black-out."

Bernard Buckham in the Daily Mirror of 3 May 1940 said the production, "has its exciting moments, but more action and less talk would have made it a better play."

== Cast of 1940 London production ==
- Francis L. Sullivan – Hercule Poirot
- Wilfred Fletcher – A Stranger
- Donald Bisset – Henry
- Tully Combe – Terry Ord
- Phoebe Kershaw – Frances Rice
- Ian Fleming – Captain Hastings
- Olga Edwardes – "Nick" Buckley
- William Senior – Commander Challenger
- Beckett Bould – Stanley Croft
- Josephine Middleton – Ellen
- Isabel Dean – Maggie Buckley
- Brian Oulton – Charles Vyse
- May Hallatt – Mrs Croft
- Charles Mortimer – Inspector Weston
- Margery Caldicott – Dr. Helen Graham
- Nancy Poultney – Janet Buckley

== Publication and further adaptations ==
The play was first published by Samuel French in February 1945 as French's Acting Edition 962, priced four shillings.

A radio version of the play was presented on the BBC Home Service on Saturday, 29 May 1948 from 9.20 to 10.45pm as part of the Saturday Night Theatre strand. The play was adapted by Mollie Greenhalgh, produced by William Hughes and starred Austin Trevor who had appeared in three films in the 1930s as Poirot: Alibi (1931), Black Coffee (1931) and Lord Edgware Dies (1934). Actor Ian Fleming reprised his role as Hastings from the stage version. The broadcast was repeated on Monday, 31 May 1948 on the Light Programme at 4.15pm as part of Monday Matinée.

Cast:

- Austin Trevor – Hercule Poirot
- Donald Bisset – Henry
- Graeme Muir – Terry Ord
- Althea Parker – Frances Rice
- Wilfred Fletcher – a Stranger
- Ian Fleming – Captain Hastings
- Jenny Lovelace – 'Nick' Buckley
- William Senior – Commander Challenger
- William Collins – Stanley Croft
- Josephine Middleton – Ellen
- Meg Simmons – Maggie Buckley
- Brian Oulton – Charles Vyse
- May Hallatt – Mrs Croft
- Howieson Culff – Inspector Weston
- Joan Clement Scott – Dr. Helen Graham
- Joan Hart – Janet Buckley
