= Bernard Merivale =

British playwright and screenwriter (1882–1939)

- Born: 15 July 1882; Newcastle-upon-Tyne, United Kingdom
- Died: 12 May 1939 (aged 56); London, United Kingdom
- Occupation: Writer
- Years active: 1918-1936 (film)

Bernard Merivale (1882–1939) was a British playwright and screenwriter.

Several of his plays were adapted into films including Blondie White, The Wrecker and The Unguarded Hour.

== Selected filmography ==
- The Flying Fool (1931)
- Condemned to Death (1932)
- When London Sleeps (1932)
- Seven Sinners (1936)

== Plays ==
- None But the Brave (1925)
- The Wrecker (1927)
- The Unguarded Hour (1935)
- Blondie White (1938)

== Bibliography ==
- Goble, Alan. The Complete Index to Literary Sources in Film. Walter de Gruyter, 1999.
- Kabatchnik, Amnon. Blood on the Stage, 1925-1950: Milestone Plays of Crime, Mystery and Detection. Scarecrow Press, 2010.
