= Bishops Sutton (hundred) =

The Hundred of Bishop's Sutton was a Hundred of Great Britain situated in the ceremonial county of Hampshire. The Hundred of Bishop's Sutton contained the parishes of; Alresford, Bighton, Bishop's Sutton, Bramdean, Farringdon, Headley, Ropley and West Tisted.

At the time of the Domesday Survey the hundred of Bishop's Sutton was known as the hundred of 'Esselei', and comprised the following places at the time were West Tisted, Bishop's Sutton (which also included Ropley) and Bramdean. The amount of the land assessed was 18 hides 1 virgate. Headley, which was included in Bishop's Sutton hundred in 1831, and is now in Alton Hundred, was entered under Neatham hundred, but was said to be reckoned as part of Esselei. Bighton at the time of the survey was included in Chuteley hundred. Ropley is not mentioned, but was most probably included in Bishop's Sutton. The land in Headley and Bighton was assessed at 12 hides, so that the total hidage of the land afterwards comprising Bishop's Sutton was about 30 hides. It is not possible to find out when the name of 'Esselei' disappeared and that of Bishop's Sutton was substituted.

== See also ==
- The Hundred of Odiham
- The Hundred of Meonstoke
- Edgegate (hundred)
