= Odiham (hundred) =

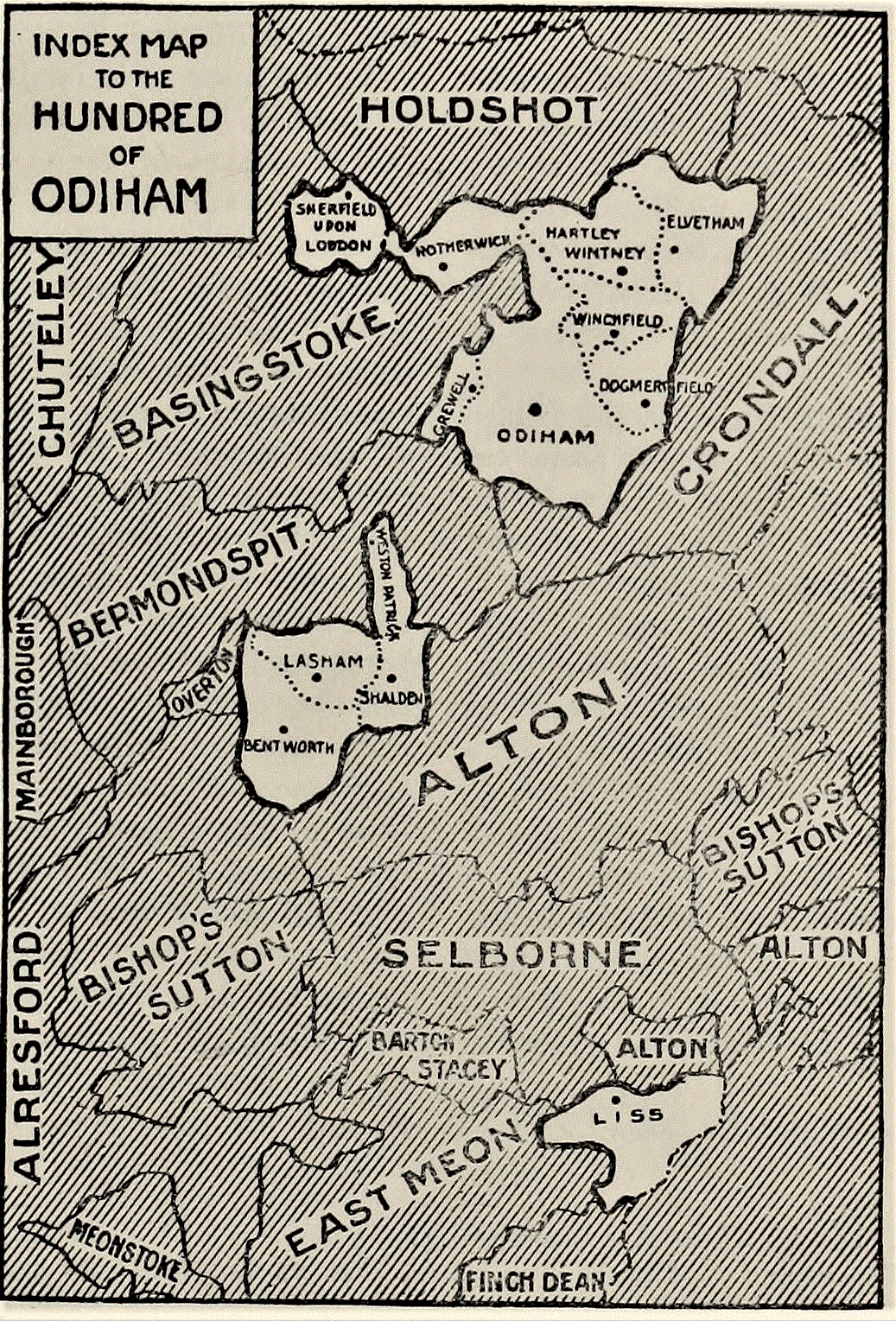
The Hundred of Odiham Index Map as known in the mid-1800s. The Odiham Hundred is highlighted in white.

The Hundred of Odiham was a Hundred (a geographical sub-division of the area of a County) of Great Britain in the county of Hampshire. It contained the parishes of; Bentworth, Dogmersfield, Elvetham, Greywell, Hartley Wintney, Lasham, Liss, Odiham, Rotherwick, Shalden, Sherfield on Loddon, Weston Patrick, and Winchfield.

At the time of the Domesday Survey the parishes contained in the modern hundred of Odiham were included in the two hundreds of Odiham and 'Hefedele'. The former comprised the villages of Lasham and Shalden and half a hide which had been taken from Preston Candover, and the latter included Odiham, Winchfield, Elvetham, Dogmersfield, and Bartley Heath (then "Berchelei").

But for the manors of Bentworth, Greywell, Hartley Wintney, Liss Turney, Rotherwick, Sherfield on Loddon, and Weston Patrick, there are no entries in the Domesday Survey, but they were all probably included in the large manor of Odiham. The manor of Liss Abbas remained until 1831 in Meonstoke Hundred.

== See also ==
- Bentworth (The Hundred of Odiham)
- The Hundred of Bishops Sutton
- The Hundred of Meonstoke
- Edgegate (hundred)
