= Meonstoke (hundred) =

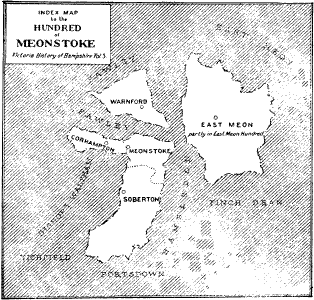
The Meonstoke Hundred as known in the mid-1880s. The Hundred of Meonstoke is highlighted in white.

The Hundred of Meonstoke was a small Hundred of Great Britain situated in the ceremonial county of Hampshire. The Hundred of Meonstoke contained the parishes of; Abbots Worthy, Alverstoke, Corhampton, Exton, Hambledon, Liss, Meonstoke, Soberton, Warnford, and West Meon (which was partly in the East Meon Hundred). Before the time of the Domesday Survey, Bramdean was included in the Meonstoke Hundred until it was transferred to the Finchdean Hundred. The land comprising the hundred was assessed in the reign of Edward the Confessor at 89 hides, and at the time of the Domesday survey of 1086 was estimated to be about 56 hides and comprised 12 places in Hampshire.

By the beginning of the fourteenth century the area of the hundred had much decreased. West Meon, Exton, Alverstoke, Abbots Worthy, Liss and a large part of the parish of Hambledon had been removed and transferred into the Odiham Hundred. From this date the extent of the hundred remained practically unchanged until after 1831.

This hundred has always belonged to the Crown. In a survey of the hundred taken in the Commonwealth period it was stated that the courts-leet and law-days of the hundred were still then held at Easter and Michaelmas and that the three-weeks' courts or sheriff's tourns were also regularly held.

The Hundred of Meonstoke is one of the smallest hundreds in Hampshire.

== See also ==
- The Hundred of Odiham
- The Hundred of Bishops Sutton
- Edgegate (hundred)
