= History of Christchurch, Dorset =

History of English town

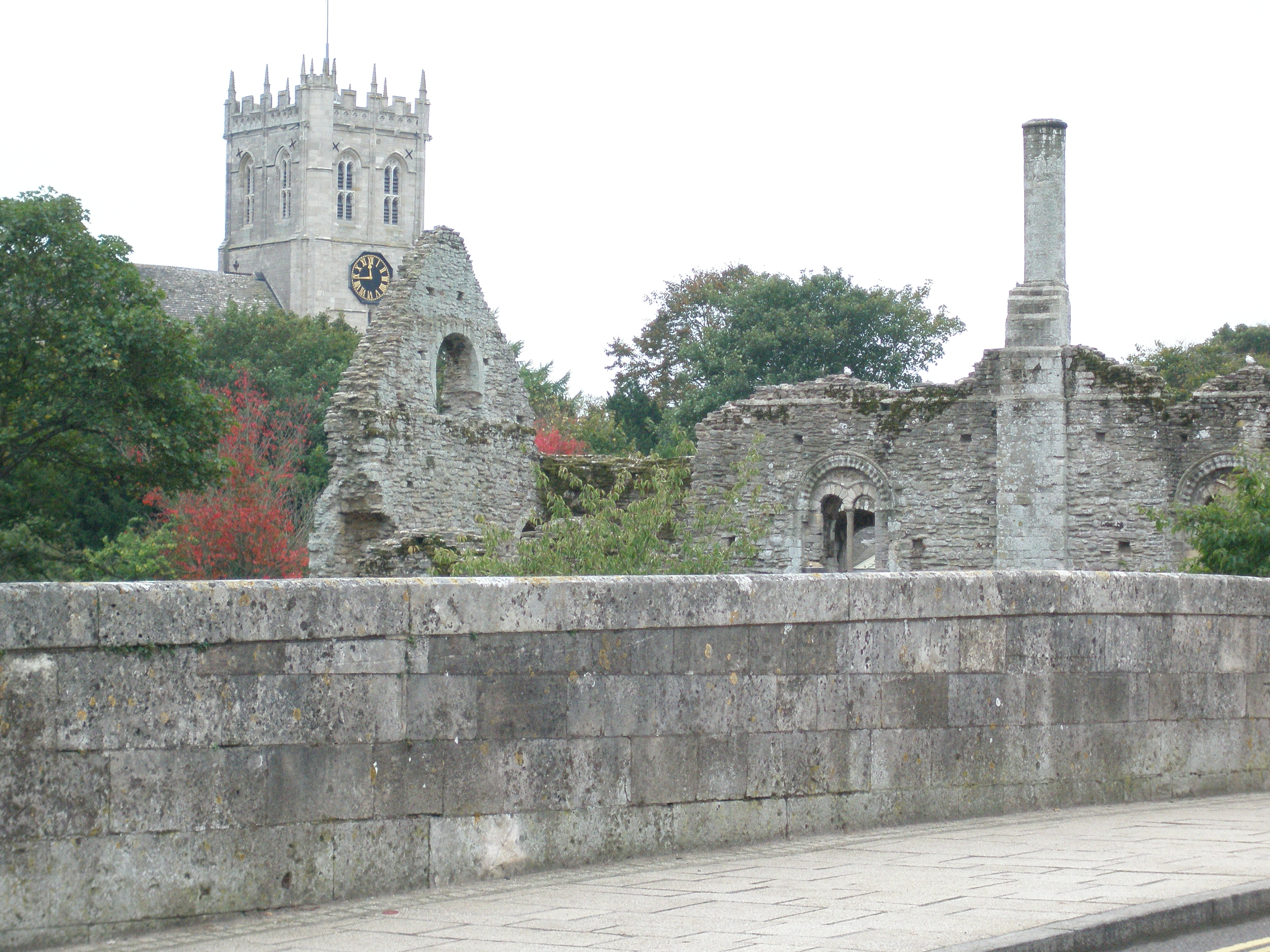
The Constable's House and Priory; seen from the Town Bridge.

Christchurch is a town, civil parish and former borough in the county of Dorset on the English Channel coast, adjoining Bournemouth in the west, with the New Forest to the east. Historically in Hampshire, it joined Dorset with the reorganisation of local government in 1974 and is the most easterly borough in the county. The town has existed since 650 AD and its close proximity to the Cotentin Peninsula made it an important trading port and a potential target for invasion during the Napoleonic and Second World Wars.

Situated at the lowest crossing points of the Avon and Stour, it was originally known as Twynham, from "tweon eam", meaning (the settlement) between two rivers. It was not until the construction of the priory in 1094 that the town became known as Christchurch. In Saxon times the harbour was one of the most important in England and the town became both a Royal manor and a burgh. During its turbulent history, the town has witnessed battles between Saxons, when Aethelwold stormed the ramparts; between Royalists and Parliamentarians during the civil war, and between smugglers and excise men during the 18th century.

Today the town is a popular tourist destination, with one-and-a-half-million annual visitors.

== Early history ==
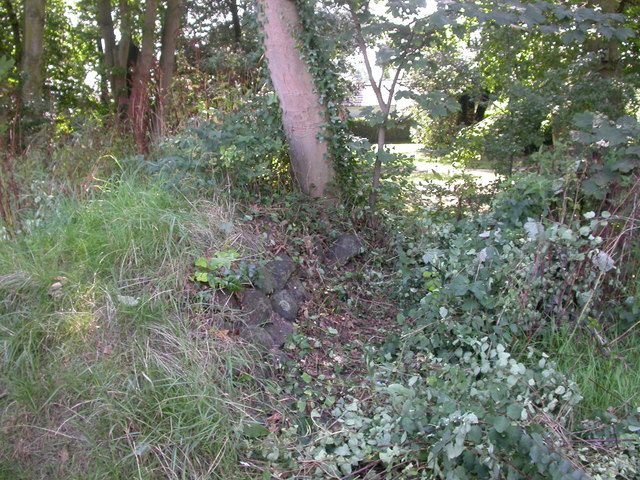
Part of the old Saxon town wall. Reported to be the only surviving piece of a wall this age, in the UK

=== Saxon period ===
Around 650 AD, St Birinus, the first Bishop of Dorchester (Oxford), sent his missionaries into Wessex. The small settlement that existed at the time on the headland now known as Hengistbury Head, proved unsuitable for the purpose of spreading the word of God because it was set back from and out of reach of the traders who used the busy port. Far more useful was a stretch of raised land between the two rivers of the Avon and Stour which carried people and their wares to and from settlements such as Blandford and Old Sarum (Salisbury). The site had other advantages in that it was raised and well drained, it could easily be defended being surrounded on three sides by water, it was close to the lowest crossing points of the two rivers, and there was a plentiful supply of drinking water both from the rivers and a number of wells in the area now known as Purewell. The town was originally called Twynam or Twyneham (which gives the town's central school its name), from "tweon eam", which meant (the settlement) between two rivers. Christchurch, listed as Twynham, has two entries in the Domesday Book, being part of the Edgegate Hundred, with 47 households.

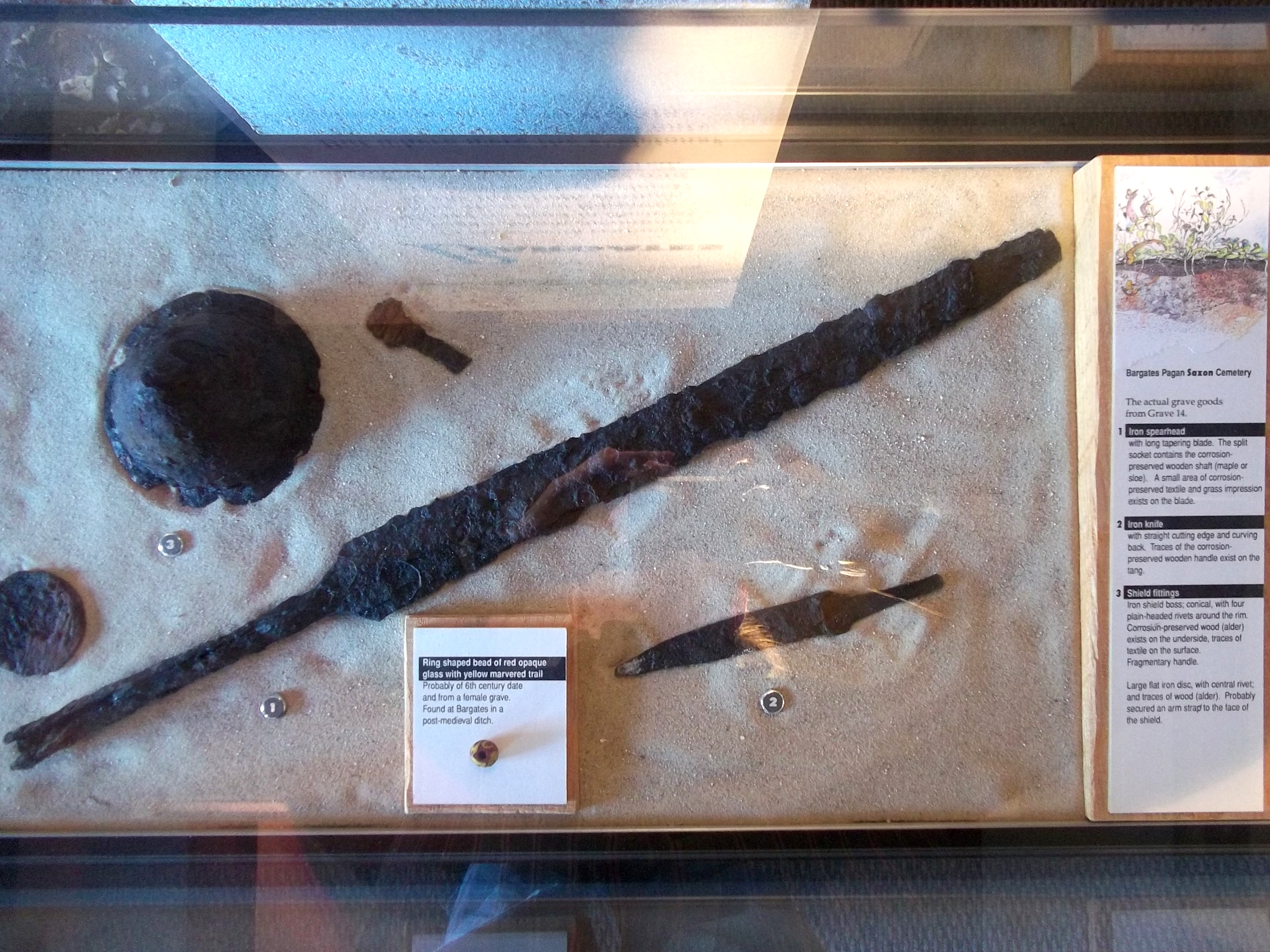
Anglo-Saxon grave goods (shield fittings, spearhead and knife) on display in the Red House Museum in Christchurch

Excavations conducted in 1977/8 in the Bargates area uncovered a pagan Anglo-Saxon cemetery of the 6th or 7th century containing the graves of 34 warriors of the Saxo-Jutish period. The graves yielded extensive finds of early Saxon metalwork, and indicated a previously unsuspected early Saxon presence in southeast Dorset.

During Saxon times the harbour was one of the most important in England as it was easily reached from the continent and boats could enter the harbour and travel up the river Avon all the way to Salisbury. Alfred the Great considered Twynham to be of such strategic importance that at the end of the 9th century, with the threat of invasion by the Danes, he made it a burgh (fortified town). The Anglo-Saxon Chronicle tells how in 901 AD, Aethelwold; a cousin of Alfred the Great, captured the town's ramparts. Although Aethelwold was eventually defeated, Edward the Elder made the decision to fortify the town further. Parts of the old Saxon town wall were discovered in the early 70s when considerable archaeological excavation was carried out. The wall was found to be of earth faced with stone and probably had a wooden fighting top and palisade. The gate stood at the north end of the town until it was removed in 1744. It was from the burgh's gate that Bargates, the then main road into the town, took its name.

=== The Priory church ===
In 1094 a chief minister of William II, Ranulf Flambard, then Dean of Twynham, began the building of a priory on the site of the original mission church. Local legend tells that Flambard originally intended the church to be built on top of nearby St. Catherines Hill but, during the night, all the building materials were mysteriously transported to the site of the present priory. This 'miracle' is cited as one of the reasons the town became known as Christchurch. On 28 November 1539, John Draper the last prior of Christchurch, surrendered the priory, and it was dissolved. The monastic buildings of the priory were pulled down soon after the dissolution. The King had intended to pull down the church as well as the monastic buildings, but in response to a plea from the townspeople, supported by Prior Draper, he granted the church together with the churchyard to the churchwardens and inhabitants of Christchurch to be used as the parish church in perpetuity on 23 October 1540, a grant that was confirmed on 12 February 1612 by James I. The town is fortunate that the Christchurch Priory cartulary, which consists of over 1,300 documents and charters copied and collated in the 14th century, with a few later additions, has survived to provide a comprehensive account of the Priory and events connected to it during the medieval period. A full translation was published in 2007. The evolution of the Priory into the building it is today took place over many centuries: The nave and transepts are Norman with heavy columns and round arches, whereas the lady chapel is from the 14th century and more Perpendicular in style. The great choir is even later, having been rebuilt in the 16th century. The Priory is noted for its Miraculous Beam, which attracts pilgrims from all over the world. From the reign of Edward I, after mass on Sundays, the church wardens supervised the archery practice that all men were obliged to undertake. This event took place on a piece of unconsecrated land between the north porch and transept. The requirement for the men of the town to practise archery continued until Tudor times.

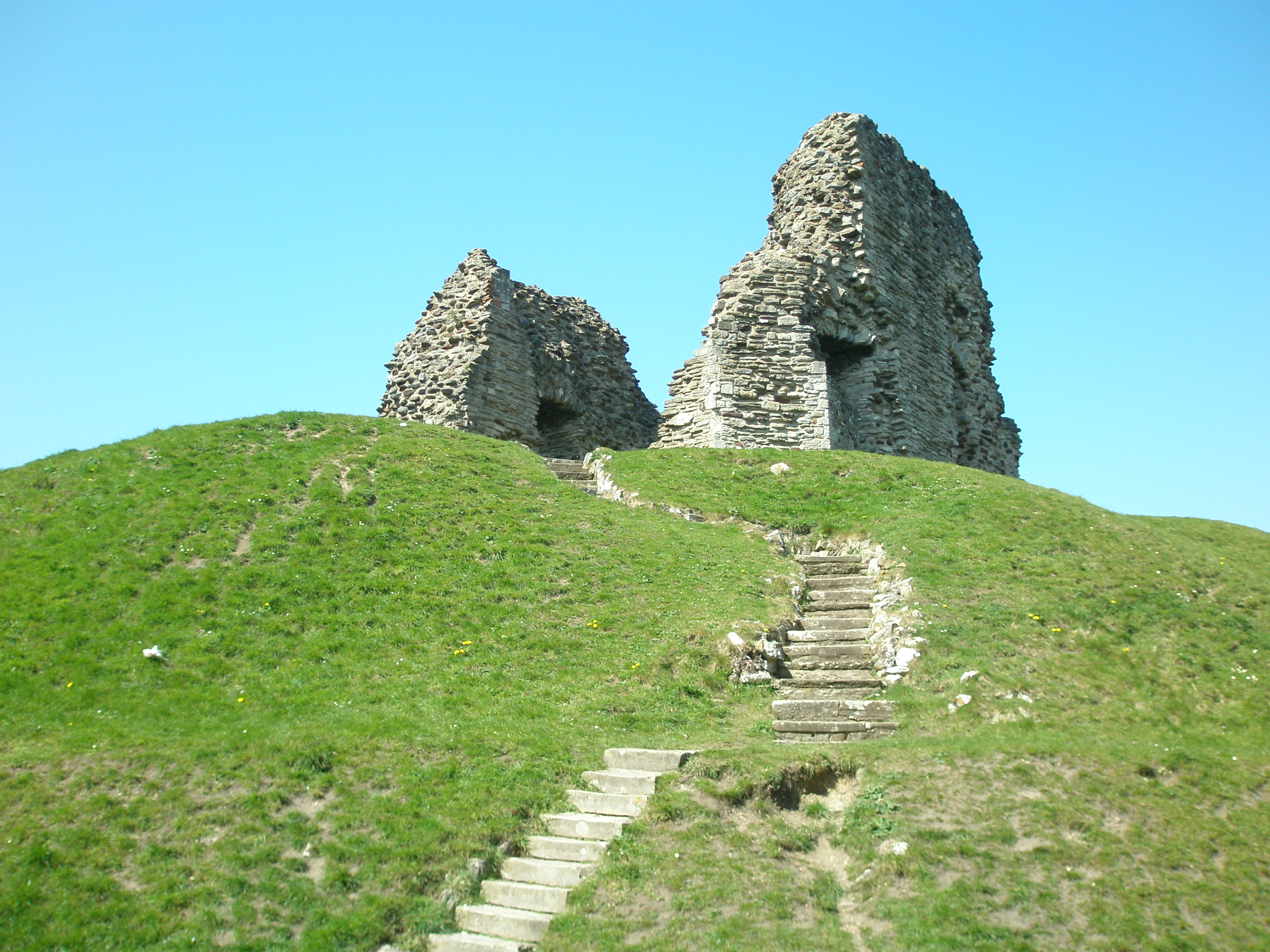
The keep on top of its steep motte.

=== The castle ===
At the start of the 12th century Christchurch became the caput of a feudal barony when it was granted by King Henry I (1100–1135) to Richard de Redvers (d.1107), feudal baron of Plympton, Devon. The castle was originally built as a wooden motte and bailey fort, and its placement seems to have caused the realignment of nearby streets.

After Richard's death the Manor of Christchurch passed to his son, Baldwin de Redvers (d.1155). Baldwin was one of the primary barons to support Empress Matilda, the daughter of King Henry I, in her claim for the crown against her cousin King Stephen (1135–1154) during The Anarchy. In about 1147, when the civil war was all but over, Baldwin went on a pilgrimage to Jerusalem or took part in the Second Crusade. It seems to have been at this time, when it was rumoured that he had died overseas, that King Stephen's former commander of Malmesbury, Walter de Pinkney, seized the opportunity to capture the castle at Christchurch. He then committed many atrocities locally and was finally ambushed by the townspeople in the nearby churchyard, where he was killed. The castle was briefly besieged and recaptured for Baldwin. It seems likely that the construction of a stone keep and the domestic hall now known as the Constable's House was instigated by Baldwin after his safe return to England.

The castle again saw action during the Civil War of 1642–51. The Parliamentarians were allowed to take control of the castle in 1644. The Royalists laid siege to it for 3 days, demolishing houses on the corner of Church Street and Castle Street in order to site their cannons. The Royalists were unable to take the castle and Cromwell fearing such a powerful stronghold, ordered it to be destroyed in 1652.

Today the bailey is home to a bowling green and gardens. The slighted keep still stands on top of its steep motte and now has steps for easier access. Much of the stone-built Constable's House, which was erected around 1160, also survives, having been excluded from Cromwell's order for destruction. Two of its notable features are a rare example of a Norman chimney and a garderobe tower situated over the adjacent millstream. It also has a small wharf and watergate which enabled direct access to the ground floor storeroom from the millstream. It is recorded that during his 17-year-reign, 1199–1216, King John visited the town on seven occasions. The purpose of these visits is not known but it is supposed that he may have been hunting in the nearby New Forest. It is likely that he stayed at the Constable's House as this would have been the only accommodation befitting a king in the town at the time.

=== The leper hospital ===
During the reign of Edward II, a leper hospital was established on land given to the Priory's monks by King Ethelred. The hospital accumulated additional lands through grants during the 14th century, by which time it was also caring for the terminally ill. After the dissolution of the monasteries, the hospital and its lands passed to the lord of the manor. When the Earl of Clarendon was impeached and left the country in 1667, control passed to the mayor and burgesses. and during this period, due to a decline in leprosy, the hospital's charter was extended so that all profits could be disposed of in a charitable fashion The charity's monies came from grants, the renting and leasing of lands and property, and from the collection of alms. In 1824 Benjamin Ferrey was appointed master of the trust and at this time some of the charities income was being used to provide bread for the town's poor. In 1835, 21 families were being provided with two 2 lb loaves a bread each week. The charity still exists today although the hospital is long gone, assisting around sixty residents a year as well as contributing to other charities such as the Citizen's Advice Bureau.

=== The English Civil War ===
In 1644 a force of some 2,000 Roundhead cavalry, under Sir William Waller, surprised Royalist troops who were billeted in and around the town. 100 horse and 400 foot soldiers were captured without resistance. Waller's men stabled their horses in the Great Choir of the Priory church and apparent evidence of their presence can be seen in the pews which show signs of having been chewed.

In September 1644, the cost of maintaining Hurst Castle fell on the Hundred of Christchurch and Waller was ordered to impress 1100 horses for the war effort. Although the horses were paid for, the loss would have affected local agriculture.

In 1645 the Roundheads, now under the command of Major Phillip Lower, were chased off by a large contingent of Royalist cavalry, under Lord Goring. Goring's force however was not strong enough to hold the town and so withdrew, allowing Lower's troops to return. A few days later Goring returned with a larger force of some 1000 men. Lower now only had 200 men but had made efforts to bolster the town's defences and had pulled down some of the buildings to increase the field of fire from his guns. Despite this the Royalists were able to occupy the town, driving the defenders back into the castle and the church. As Goring lacked the large calibre weapons required to destroy the two structures, the attackers settled down to a siege. A few days later however, news reached Goring that Parliamentarian reinforcements were on their way from Lymington and having already suffered heavy losses, he made the decision to withdraw.

Christchurch remained in Parliamentarian hands until the end of the war and Major Lower was made a Lieutenant Colonel and Governor of Winchester. In 1650 the castle's cannons were removed and the keep slighted. The walls of the bailey were also pulled down and used to fill the ditch. The battle for Christchurch must've been of some magnitude as much shot, cannonballs and weaponry were later retrieved from the millstream.

== 18th and 19th centuries ==
=== Harbour ===
Until circa 1735, boats of up to 25 tons were able to travel up the Avon as far as Salisbury and indeed, in 1535, Henry VIII had ordered the removal of all fish weirs as they impeded navigation. The most difficult part of the journey was gaining entrance to the harbour with its constantly shifting sandbars. In 1665 Edward Hyde, Earl of Clarendon, bought the Lordship of the Manor of Christchurch. As part of his plans to improve trade in the town, he decide to resolve the problems with the entrance to the harbour by cutting a new one through the sandspit at the foot of Hengistbury Head. He commissioned a report which outlined the advantages of doing so, which also suggested that 5th and 6th rate ships could be built there with wood from the New Forest and armed with guns cast from the ironstone doggers which lay in great piles nearby. The building of a fort on the headland, the report concluded, would make the anchorage 'almost impregnable'. In addition an act was proposed to dredge the Avon to make it navigable for larger vessels but this came to nothing. Despite this, Hyde started work on the new entrance, laying down a line of ironstone doggers. These doggers, now known as Clarendon's Rocks, can still be seen at low tide. The new entrance however was continually silting up and in 1703 a large storm hit, damaging the groyne and filling up the new entrance. This appears to have been the last straw and the attempt was abandoned. Over the following 150 years many alternative schemes were put forward but none of them were taken up.

A lifeboat station was opened at Christchurch in 1804. It was managed by a local committee but was closed at an unknown date before 1850. The Royal National Lifeboat Institution opened a lifeboat station at Poole in 1865 and another at Mudeford in 1963.

=== The Battle of Mudeford ===
The sheltered harbour and easy access to neighbouring towns made the area popular with smugglers, culminating in "The Battle of Mudeford" in 1784 between Customs and Excise and the smugglers. In July of that year the greatest volume of contraband ever managed in a single run was landed at the Haven in Mudeford. 300 men, 100 carts and 400 horses were involved and the cargo included 6,000 casks of spirits and 30 tons of tea. The operation was watched by the crew of a revenue cutter, who were outnumbered and powerless to intervene. Reinforcements arrived in the shape of a second custom cutter and a Royal Navy Sloop (HMS Orestes); and the three vessels converged on the harbour. A lengthy fire fight ensued in which a Royal Navy Officer, William Allen, was killed. The smugglers escaped with their cargo but lost their ships which were captured. A manhunt was instigated and three men were eventually arrested. One, George Coombes was tried and executed for Allen's murder. The owner of the vessels, John Streeter, was sent to Winchester gaol but managed to escape and flee to the Channel Islands. He returned under amnesty during the Napoleonic Wars.

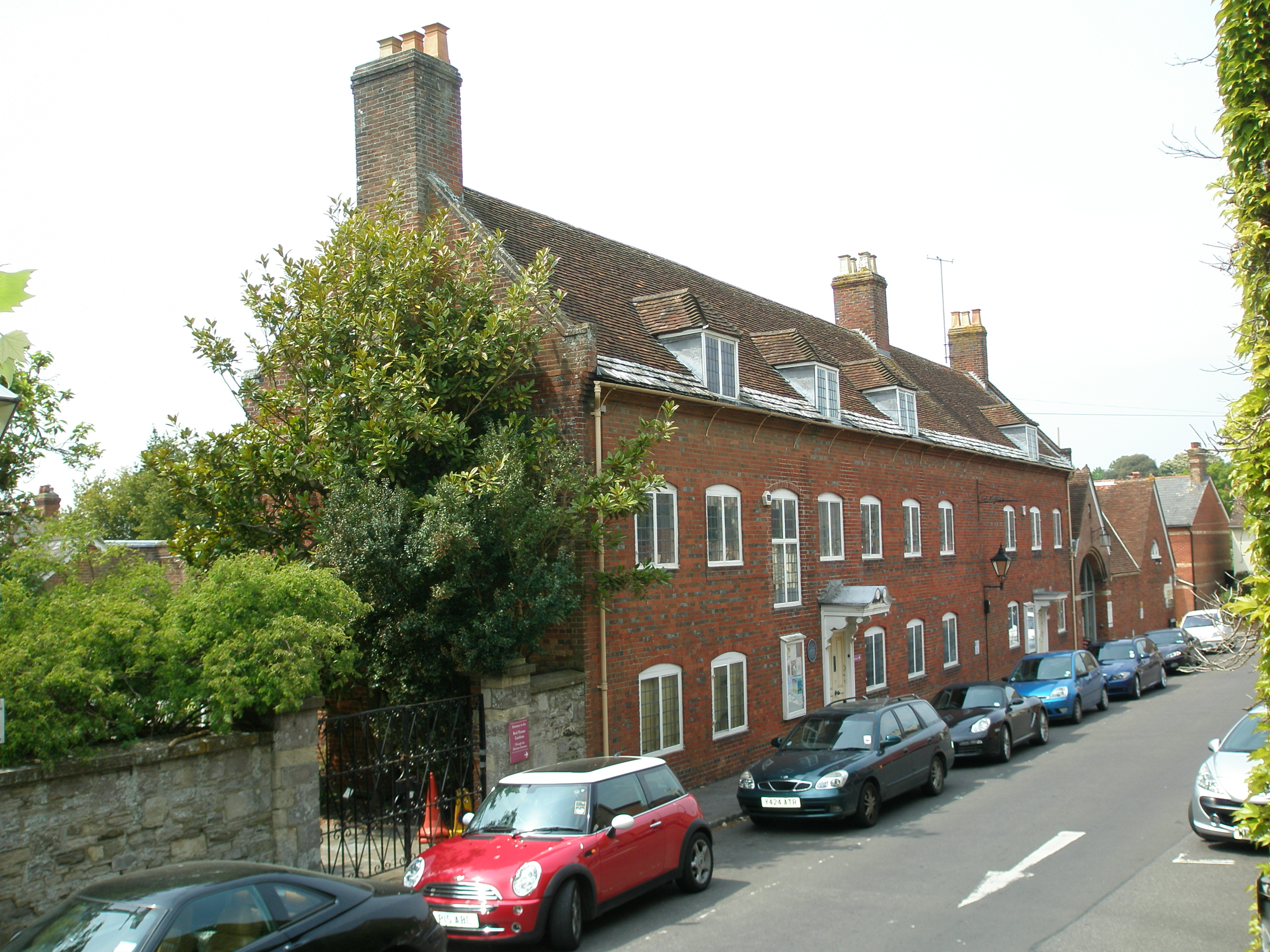
The old town workhouse in Quay Road. Now the Red House Museum.

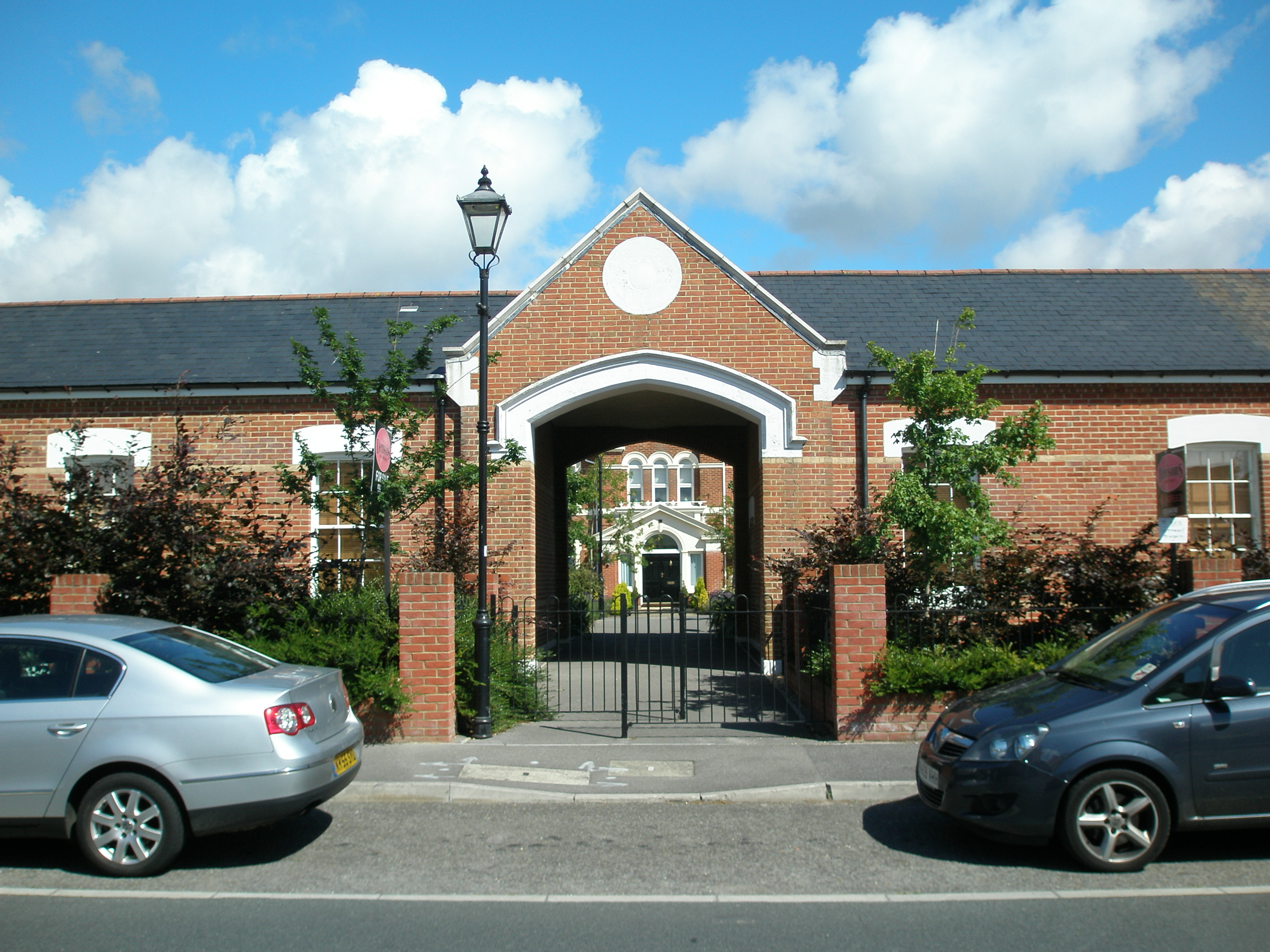
The entrance to what was the Bournemouth Union Workhouse. Converted to flats in 1995.

=== Workhouses and poor relief ===
The workhouse system began to evolve in the 17th century as a way for parishes to reduce the cost to ratepayers of providing poor relief. The Workhouse Test Act 1722 was introduced to prevent irresponsible claims on a parish's poor rate. Anyone seeking poor relief could be obliged to enter a workhouse and undertake a set amount of work, usually for no pay, a system known as indoor relief. Many parishes established workhouses during the 18th century, and Christchurch was no exception, the first one being built in Quay Road in 1768. When the workhouse moved to bigger premises in Fairmile in 1881, the property in Quay Road was purchased by the Druitts, a family of wealthy solicitors with a keen interest in history. The Druitt family turned the old workhouse into a museum which was bequeathed to the town. It opened as The Redhouse Museum in 1951. The Druitt family also left a property in the High Street to be used as a library together with all the books and papers they had collected and extensive gardens. James Druitt (five times mayor 1850, 1859, 1867, 1888, 1896) was instrumental in putting a stop to the ironstone mining at Hengistbury Head (see below). The second workhouse in Fairmile became Christchurch Hospital in 1948 after the Welfare State was introduced. A large proportion of the site was turned into housing in 1995.

=== Schooling ===
The first half of the 19th century saw the introduction of the first state schools in Christchurch. The earliest school in the town was founded around c.1140 but this disappeared with the dissolution of the monasteries. Later a free school was established in St. Michael's Loft in the Priory. In 1662 this became a grammar school and then in 1828 it became a private academy under control of the vicar. It closed in 1869 when schooling became more widely available through the National Schools. There were also a number of private and boarding schools for those who could afford the fees such as Christchurch School in Purewell which was established in 1827. It described itself as "an upper middle class, modern school", and was run by Josiah Evans. The first National School opened in the High Street in 1829 on land given to the mayor and burgesses by Sir George Henry Rose. There were 354 pupils noted in a report of 1831. These buildings were sold to James Druitt in 1866 and the new school was built in Wick Lane by which time there were 490 pupils in attendance. Another school established around the same time was an independent school attached to the Congregational Church in Millhams Street. This was enlarged in 1880 to take 400 pupils. It closed in 1926 when Clarendon Road Junior School opened. A new technical school was inaugurated in 1898. Classes were held in various buildings throughout the town until additions to the Town Hall in 1903 provided classrooms. Book keeping, maths, languages, wood carving, science, needlework and art were taught there. In 1930 Twynham School was built. It remained the town's only secondary school until Highcliffe opened in 1963.

=== Transport ===
The railway came to Christchurch in 1847 although the nearest station, Christchurch Road, was at Holmsley (now the tea rooms) and passengers were taken the rest of the way by omnibus. A station was built in the town, close to the existing one, in 1862 and was served by a branch line from Ringwood. Christchurch joined the mainline in 1883 and a new station was built. The branch line to Ringwood remained open until 1935. The arrival of the railways affected maritime trade. As the century passed, more and more imports came by rail and less by sea. By 1906 the trade had all but finished. In 1908 Christchurch Council rebuilt and re-fendered the Town Quay which then became the centre for the many pleasure boat companies that had grown to serve the tourist trade. The last trade vessel to leave the Town Quay was a 60-ton Thames barge called Gerald which came to collect gravel on 12 July 1938. Mudeford however remains a working quay to this day.

=== Other improvements ===
A gas works was built in 1853, and gas started to take over from oil as the principal form of street lighting. It was not until 1930 that electric took over, even though The Bournemouth and Poole Electricity Company had opened a power station in the town in 1903.

In 1873, following the Inclosure Act 1845 (8 & 9 Vict. c. 118), over 300 acres of common land were enclosed. This area to the north of the town stretched from east to west as far as the Avon and Stour respectively, and thus prevented expansion. Following the enclosure of the Portfield, as it was then known, there was a substantial increase in population. Between 1871 and 1891, the population of the town increased by around 225% to almost 15,000. The second of the town's workhouses, which later became the hospital; the Drill Hall, both of the Clarendon Road schools and a police station were all built on the old Portfield but most was given over to housing. Today all that remains of the Portfield is the town's recreation ground, an area of about 10 acres, but the name lives on through Portfield Hall, Road, Close and School.

== 20th century ==
=== Services and transport ===
Work started on the town's sewerage system in 1902. Prior to this date, the drinking water was often contaminated spreading smallpox, cholera and a host of other diseases. Beer became the most popular drink and brewing became big business. It is recorded that Christchurch had 6 Breweries, 16 inns and 26 Alehouses in 1855, a time when the local population was less than 4,000.

A power station was built in 1903 to power the public trams. Using coal, brought to the town quay by local businessman Samuel Bemister, and water from the nearby River Avon; the power station produced 500 volts DC and although the boilers were shut down at night, the excess generated was sufficient to light the town. In 1940 it was added to the national grid. Today the power station is a museum and a grade II listed building. It is one of the most complete buildings of its kind. Trams ran from 1905 to 1936 when they were replaced by trolleybuses. The last trolleybus ran in 1969. Tuckton Bridge, first opened in 1883 as a wooden structure, had to be rebuilt in 1905 to take the weight of the trams, and the, then main route out of the town was widened through wide scale demolition on the west side; although many of these buildings were rebuilt further back.

In 1926 Surrey Flying Services started to offer five-shilling flights from fields close to Somerford Road (then called Street Lane). In 1930 Francis F. Fisher rented another field towards the eastern end of Somerford Road and by 1933 the Fisher Aviation Company had flown over 19,000 passengers. In the same year, Sir Alan Cobham's Air Circus put on a show there attended by around 8,000 spectators. In 1934 Fisher obtained permission to establish an aerodrome on the site. On 9 March 1944 the airfield was taken over by 405 fighter group, 9th USAAF. In 1954 the runway was rebuilt to take heavier craft. This was done by MEXE (Christchurch) using a technique developed there of mixing concrete with the existing soil. Between 1962 (when De Havilland closed) and 1966, the airfield fell into disuse. Today the area is a mixture of housing and industrial estates.

In August 1941, another aerodrome opened at Hurn. During the war it was home to a range of aircraft, including Spitfires, Wellingtons and Typhoons. By late 1942 it had become a base for a number of American squadrons. Towards the end of the war, the airport was transferred to the Ministry of Civil Aviation, and, for a couple of years became the UK's only intercontinental airport (until the opening of Heathrow Airport). Bournemouth Airport as it became known was within the Borough of Christchurch's boundaries.

The last 100 years has seen much development in the town with a big increase in housing. One such development, which had a huge impact, was the construction of the bypass in 1958, prior to which the High Street was the main thoroughfare to and from London and Southampton. The main road in and out of the town, previously Bargates, changed when Barrack Road was widened to four lanes in 1960. An alternative scheme put forward at the time involved demolishing the whole of the East side of the High Street to create a 60' wide carriageway.

=== World War II ===
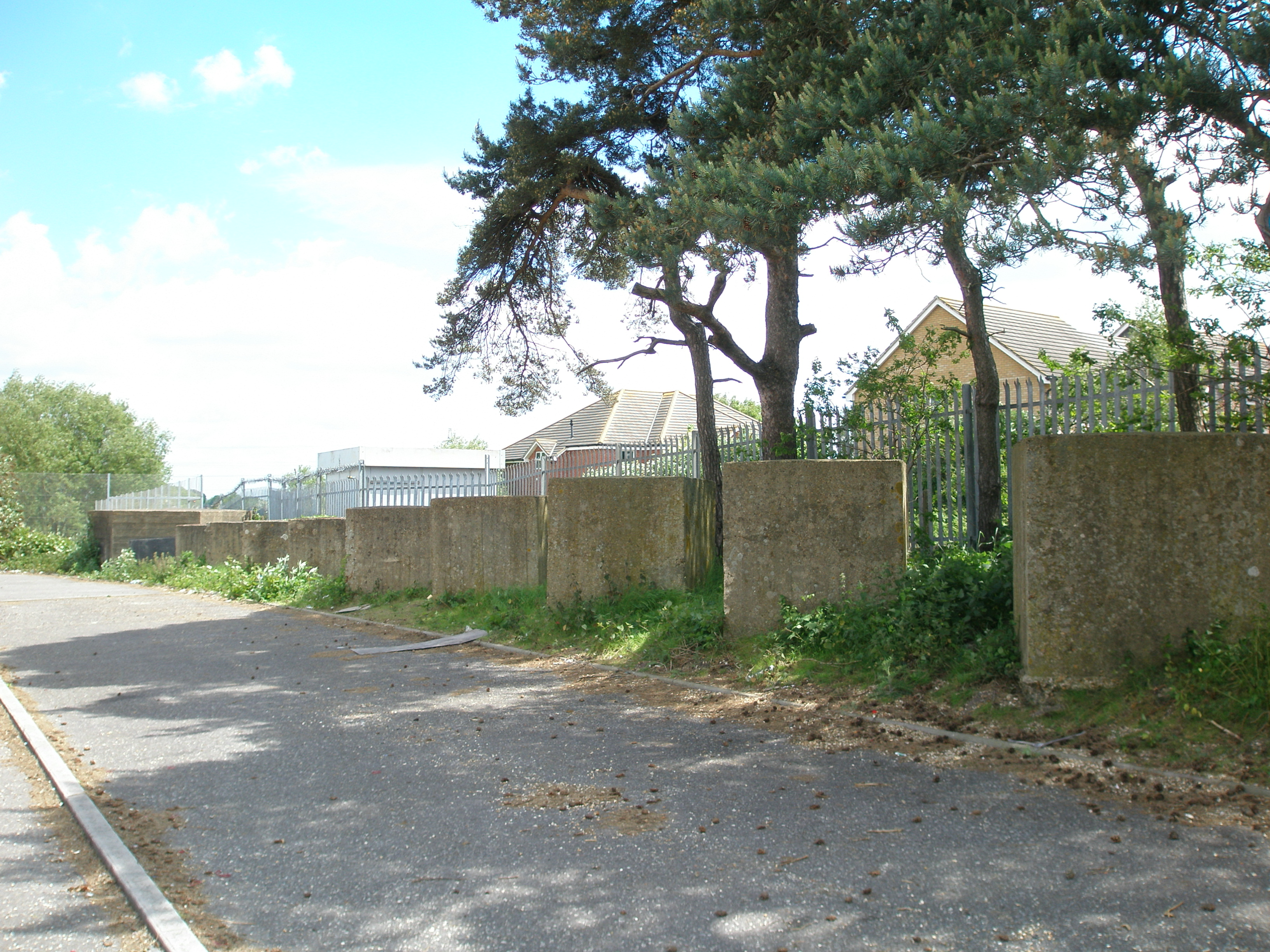
Part of the anti-tank defence which ran the length of the railway line between the River Stour and the River Avon.

During the Second World War Christchurch was again fortified against an expected invasion. The construction of pillboxes, gun emplacements and tank traps in and around the town, made Christchurch an 'anti-tank island'. The idea was that an invasion by the German 6th Army from Cherbourg would be unable to link up east to west so long as the town was able to hold out.

A line of tank traps and two pillboxes were constructed to the north of the town between the two rivers; and pillboxes were built on islands near the town bridge, covering the Avon and near Tuckton bridge covering the Stour. The entrance to the harbour was covered by two pillboxes; one at the end of the quay and another much larger one at Sandhills that also covered the beach which was mined and protected with barbed wire. The roads leading to the beach were blocked with more anti-tank devices. The eastern approaches to the town and the railway line were also guarded with pillboxes; one at the Ringwood Road rail bridge and the other at Roeshot Hill. The latter being built into the bridge.

In advance of the northern line of defences, stood a lone, brick-built pillbox which would have been manned by the local home guard; 7th Battalion, Hampshire Regiment. A number of pillboxes were also built to protect the airfield. Some of these defences are still standing today including pillboxes at Tuckton Bridge, Roeshot Hill and Mudeford Wood; and part of the anti-tank 'hedgehog' defence, which has been designated an ancient monument.

=== Archaeology ===
Many archaeological digs have occurred in and around the town. Between 1971 and 1973 this was mainly concerned with tracing the course of the town's ramparts and during this period much ironstone tumble was found, and the existence of a wattle pallisade was confirmed. When the buildings around the trolley bus terminal were demolished in 1974 the site was excavated. The remains of mediaeval buildings, cesspits and latrines were discovered, including a wall and a flagstone entrance. A number of mediaeval arrowheads were also found.

When a supermarket and new car park were built on the north side of the bypass in 1977, another wave of archaeological digging took place which revealed two Bronze Age barrows and a 6th-century Saxon graveyard containing 34 graves. Some of the finds of spears, shield bosses and knives can be seen on display in the Red House Museum.

In August 2002 a detailed and comprehensive geophysical survey of the motte and bailey was carried out and an application was made to English Heritage to carry out small-scale excavations of the site. Although permission has yet to be granted for excavation, in September 2005 permission was obtained to a carry out a limited coring exercise around the base of the motte. Prior to work being carried out on the King's Arms in 2006, an evaluation trench was excavated in the hotel car park. The majority of this site was estimated as outside the burgh wall and likely area of settlement. No remains from the town walls nor any notable artefacts were discovered. However, it was found that the ground had at some time been built up by 2M, and filled a former meandering stream, as a precursor to the now canalised mill stream.

== Industrial history ==
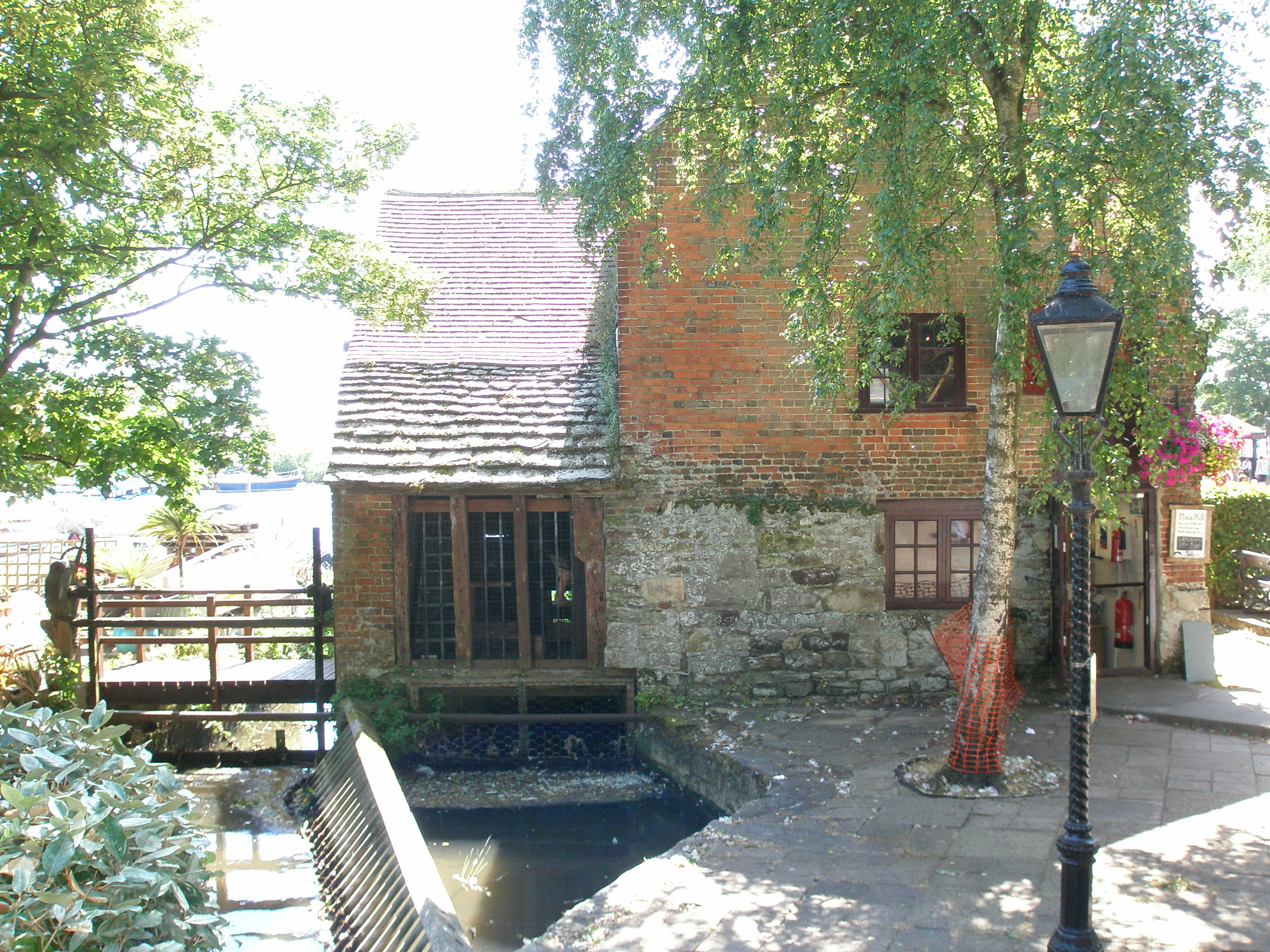
An Anglo-Saxon watermill near the Town Quay.

For many years now, tourism has been the mainstay of the economy in the town, generating over £76,000,000 p.a. The borough had been enjoying a modest trade in tourists since George III visited in the 1790s but the number of visitors increased after the arrival of the railways in the early 1860s. Improvements in trains and motor coaches and a general increase in the standard of living meant that by 1914 Christchurch was a well-established holiday destination. The development of Bournemouth also generated a great deal of traffic bound for Christchurch; although the town remained a resort in its own right. The number of visitors increased during the 20s and in the late 50s a holiday camp was built on the quay. In 1961 it became a "Pontin's" which in turn shut down and now is housing and a riverside hotel. Farms, factories and boat yards have since been replaced with housing but Christchurch was once an important trading port and prospered due to its industry and manufacturing.

Fishing and agriculture have always played a part in the local economy and Christchurch still retains a small commercial fleet to this day. Some of the catch of fish, lobster, crabs and molluscs end up on the stall at Mudeford Quay. During the season the Run is netted for salmon. Christchurch was at one time renowned for its salmon and the weather vane atop of the Priory alludes to this. The fishing industry has however declined and much farmland has given way to housing. Wick Lane Farm, Latch Farm, Purewell Farm, Mudeford Farm, Dudsbury Farm, Newman's Farm, Grove Farm and Stanpit Farm have all disappeared since the second world war. Many farms still exist on the outskirts of the town but even so most have lost some land to redevelopment.

In 1568 Christchurch was famous for the manufacture of frieze cloth; a coarse woolen cloth with the nap on one side only, which was used mainly for overcoats. The nap was raised by water driven drums of teasels and it is thought that Knapp Mill, on the Avon, played a part in the production. Knapp Mill, mentioned in the Domesday book, was originally a corn mill which was converted for fulling. In 1760 it burnt down and was rebuilt as a corn mill once more. In 1895 ownership passed to the West Hants Water Company who again rebuilt it. It is now the pumping station.

=== Boatbuilding ===
Boat building is another industry with a long history in Christchurch and indeed George Holloway (below) started his career building boats on Mudeford Spit. Some of the boatyards have gone, notably Tom Lack's Catalac Catamarans, liquidated in 1986, and Robert Ives which moved to New Milton around 1982 but many boat yards are still trading including: Elkins, Strides and Purbrook-Rossiter who have been building yachts and dinghies on the banks of the Avon since 1938. Not forgetting Bob Hoare who built Olympic gold medal winning dinghies in his own back garden. Elkins built a large number of yachts including the Laurent Giles designed Vertues. When the demand for wooden boats fell, moulds for glassfibre boats were built there. Between 1976 and 1981, Fletcher Sports Boats constructed fast power boats and Evolution class yachts at the same site. In 1929 a boat was built with an innovative propulsion system, precipitated by the lack of depth in the harbour. In order to operate in shallow water it is essential to have protected screws which protrude a minimum distance below the hull. The Hotchkiss Propulsion System provided a new approach to the problem whereby water was drawn in through an intake and forced through an outlet in the stern; internal, rotating cones providing the motive power. This cone propulsion is, in a developed form, still in use today. Many of the boats built for use in the harbour were constructed with a slipper stern, a stern which slopes the 'wrong way' so the boat is longer on the waterline than above. This design helps to minimise the disturbance caused by the screw and helps reduce wash. During WWII, the boatyard that was later to become Elkins, was pressed into service by the Admiralty. It produced over 200 specialised craft including 25' motor cutters and 72' landing craft. Purbrook-Rossiter also stopped their normal activities during this time to produce whalers and lifeboats. The beginning of the depression at the end of the 1980s left only a few boatbuilders trading from over 200 years of documented boatbuilding.

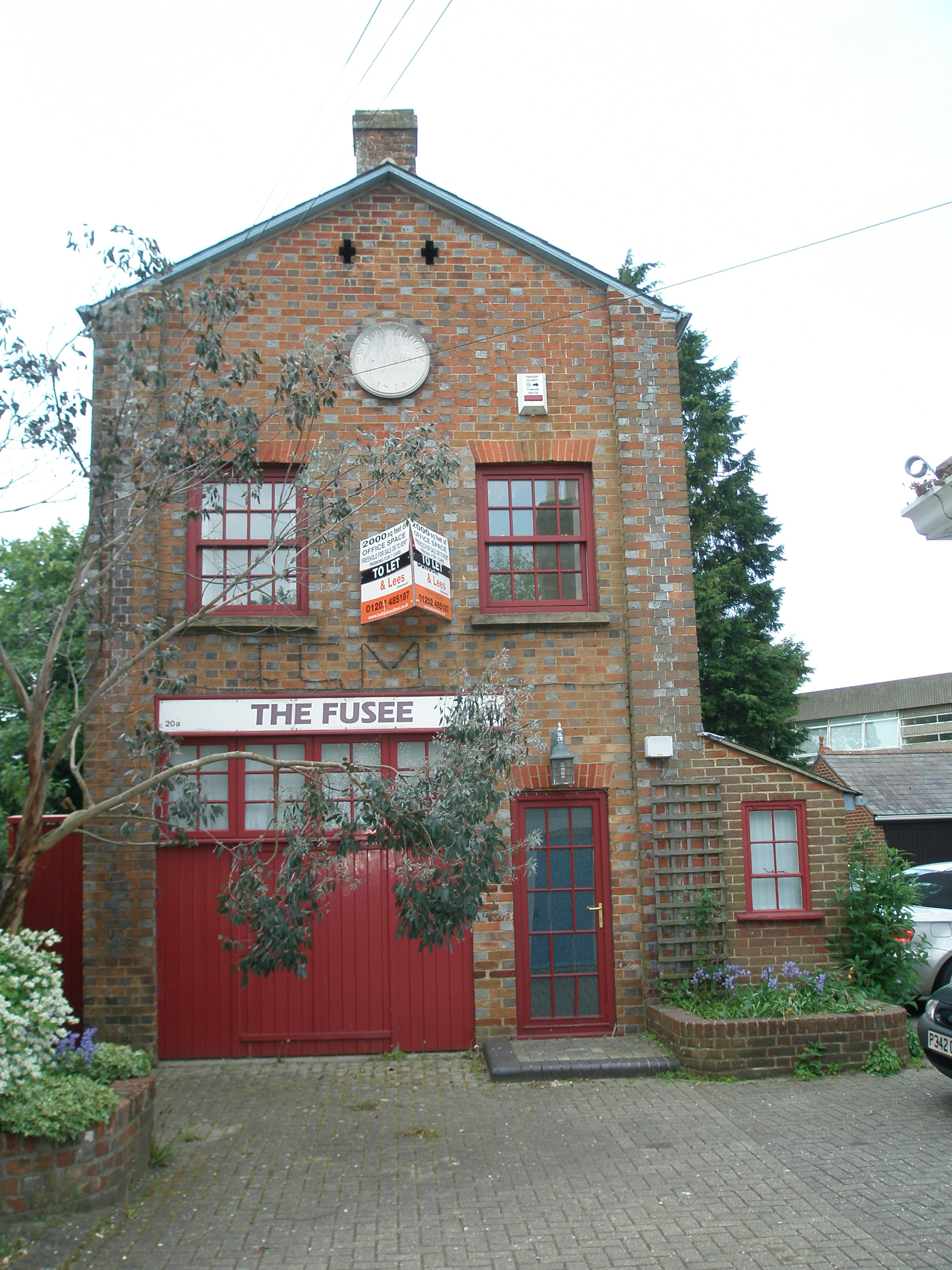
William Hart's factory today. The building was deliberately narrow with large windows on either side to provide the maximum amount of natural light.

=== The fusee chain industry ===
In 1790, Robert Cox started manufacturing fusee chains from workshops in the High Street, for use in the gearing mechanism of watches. The work was extremely intricate; the chains were only fourteen-hundredths of an inch thick, therefore children as young as nine, from the local workhouse (now the Red House Museum) were employed in their manufacture. The children were paid 1s 6d for a 70-hour week and from 1802 were being taught to read for 10 minutes each morning and afternoon.

The manufacture of the chains involved several processes: The figure of eight links were punched from a sheet of steel and assembled three deep with the centre link overlapping the two outer, like a bicycle chain. The links were held together with rivets cut from steel wire and hooks punched from sheet metal were attached to either end. The entire chain was filed smooth, burnished and tempered in hot oil. Because the work was so fine, the chains were often thinner than a piece of cotton thread, a magnifying instrument was required. In addition it was common practice to place a glass globe filled with water in front of a candle and a mirror behind to increase the light. By 1793 Robert Cox had a monopoly on chain production in Britain, supplying watch, clock and chronometer makers throughout the country. Production flourished and in 1845 William Hart opened a similar factory in Bargates. It was built to an advanced design with particularly large windows on either side. 74' long but only 18' wide, it allowed the maximum amount of natural light to enter.

During the industry's height there were three fusee factories in the town and a large cottage industry. By 1855 there were more than 500 people making the chains in their own homes. Then in 1875, because of changes in watch design, the chains were no longer required, and the factories were closed. Hart was originally a taxidermist who built up a large collection of stuffed animals, many of which are now housed in the Red House Museum; and his factory which still stands today is a grade II listed building.

=== Smuggling ===
For many years smuggling was one of Christchurch's most lucrative 'industries' and many of the townspeople were involved. Local legends are rife and include such upstanding characters as doctors, parsons, bankers and local merchants. Even the mayor was involved, both John Cook and Samuel Hookey were known smugglers who became mayors. John Cook was mayor of Christchurch five times (1777, 1779, 1781, 1783, 1786). One notorious smuggler, Sophie Dawes later became a French Baroness.

Christchurch was popular with smugglers for a number of reasons: Firstly, the only land approaches to the town were across two bridges, and one of these was frequently out of use. The other could easily be blocked, perhaps by a herd of sheep or a heavy cart, giving the smugglers time for a leisurely escape. Secondly, it was close to the Cotentin Peninsula but not so close that a boat placed mid channel could observe both coasts. In good weather the coast of France is visible from the Kent coast but a vessel crossing to and from Dorset would be out of site for almost half the journey, and would therefore be able to claim it had come from another port or had been involved in the business of fishing. The beaches around Christchurch were sandy and gently sloping so boats could be run ashore without fear of damage. Although remote from its neighbours, cut off by heathland and forest, the roads inland were good; added to which the two rivers provided alternative routes for contraband, at a time when transport by water was faster and cheaper than overland movement of goods. Finally, there was the harbour itself. The entrance to which is a narrow channel, the Run, which was negotiable only with extreme care. Entering the harbour was made even more difficult by sandbanks that could shift overnight. To the smugglers, most of whom were professional and experienced seamen the harbour entrance was an open gate. But to the less skilled sailors on the revenue cutters, who had no local knowledge, the Run acted as 'a barrier that they feared to pass'.

Another notable female smuggler was Hannah Seller, one time landlady of the Ship in Distress, who has a channel in the harbour named after her (Mother Sillar's Channel). This channel, now silted up, used to lead to the back of her pub and thus was a convenient 'trade' route. Next door to the pub was a tobacco and snuff factory, owned by the by then 'respectable' John Streeter who had earlier been gaoled for his part in the Battle of Mudeford. Perhaps not unsurprisingly, many of the deliveries came at night and other local tobacco traders complained that they were unable to compete with Streeter.

Smuggling was such big business during the 18th and 19th centuries that large quantities of wealth were invested and accumulated. Much of it was left to the poor in the form of charitable gifts. One 'seafaring man', Ellis Coffin left a house and a shop (now Lloyds bank) to the town on the understanding that the income derived from it should be distributed amongst the poor.

=== Iron ore mining ===
George Holloway was already a successful businessman, having already established himself as a boat builder and merchant/trader, when in 1847 he applied for permission to remove the ironstone doggers at the foot of Hengistbury Head. Holloway owned a small fleet of windjammers that were engaged in the business of bringing coal from Southampton to the town quay. He required something as ballast for the return journey and saw that there was a good profit to be made from shipping the ironstone.

By 1852 he had removed all the loose doggers and had begun digging into the base of the cliffs. So profitable was this business that Holloway cut a channel between the harbour and the foot of the cliffs where he was mining, so that he was able to bring his ships closer and speed up the process. This channel is still visible today as are the ponds he built to provide water for his cart horses. Between 1856 and 1864, 52,650 tons of ironstone were removed and 13,000 tons in one year alone.

The damage George Holloway was doing to the Head and the coastline became apparent and local opposition grew. There was also some dispute as to whether he had violated the terms of his lease. Even so, by the time he was stopped in 1867, a third of the Head had been removed or lost through increased erosion and his mine had almost cut through to the sea beyond. Removal of the ironstone doggers on the sea side of the Head caused the Spit at the Harbour entrance to grow in length, extending to Steamer point by 1890. A long groyne had to be constructed to take the place of the missing doggers and check the erosion. In 1930, after Christchurch Council had refused to meet the asking price, Hengistbury Head (then in private ownership) was sold to Bournemouth for £25,000.

=== Ministry of Defence and the electronics industry ===
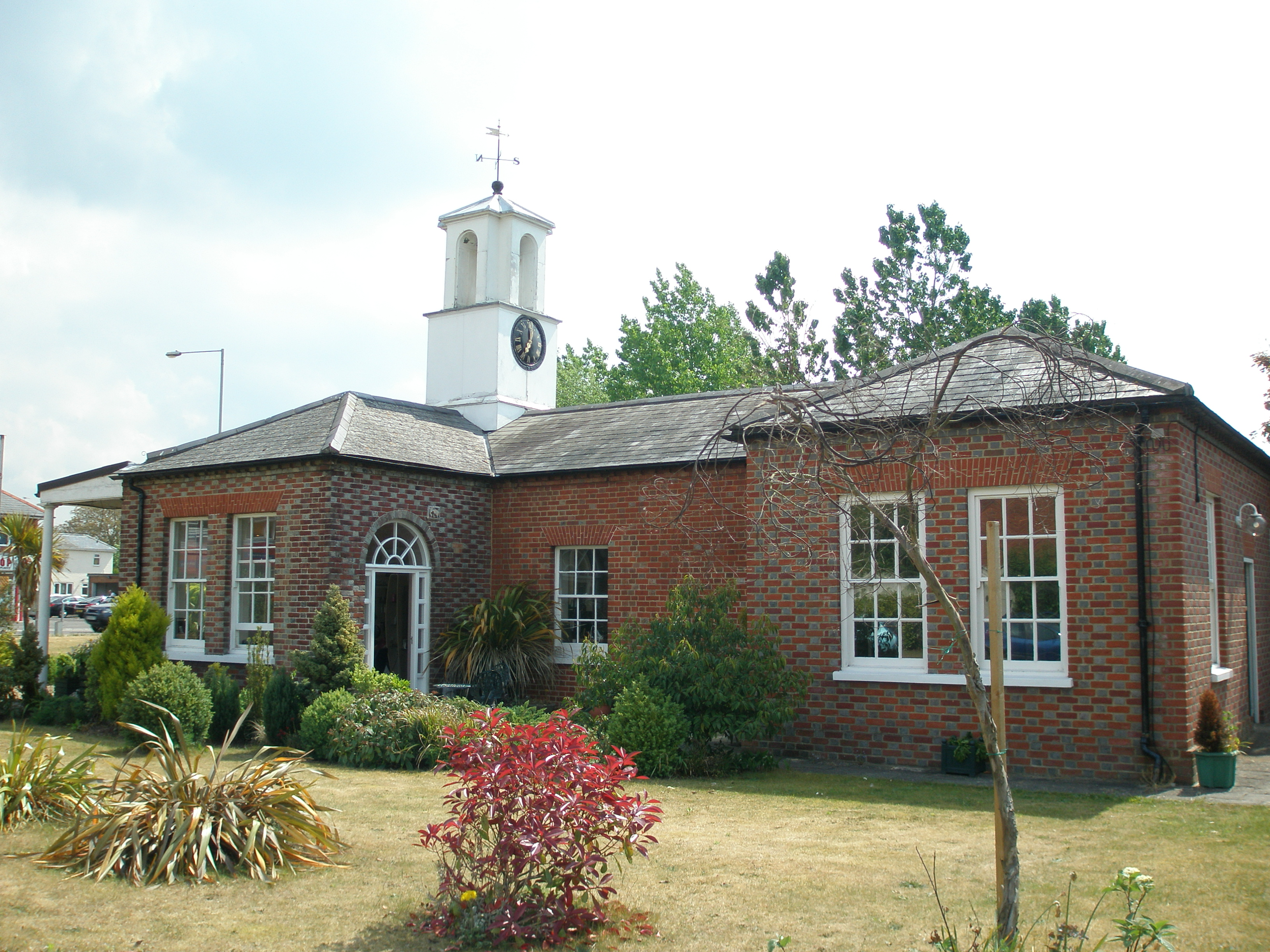
Christchurch Barracks Guard House built in 1811. Now a Bike, Skate and Paddleboard shop.

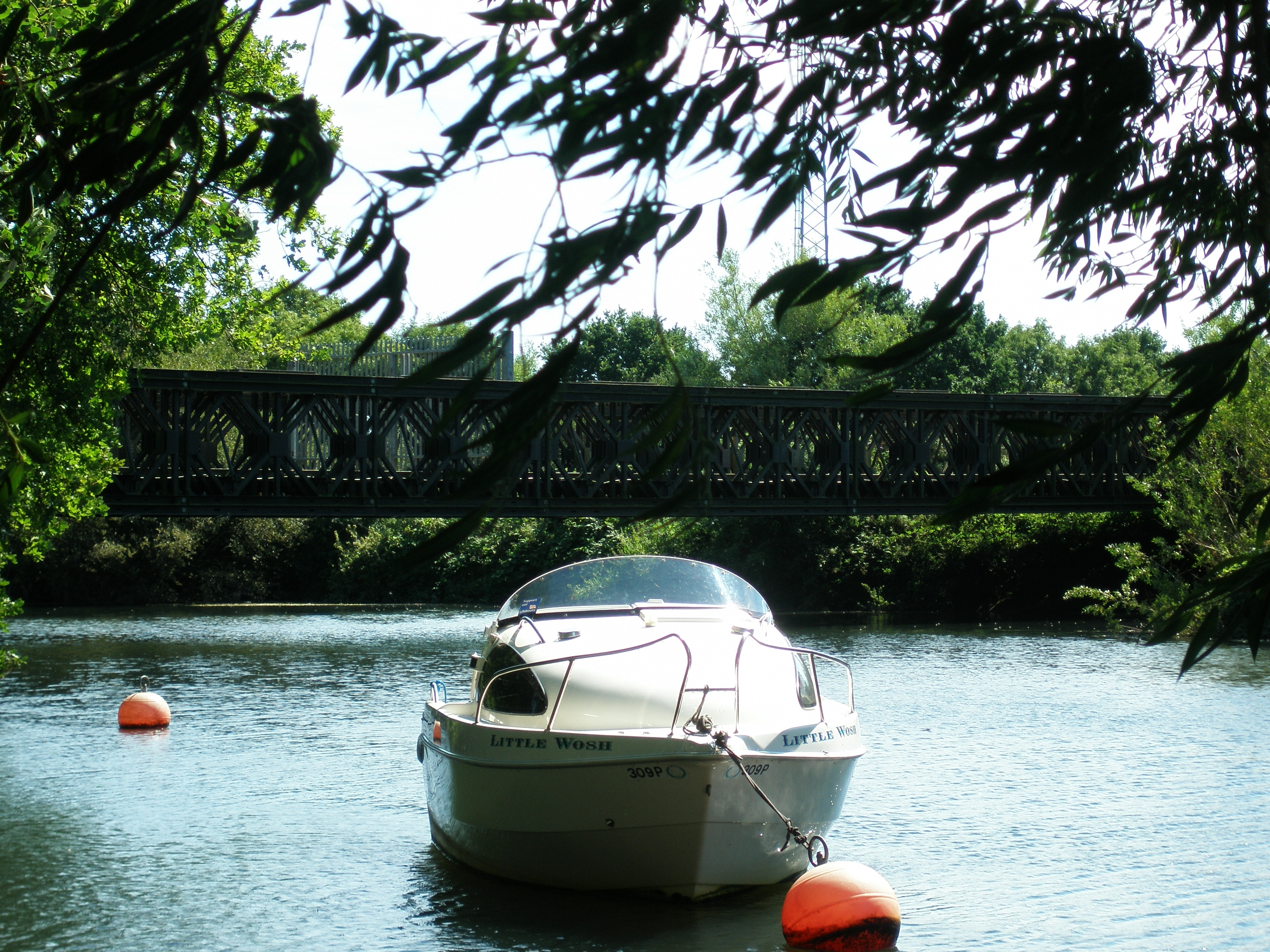
Bailey Bridge over the Stour, at the rear of what was once the barracks where it was invented and manufactured.

Christchurch has had a long relationship with the military and Ministry of Defence. The Barracks were built by Lord Tregonwell in 1794 to house troops to defend the south coast from the threat of invasion by France. Once this threat had passed, it was used by mounted troops who patrolled the nearby coastline in an attempt to combat smuggling. Parts of the original barracks still exist including the guard house, the stable block and the officer's mess. The Barracks later (1919) became the Military Experimental Engineering Establishment (originally the Experimental Bridging Company of Royal Engineers) where Sir Donald Bailey designed and built his famous bridge. A measure of the success of the Bailey Bridge can be made from its production figures. Between 1942 and 1945, over 490,000 tons of Bailey Bridge were produced. It is estimated that if all the panels produced during World War II were put together they would reach from Christchurch to Leningrad. In 1970 Military Experimental Establishment (MEXE) merged with the Fighting Vehicles Research and Development Establishment (FVRDE) at Chertsey to form the Military Vehicles Experimental Establishment (MVEE) which closed in the 1994. The site became a housing estate and retail park in 1997.

Between 1948 and 1980, Signals Research and Development Establishment (SRDE) were based in Christchurch on the airfield and at Friars Cliff. Two giant 'radomes' were constructed at Steamer Point to house satellite tracking equipment. When a number of MOD establishments merged in 1979, SRDE became the Royal Signals and Radar Establishment (RSRE). A year later RSRE relocated and the site was leased to Plessey Defence Systems who built (amongst other things) the widely used Ptarmigan radio. British Aerospace now share the site with the Spectrum Group.

In 1940 HM Government built a factory in the corner of Christchurch airfield. It was occupied by Airspeed until 1948 when De Havilland took it over. The Horsa, Ambassador, Mosquito, Vampire, Sea Vampire, Sea Venom and Sea Vixen were all manufactured here and in addition a number of Spitfires were converted into Seafires. By 1954, over 2000 people were working there. The factory closed in 1962, part of it is still owned by the Crown who use it for storage of documents. In 1963, the other part became Shand Kydd, the famous wallpaper company established in London in 1891. Shand Kydd closed in 1980 when the premises were taken over by Revo Castors. The last Sea Vixen manufactured at the Christchurch site stood for many years at the entrance to the Airfield Industrial Estate close to where it was built. It was eventually removed because of vandalism and taken to the aviation museum at RAF Tangmere where it was restored.

Cecil Gardner had already made a name for himself manufacturing radio sets, recharging accumulators and ac/dc transformers from a small factory in Southbourne when in 1939 he moved into a purpose-built factory in Somerford Road, Christchurch. He soon had plenty of business making transformers for American pilots who needed to convert the British 240 volt supply to the 110 volt they were using, and lighting transformers for air raid shelters. Gardner's also won contracts with the Telecommunications Research Establishment and the Ministry of Aircraft Production. After the war, contracts from the Admiralty and the Atomic Energy Research Establishment allowed the business to grow and Gardner's were soon employing around 300 people. Gardner's contributed to the local economy not just because it was a major employer but also because it attracted others to the area such as Penny and Giles (potentiometers) and Plessey Defence Systems who came to take advantage of the local skilled workforce. The factory closed in the late 1990s partly due to an increase in cheap imports.
