= Golden Pot =

Hamlet in Hampshire, England

Coordinates: 51.1842°N 0.9862°W

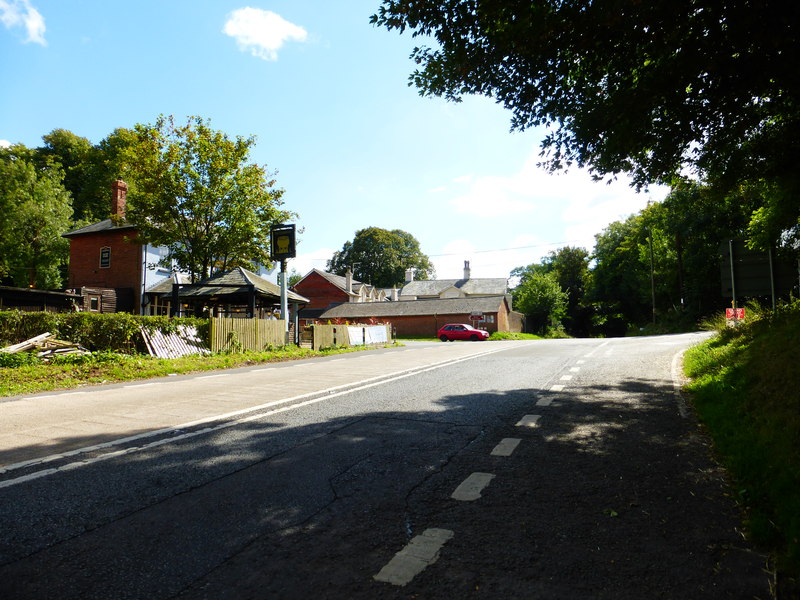
- Crossroads at Golden Pot

- Location within Hampshire
- OS grid reference: SU709432
- Civil parish: Shalden
- District: East Hampshire
- Shire county: Hampshire
- Region: South East
- Country: England
- Sovereign state: United Kingdom
- Police: Hampshire and Isle of Wight
- Fire: Hampshire and Isle of Wight
- Ambulance: South Central

Golden Pot is a hamlet in the East Hampshire district of Hampshire, England. It lies 2.4 miles (3.9 km) north of Alton, on the B3349 road.

The nearest railway station is 2.4 miles (3.9 km) south of the village, at Alton.
