= Bishops Sutton =

Village and parish in Hampshire, England

Coordinates: 51°05′00″N 1°08′07″W

Bishop's Sutton
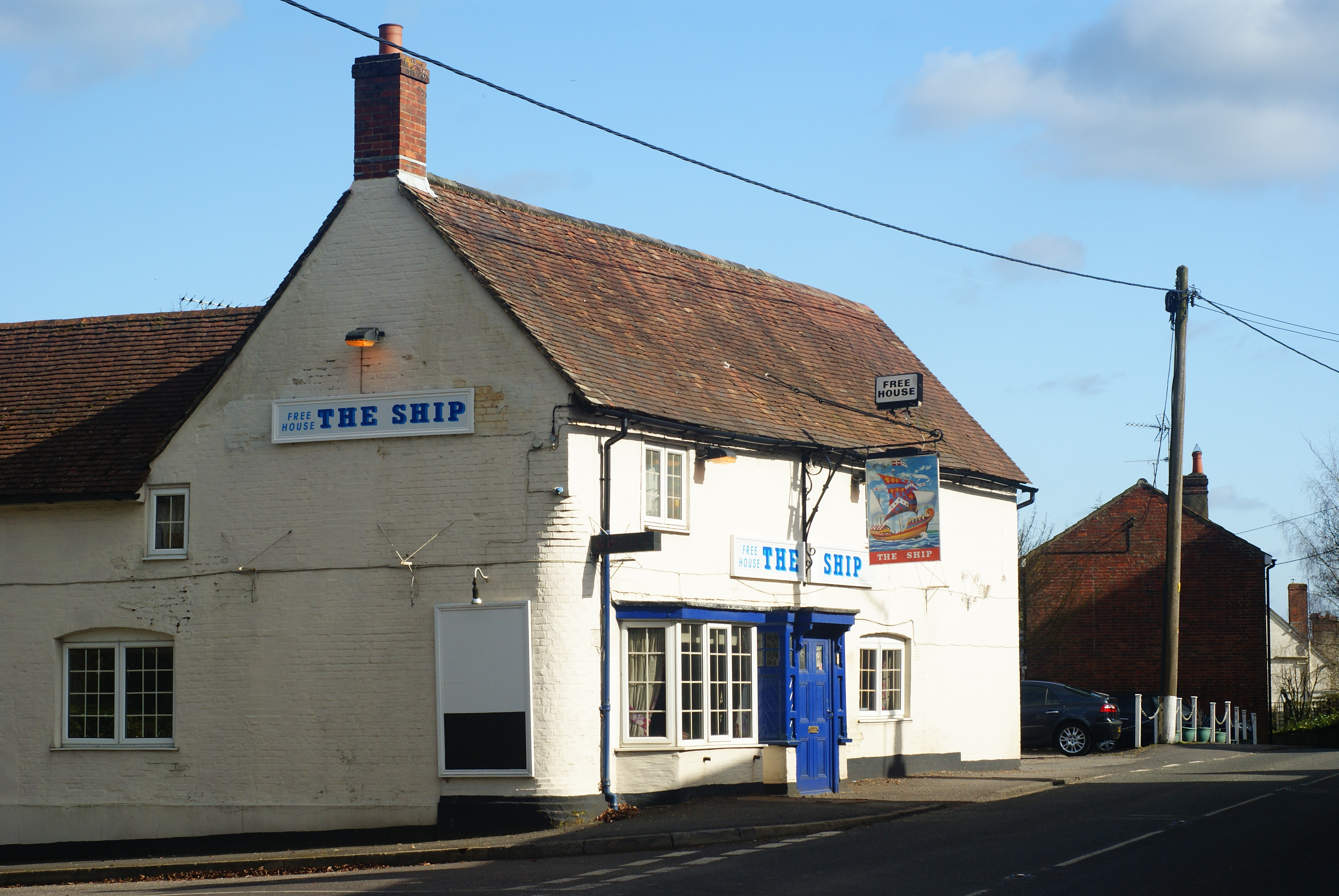
- Bishop's Sutton main street with public house

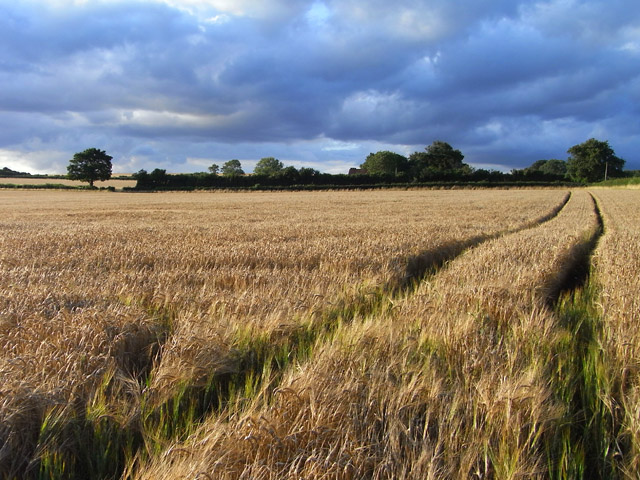
- Barley fields in Bishop's Sutton

- Location within Hampshire
- Area: 5.84 sq mi (15.1 km^{2})
- Population: 419; 463 (2011 Census)
  - Density: 72/sq mi (28/km^{2})
- OS grid reference: SU6066331907
  - London: 53 miles (85 km)
- District: City of Winchester
- Shire county: Hampshire
- Region: South East
- Country: England
- Sovereign state: United Kingdom
- Post town: Alresford
- Postcode district: SO24
- Dialling code: 01962
- Police: Hampshire and Isle of Wight
- Fire: Hampshire and Isle of Wight
- Ambulance: South Central
- UK Parliament: Winchester

Bishop's Sutton or Bishop's Sutton is a village and civil parish one mile (1.6 km) east of the market town of Alresford in the City of Winchester district of Hampshire, England. According to the 2001 census it had a population of 419, increasing to 463 at the 2011 Census.

== Geography ==
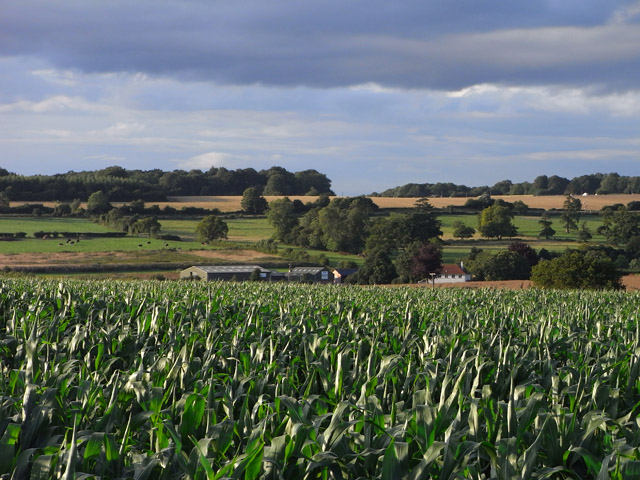
View from road and footpath towards the North Downs

The parish of Bishop's Sutton, has irregular shape and is an area of 3,739 acres (5.84 sq mi) with 9 acres (3.6 ha) of that being water. The village, which is at the centre of the parish, lies on low-ground (250 ft above sea level) compared to the surrounding area; it is by the head-waters of the River Alre. A long strip of land runs north-east between the parishes of Bighton and Ropley, rising to a height of 500 ft (152 m) along the downs to the north. South of the river the boundary extends to the high ground above Cheriton Wood and Bramdean Common.

Historically, Watercress cultivation formed a significant occupation in the area, due to its chalk geology and the calciferous River Alre allowing it to grow in the beds of Chalk streams. In 1865, the construction of the Mid Hants Railway, also known as the Watercress Line, meant fresh watercress could be delivered to London and further afield. Today, agriculture is still a major employer in the parish with southern areas being arable land for crops.

The main road in the village is the B3047 named Bishop's Sutton Road this bears medium to low traffic into Alresford and has two side streets in the centre of the village, Church Lane and School Lane. The A31 bypasses the village to the south. The average commute to work for residents is 15.14 miles (24.36 km).

The villages is by or on (depending on which track was preferred) the Pilgrims' Way between Winchester and Canterbury, which can still be walked via the North Downs Way.

== History ==
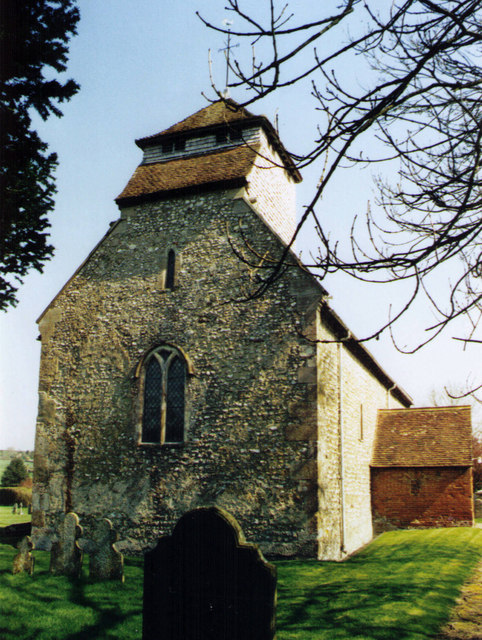
The Village's Church

In the Domesday Book, the Bishop's Sutton was recorded as Sudtone (which included Ropley and Bramdean), and the hundred of Bishop's Sutton was known as the hundred of Esselei, and comprised those places as well as West Tisted. Eselei, which was a small hundred, remained the hundred until the eighteenth century when the law was amended to make it part of the hundred of Bishop's Sutton.

A gazetteer of 1868 links Bishop's Sutton with a former residence of the Bishop of Winchester which was then used as a malthouse. However, in 1872 it is recorded that the Bishops once had a palace in the village with the only alleged remains being its kennel. The 1871 population was 537 in 114 houses.

The village has a number of historic buildings and many are thatched, with it being part of a conservation area. The Norman Church of St Nicholas, built in the 12th century, is a Grade I listed building. It consists of a simple two-bay structure of a nave and chancel although additions were made to it through the medieval period and into the Victorian era.

The village also has the grade II* 17th/18th Century brick-built Sutton Manor House which is on the site of an earlier timber-framed construction. Its garden wall is also Grade II listed.

There are also a number of grade II properties: Western Court Farmhouse, Old Ship Cottages, Newhouse Farmhouse, The Ship Inn public house, 1 and 2 Church Lane, Old Mill House, The Old Post Office, Tavy Cottage Yeoman's Cottage, Dairy Cottage, Grove Cottage and Bassett Farm Cottage and its granary. Several of these entries show elements of Tudor architecture.

== Amenities and community life ==
Much of the population is retired, and it won the Hampshire and Isle of Wight village of the year award in 2011 due to the wide range of events and activities organised to transcend the generations by the parish council. The village has a summer fete, an active village hall with links to local businesses and a village green with a pond and meadow used for recreation.

== See also ==
- The Hundred of Odiham
