= Lasham =

Village and parish in Hampshire, England

Coordinates: 51.17677°N 1.033553°W

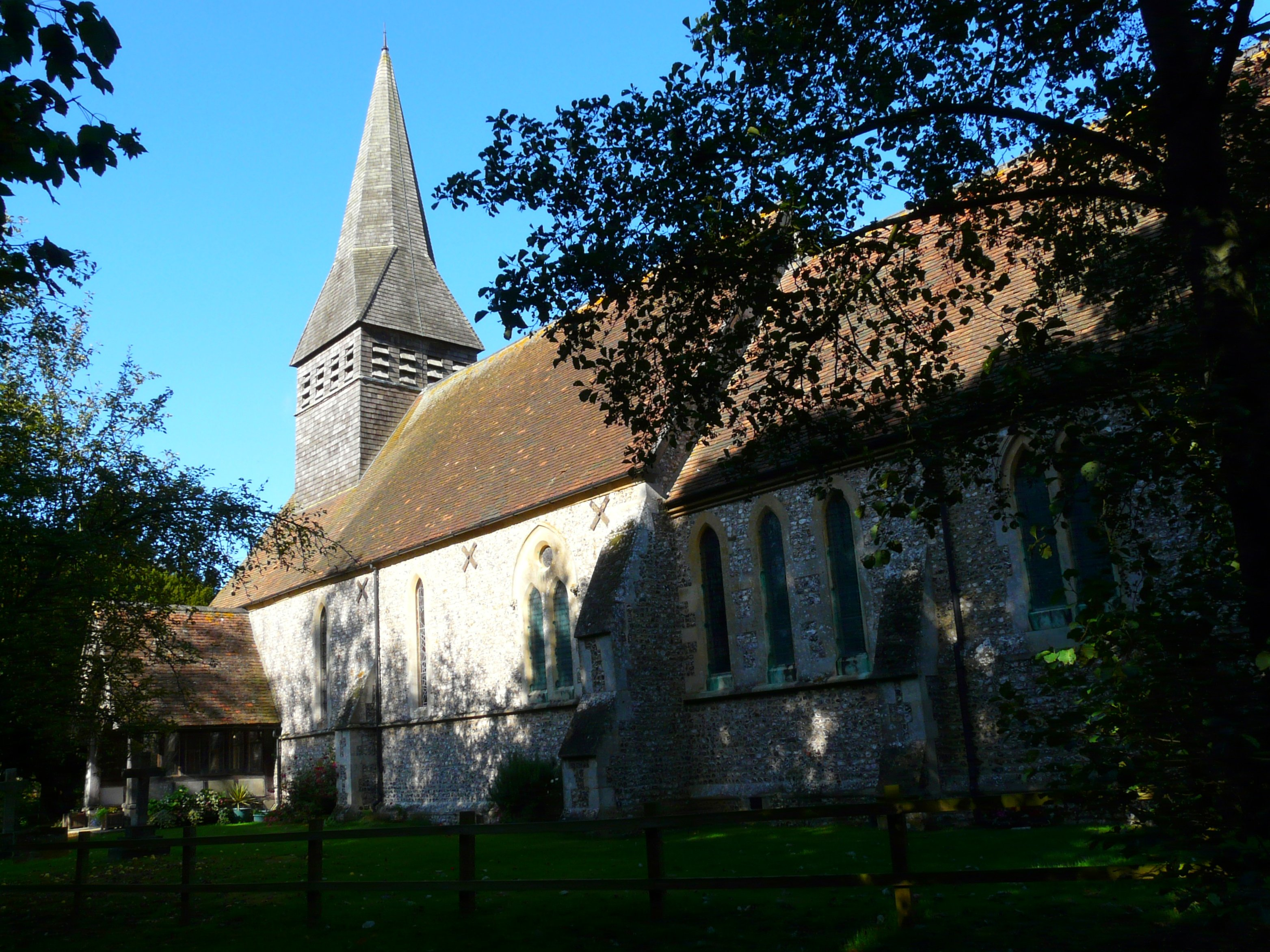
- St Mary's Church, Lasham

- Location within Hampshire
- Population: 176 (2011 census)
- OS grid reference: SU675424
- Civil parish: Lasham
- District: East Hampshire
- Shire county: Hampshire
- Region: South East
- Country: England
- Sovereign state: United Kingdom
- Post town: ALTON
- Postcode district: GU34
- Dialling code: 01256
- Police: Hampshire and Isle of Wight
- Fire: Hampshire and Isle of Wight
- Ambulance: South Central

Lasham is a village and civil parish in the East Hampshire district of Hampshire, England. It is 3.4 miles (5.5 km) northwest of Alton and 1.2 miles (1.9 km) north of Bentworth, just off the A339 road. The parish covers an area of 1,797 acres (727 ha) and has an average elevation of 560 feet (170 m) above sea level. The nearest railway station is Alton, 3.5 miles (5.6 km) southeast of the village. Lasham formerly had its own railway station, Bentworth and Lasham, on the Basingstoke and Alton Light Railway until the line's closure in 1936. According to the 2011 census, the village had a population of 176.

== Etymology ==
The name "Lasham" is thought to have originated from the Old English words læsc (a cleared plot of land) and ham (homestead or village). Thus, Lasham roughly translates to "homestead on cleared land," indicating that it was likely established as a small settlement in an area cleared from ancient forests or heathland. It has been spelled in various ways throughout the centuries, including Esseham (11th century), Lessham (12th century), and Lesseham or Lassham (14th century).

== History ==
The village of Lasham was originally held as an allodial title under Edward the Confessor and became part of the Crown's possessions in 1086, assessed at 2½ hides. By the late 13th century, Richard Fitz John was the overlord of Lasham. Upon his death in 1297, his nephew, Richard de Burgh, the third Earl of Ulster, inherited the fee held by John Dabernon. Another fee, held by the Prior of Portsmouth, passed to Robert de Clifford and Idonea de Leyburn, daughter of Fitz John's sister Isabel.

The earliest recorded tenant was Roger de Clere, who held the estate in 1175. He granted Lasham to his wife, Hawise de Gournay, as dower. After her death, the estate was expected to revert to Roger's brother Ralph but was instead granted to Ingram Dabernon. In 1207, the manor was divided between Walter Dabernon and Ralph de Clere, leading to the creation of two separate manors.

Ralph de Clere, a baron who opposed King John, forfeited his lands, which were granted to Ellis de Falaise in 1215. However, Henry III restored Ralph's lands in 1217. Ralph's successor, Sir Roger de Clere, sold the estate to John de Gatesden, whose daughter Margaret married John de Camoys. The Camoys family eventually lost the estate to the Prior of God's House, Portsmouth, in exchange for lands in Dorset in 1268.

In 1315, Idonea and her husband, John de Crumbwell, arranged for their half-fee in Lasham to be settled on them for life, with remainders to the Despenser family. However, in 1322, Edward II granted the estate to Robert de Baldok following the forfeiture of Roger de Clifford. By 1478, Sir Roger Lewknor held the estate under the queen as part of her castle of Odiham. The estate passed through various hands, including the Dawtrey, Pincke, Bartlett, and Blunden families, before being acquired by the Jervoise family, who remain the current lords of the manor.

The other moiety, initially assigned to Walter Dabernon in 1207, also changed ownership frequently. By 1268, it was settled on Simon de Montcuyt. John Dabernon, who succeeded Walter, granted land to Walter de Aberval in 1314. The estate eventually passed to the Hampton family, who held it until the late 15th century. The Waller family inherited the estate, and in 1576, it was sold to Sir William Kingswell. The Kingswell family held the estate until 1630, when Sir Edmund Plowden acquired it. The estate was sold to Anthony Guidott in 1705 and later passed to the Guidott family before being acquired by the Jervoise family, who remain the present lords of the manor.

The Royal Navy used the village name for a Ham class minesweeper, HMS Lasham, which was operational from 1954 to 1981.

== Lasham Airfield ==
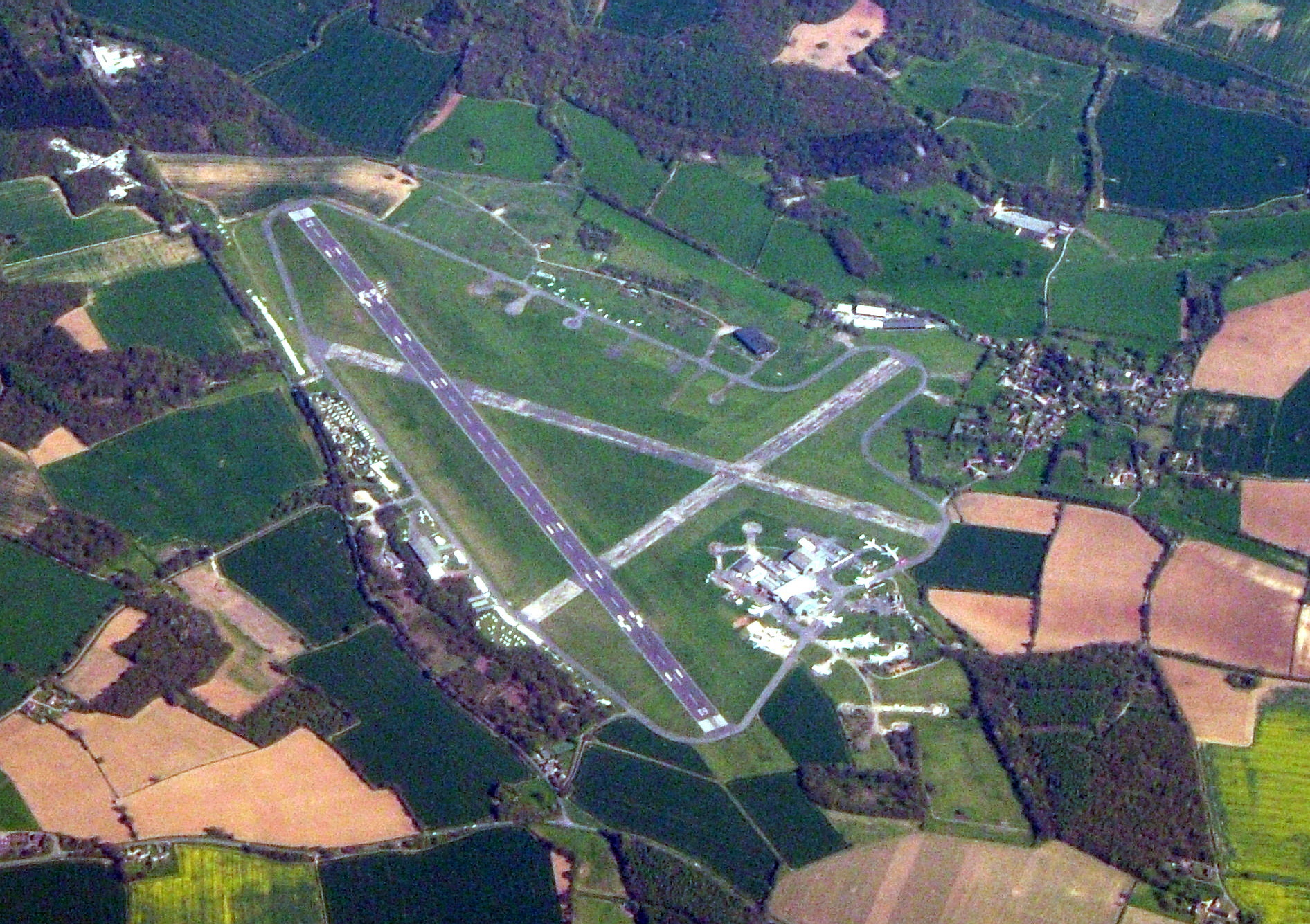
Lasham Airfield in May 2006, looking east. The village is on the right and Avenue Road is on the left, parallel with the main runway

Lasham Airfield was constructed in 1942 on high ground north of the village. An avenue of beech trees that was originally planted by George Jervoise in 1809 was partially cut down to make way for the north side of the airfield, and the road running east–west just north of the airfield is still called "Avenue Road".

The Basingstoke–Alton road used to pass through Lasham village but as the land to the north was needed for the west end of the main runway, the road between the Avenue and Lasham village was diverted to the west on lower ground and now by-passes the village, passing between Lasham and Bentworth just west of the old railway station. This road was made of large concrete "sets" and was built by Italian prisoners of war who were housed in a camp at Thedden Grange southwest of Bentworth.

The airfield is now a major centre for the sport of gliding and is owned by Lasham Gliding Society, which bought the land from the Ministry of Defence. The airfield is also used by a company called ATC Lasham Ltd, which services airliners, mainly made by Boeing, in hangars on the south side of the main runway.

== Highfield Site ==
This is a small group of business units on the road running north east from the church to Avenue Road, just outside the houses of the village proper.

=== Lasham parish ===
The church of St Mary, Lasham (CofE), was constructed in 1866 on the site of an older church, some of which went back to Saxon times.

The current Lasham parish boundary is Avenue Road

The Avenue, an old print and today

to the north, the A339 to the west and south (except for a small extension west to Spain Lane towards Burkham, and a line to the east between Lasham and Shalden.

Previously, for some 200 years, Lasham was part of the Herriard Park estate (which still exists today to the north of the parish). The villages of Herriard and Lasham used to have the same rector, the rectory being in Lasham. Today Lasham is part of a larger CofE benefice which includes the villages of Bentworth, Lasham, Medstead and Shalden, the Rector living in Medstead.

Avenue Road. An avenue of beech trees was planted in 1809 by George Purefoy Jervoise MP, to commemorate the golden jubilee of King George III in 1810. The original avenue was one mile long but in 1942 when Lasham Airfield was constructed, some of the avenue was cut down. When the plans became known, Sir George Jeffreys MP wrote a letter of objection which was published in the London Times newspaper on 7 October 1941. The Jervoise family continue to own the land to the north of the airfield today.

=== Transport links ===
The village was formerly served by the Bentworth and Lasham railway station on the Basingstoke and Alton Light Railway, until its closure to passenger traffic in 1932.

Today, the A339 Alton-Basingstoke road runs to the west of the village and the B3349 Alton-Odiham road to the east. Avenue Road, mentioned above and running on the north side of Lasham Airfield, connects the A339 to the B3349 at the Golden Pot public house at the top of the hill between Alton and Odiham.
