= Twinam =

Twinam is a surname. Notable people with the surname include:

- Ann Twinam (born 1946), American historian
- Joseph W. Twinam (1934–2001), American diplomat

== See also ==
- Twynam, surname
