= Shalden =

Village and parish in Hampshire, England

Coordinates: 51.17359°N 1.00543°W

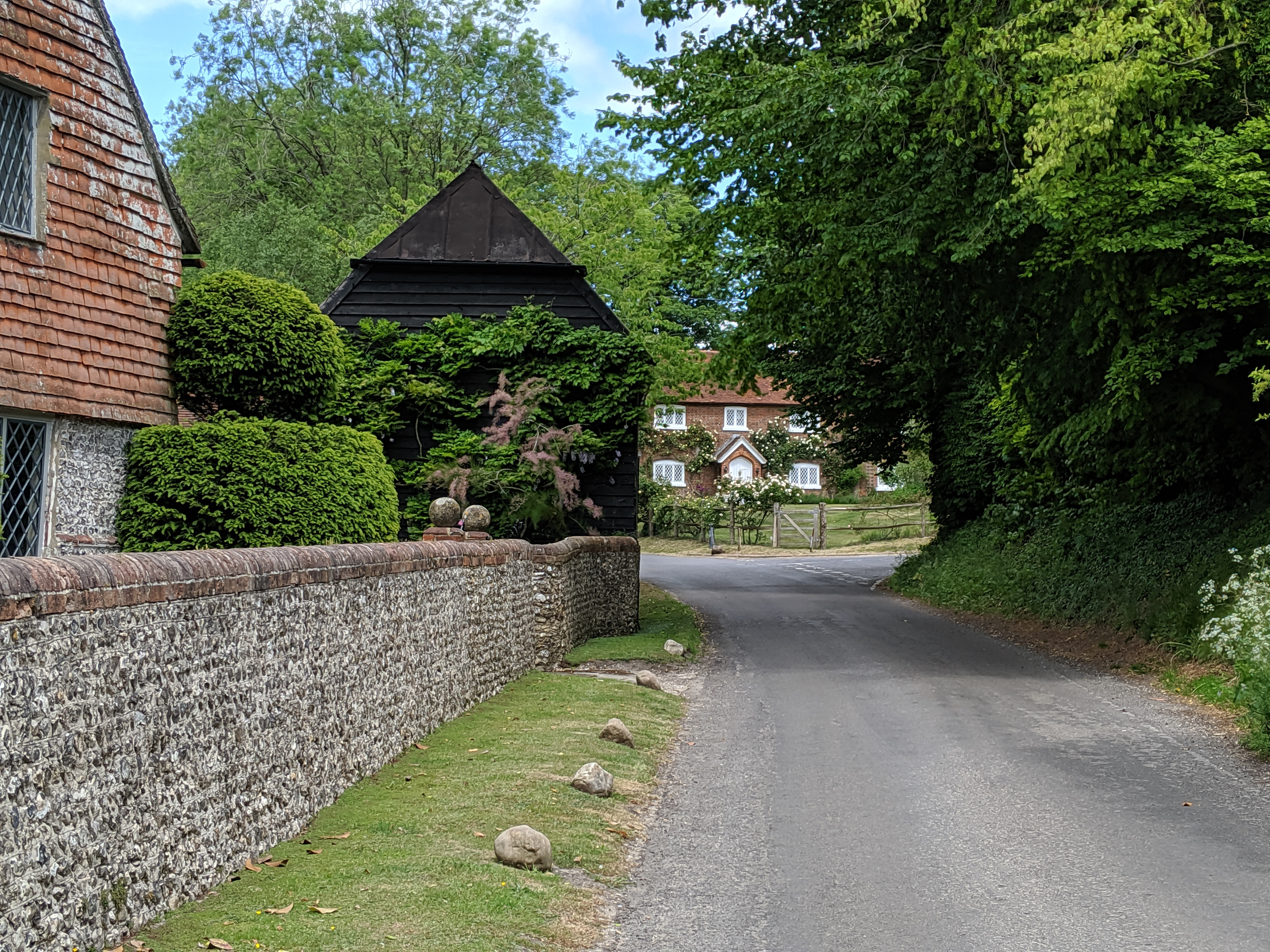
- View along the lane toward The Old Forge

- Location within Hampshire
- Population: 435 (2011 Census)
- OS grid reference: SU696420
- Civil parish: Shalden
- District: East Hampshire
- Shire county: Hampshire
- Region: South East
- Country: England
- Sovereign state: United Kingdom
- Post town: Alton
- Postcode district: GU34
- Police: Hampshire and Isle of Wight
- Fire: Hampshire and Isle of Wight
- Ambulance: South Central
- UK Parliament: East Hampshire

Shalden is a village and civil parish in the East Hampshire district of Hampshire, England. It is 2.3 miles (3.7 km) northwest of Alton and 1.9 miles (3.1 km) northeast of Bentworth, just off the A339 road. The parish covers an area of 1,536 acres (622 ha) and has an average elevation of 600 feet (180 m) above sea level. The nearest railway station is Alton, 2.5 miles (4.0 km) southeast of the village. According to the 2011 census, it had a population of 435.

Bronze Age and Roman remains have been found in the area. The manor of Shalden was recorded in the Domesday Survey of 1086, and was included in the Odiham Hundred. A Saxon church was in the village, but was destroyed and replaced with a newer church, which was constructed in 1863. The village contains twelve Grade II listed landmarks, including St Peter and St Paul's church, Shalden Lodge and Manor Farmhouse, a Grade II* listed building.

== History ==
=== Prehistory to Roman ===
The village name has been spelled in various ways, including Seldene (11th century), Schalden, Scaldeden, or Scaudedene (12th century), and Chalden or Scalden (13th century). There is evidence of Roman occupation in the village, with several Roman coins and pottery remains being found near Shalden school in 1905. There is further evidence to suggest that a Roman villa was once constructed in or near the village.

Bronze Age remains found in the area include a looped palstave and a cinerary urn. A Saxon church was formerly in the village; this was rebuilt in the nineteenth century, with flint and Bath stone.

=== Medieval ===
The manor of Shalden was first mentioned in the Domesday Survey of 1086 by William Mauditt of Hanslope. It had formerly been in the ownership of four freemen of King Edward the Confessor as an "alod". Shalden was included in the Odiham Hundred. The ownership of the manor was eventually passed to the descendants of William Mauditt alongside the manor of the nearby hamlet, Hartley Mauditt, under which the manor of Shalden was held. The manor was apparently held by the Mauditt family of Hartley Mauditt until near the end of the 12th century, when William Mauditt gave the manor to his brother Robert Mauduit of Warminster, to be held by William and his heirs for the service of half a knight's fee. Robert Mauditt died in 1191, and his son and successor Thomas was holding the manor between 1235 and 1236. He died in 1244, and was succeeded by his son, also named William.

William Mauditt left a son and heir, Warin, a minor, whose custody was assigned by Henry III to his brother Richard, Earl of Cornwall. During this time, Richard temporarily held the manor of Shalden from Henry until his death in1272. Consequently, Warin Mauditt held the manor until his death in either 1299 or 1300. Interest in the manor passed down to his son Thomas, in which he granted a sum of land at Shalden to a Knight named Walter Stoner and his freeman, in gratitude for his homage and services. At that time Sir Nicholas de Boys held the manor of Shalden as a tenant for life. In 1297 the Earl of Cornwall, in consideration of the services of Sir Nicholas, granted the manor to him and his heirs indefinitely. Sir Nicholas paid nothing for the manor, though his heirs were to pay £12 a year.

In 1309 Sir Nicholas de Boys granted the manor of Shalden to Robert de Kendale and his wife, Margaret, along with her heirs. The manor was then held by Ralph le Mareschal indefinitely. He was still holding it in 1310, however it had passed to Robert de Kendale sometime before 1316. Robert died in 1330, and his son Edward succeeded to the manor, but it was held by his widow Margaret until her death in 1347. Sir Edward de Kendale died in 1373, leaving a widow and a son as his heir for the manor of Shalden. Edwards's son and his brother, Thomas, both died without issue in 1375. Sir Robert Turk and his wife, Beatrice, conveyed the manor in 1376–7 to Sir William Croyser and William Bukbridge, trustees of Sir Edward de Kendale, to whom they transferred it in the same year. Edward's widow Elizabeth, daughter of Sir William Croyser, soon married Sir Thomas Barre, and died in 1420. Her heir was her grandson, but the manor of Shalden passed to John de Kendale, who held it in 1428.

=== Tudor to Georgian ===
Ownership of the manor was passed on to William Dyer in 1444, who was a trustee of a lord named Robert Lee. Ownership was then transferred in 1485 to Maud, Anne, Elizabeth, Jane, and Ellen, daughters of John Lee, who had claimed the issues of the manor was under the will of their father, and complained that they had been prevented from enjoying them by Reginald Sandes and Robert Norton, who were also trustees. In 1567, William Lee sold the manor to Anne Twynne, and in 1591 Richard Miller sold it to Sir William of Kingswll. It was sold again in 1628 by Sir William's son and successor Edward Kingswell to Sir Richard Young of Weybridge, of whom it was purchased in 1632 by Sir Humphrey Benett. Benett then compounded his estate in 1649, and sold the manor of Shalden in 1653 to Anne Mynne.

=== 19th century ===
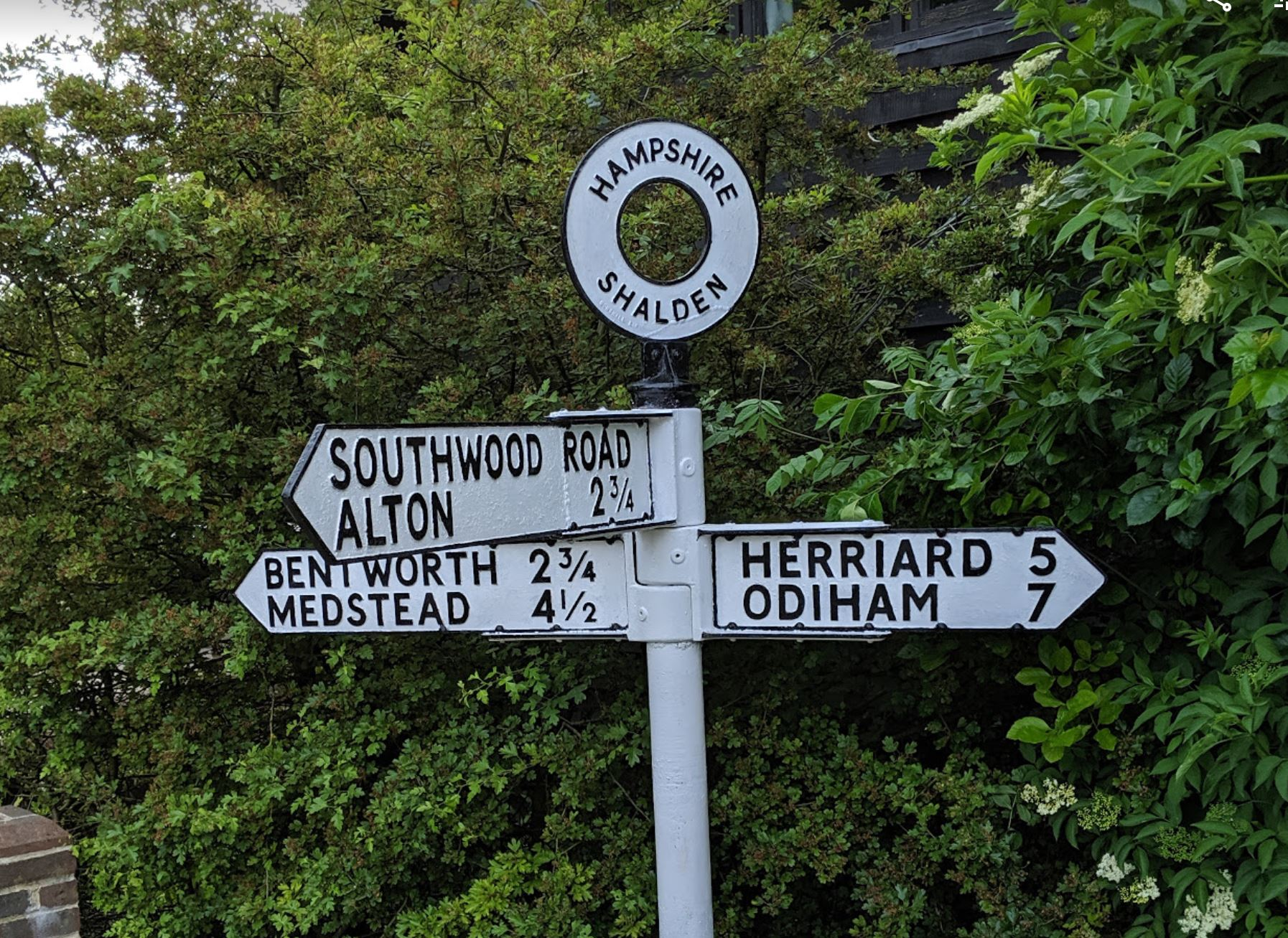
The village signpost displays the nearest settlements

At the beginning of the 19th century, the manor of Shalden was passed to John Lewkenor and his wife, Anne, of whom it was eventually succeeded by their John, at an unknown point. The manor was then ceded on to the Knights of Chawton, in whose family it remained until 1840, when it was sold by Edward Knight to John Wood, the owner of Thedden Grange in Bentworth. Upon his death in 1871, it was finally renounced to his son John Gathorne Wood, who was the last owner of the manor from 1871 to some time after 1912. In 1870–72 the Imperial Gazetteer of England and Wales by John Marius Wilson described Shalden as:

... a parish in Alton district, Hants; 2½ miles N W of Alton r. station. Post-town, Alton. Acres, 1, 509. Real property, £1, 396. Pop., 185. Houses, 37. The manor belongs to J. Wood, Esq. The living is a rectory in the diocese of Winchester. Value, £331.* Patron, the Lord Chancellor. The church is ancient.

== Geography and demographics ==
Shalden is located in the eastern central part of Hampshire, in South East England, 2.1 miles (3.4 km) northwest of Alton, its nearest town. The parish covers an area of 1,536 acres (622 ha), of which 194 acres (79 ha) are woodland. It has an average elevation of approximately 600 feet (180 m) above sea level, with some parts of the southern parish falling to heights of around 400 feet (120 m). The landscape is dominated by farms and woodland such as Shalden Manor, Glenville Farm and Oldale Wood. The soil is of clay and chalk, with a subsoil of chalk, and the prominent crops produced in the area are cereals. A large number of old chalk pits indicate that the chalk was once worked in the parish. The parish contains four individual hamlets; Stancombe, Shalden Green, Pountley and Golden Pot. According to the 2011 census, the parish of Shalden had a population of 435 people. In addition, there are 168 households in the parish with an average size of 2.59 people.

== Notable landmarks ==
Listed buildings and landmarks in Shalden

The following are the listed buildings in Shalden. The listings are graded:

- Aylesfield Farmhouse (II)
- Barn at Shalden Farm (II)
- Church of St Peter and St Paul (II)
- Garden wall extending from Shalden Lodge and including a service building (II)
- Greenmount Cottage (II)
- Honeycombe Cottage (II)
- Manor Farmhouse (II*)
- Shalden Lodge (II)
- Stable near the Manor Farmhouse (II)
- The Old Cottage (II)
- The Old Forge (II)
- The Thatched Cottage (II)

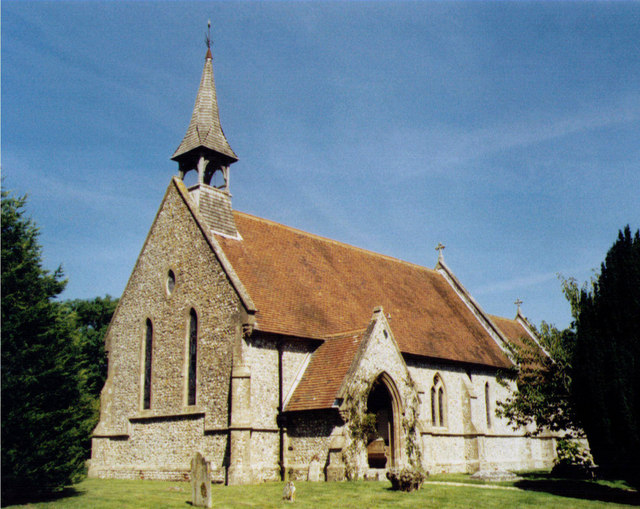
The modern church of St Peter and St Paul contains a remnant of its original 13th-century design.

The present church, St Peter and St Paul, was built in 1863, and is reminiscent of the 13th century in design. The bell-cot contains one modern bell. The old Saxon church stood a few feet to the south of the present one, and has been completely destroyed. The only piece of architecture that remains of the Saxon church is the font, which was re-used for the new church. The front dates from the 15th century and is of octagonal form, with a moulded octagonal stem and a panelled bowl.

The old Saxon church was given by William Mauditt to the prior and convent of Southwick between 1147 and 1153. The grant was confirmed by Pope Eugenius III and Pope Urban III in 1185. In the present church, a book of the registers contains baptisms from 1686 and marriages and burials from 1687, baptisms running to 1790, and marriages to 1753. The churchyard contains the Commonwealth war grave of a Machine Gun Corps soldier of World War I.

Shalden contains twelve Grade II listed buildings, in addition to one Grade II* listed building. St Peter and St Paul's church is a Grade II building, and the Manor Farmhouse in Shalden Lane is a Grade II* building. The Manor Farmhouse a late-medieval hall house, built with a timber-framed structure that covers two stories, dates from the 16th century, with early 19th-century cladding and 20th-century extensions. The house has a boarded door and a large porch. Inside are two wide fireplaces and a room with a Tudor arch. Shalden Lodge, another Grade II building, dates from the late 18th century, with early and late 19th-century alterations and additions.
