= Twynam =

Twynam is a surname. Notable people with the surname include:

- Henry Twynam (1853–1899), English rugby union international
- Henry Joseph Twynam (1887–1966), British colonial administrator in India
- Mervyn Twynam Davis (1916–1985), Australian servicewoman
- William Crofton Twynam (1827–1922), British colonial administrator in Ceylon

== See also ==
- Mount Twynam, in New South Wales
- Twinam, surname
