= West Tisted =

Village and parish in Hampshire, England

Coordinates: 51.05745°N 1.07035°W

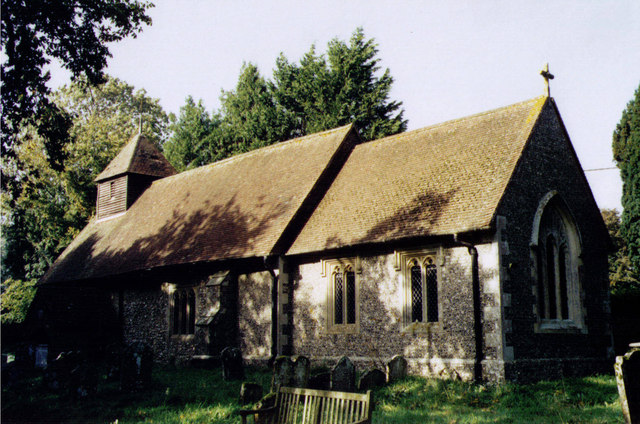
- St Mary Magdalene, West Tisted

- Location within Hampshire
- Population: 165 (2011 Census)
- OS grid reference: SU652291
- Civil parish: West Tisted
- District: East Hampshire
- Shire county: Hampshire
- Region: South East
- Country: England
- Sovereign state: United Kingdom
- Post town: Alresford
- Postcode district: SO24
- Police: Hampshire and Isle of Wight
- Fire: Hampshire and Isle of Wight
- Ambulance: South Central
- UK Parliament: East Hampshire

West Tisted is a small village in the East Hampshire district of Hampshire, England. It is 6.7 miles (10.8 km) northwest of Petersfield, just off the A32 road.

== Etymology ==
West Tisted is first recorded in around 932 CE as "ticces stede" . It derives from the Old English 'Ticce' and 'Stede' meaning Ticce's Farmstead. Alternatively the name might come from the word Old English word 'Ticcen' meaning young goat or kid, however the spelling of these early examples favours the first explanation. The Village shares the origin of its name with neighbouring East Tisted.

== History ==
The village was first properly settled in the early medieval period although a lot of evidence exists to suggest earlier activity if not settlement from the roman and prehistoric period.

In the 10th century West Tisted was part of the Anglo-Saxon Kingdom Wessex and its land was gifted from then King Eadmund I in around 941 CE. To manage this land gift a charter, a type of land document where the boundary of the land is described, was written for land then known as "Ticcestede". This charter is incredibly important for local history as it gives many early examples of place names for example Stapley Lane given as Stapol Wege and Clinkley Road as Clinca leage.

West Tisted is also home to a 12th-century church, which involves taking a small path over a moat bridge to find it. This moat is likely what remains of a manorial site, possibly even a Norman Bailey. Alongside the church is an ancient yew tree, estimated to be more than a thousand three hundred years old.

The village itself is notably thinly settled with no buildings but the church standing in the parish older than the 17th Century. This is because the village may have been deserted at some point in the middle ages.

The manor house which was built of red brick and stone, had its origins in the medieval period but was heavily rebuilt in the Elizabethan Style. Unfortunately the manor house was demolished in 1955–56 and was replaced with a modern mansion. The present house, now standing on a different axis to the original mansion, is a long structure, built of brick with a tiled roof. The gardens were heavily redesigned in the 1960’s, however some of the original features remain, such as a rose garden between the house and church, and various trees and yew hedges which once marked the original garden boundary.

Local aristocrat Sir Benjamin Tichborne, Knighted 1618, (born circa 1582-88 and died 1665) third son of Sir Benjamin Tichborne, 1st Baronet, lived in the manor house. He is reported to have fought for the Royalist cause at the Battle of Cheriton (1644) and afterwards hid in a hollow oak tree behind the church, this tree was still known until recently as 'Sir Benjamin's Oak'. and after dying with no issue was buried with his wife Margaret in West Tisted Church.

== West Tisted Manor Estate ==
The West Tisted Manor Estate is the largest landowner in the parish, covering over 1,700 acres. Manor Farm is the largest and most important farm on the estate, and sits adjacent to the Manor House.

The West Tisted Manor Estate was purchased in the 1990’s by R.S Hill and Sons.
