= Bighton =

Village and parish in Hampshire, England

Coordinates: 51.104380°N 1.125267°W

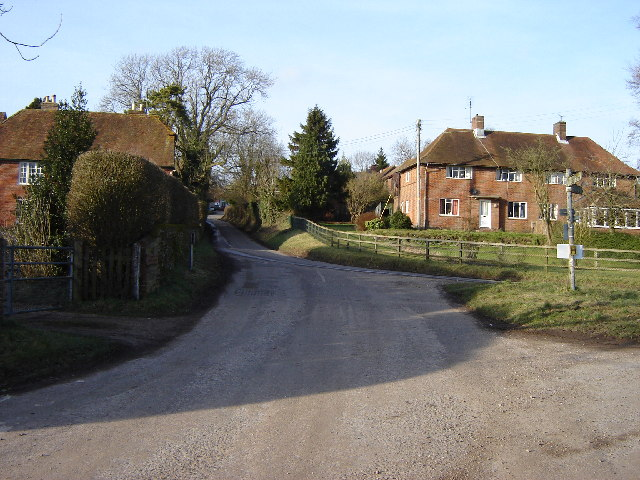
- The village of Bighton

- Location within Hampshire
- Population: 341 (2011 Census including Gundleton)
- OS grid reference: SU6134034261
- District: City of Winchester
- Shire county: Hampshire
- Region: South East
- Country: England
- Sovereign state: United Kingdom
- Post town: Alresford
- Postcode district: SO24
- Dialling code: 01962
- Police: Hampshire and Isle of Wight
- Fire: Hampshire and Isle of Wight
- Ambulance: South Central
- UK Parliament: Winchester

Bighton is a village and civil parish in the City of Winchester district of Hampshire, England. According to the 2011 census it had a population of 341, compared with 319 in 2001. The village is about 3 miles (4.8 km) north-east of New Alresford.

== Notable residents ==
- Victor Cannings (1919–2016), cricketer
