= Edgegate (hundred) =

Historic area of Hampshire, England

The Hundred of Edgegate, archaically called Egheiete, was a hundred of England situated in the county of Hampshire. In the Domesday Book of 1086, there were 8 places in the hundred.

== Places ==
- Holdenhurst
- Bashley
- Bosley
- Christchurch
- Hurn
- Hoburne Park
- Knapp
- Stanpit

== See also ==
- List of hundreds of England
