= George Jeffreys, 1st Baron Jeffreys (British Army officer) =

British general (1878–1960)

General The Right Honourable The Lord Jeffreys KCB KCVO CMG DL
- Jeffreys, pictured here when he was a major-general in 1920

Member of the House of Lords
- Lord Temporal
- In office 12 July 1952 – 19 December 1960
- Preceded by: Peerage created
- Succeeded by: The 2nd Baron Jeffreys

Personal details
- Born: George Darell Jeffreys; 8 March 1878 Mayfair, Middlesex, England
- Died: 19 December 1960 (aged 82) Burkham House, Alton, Hampshire, England
- Military career
- Allegiance: United Kingdom
- Branch: British Army
- Service years: 1897–1938
- Rank: General
- Service number: 12252
- Unit: Grenadier Guards
- Commands: Southern Command, India; 43rd (Wessex) Division; London District; Light Division; 30th Division; 19th (Western) Division; 1st Guards Brigade; 57th Brigade; 58th Brigade; 2nd Battalion Grenadier Guards
- Conflicts: Mahdist War; Second Boer War; First World War
- Awards: Knight Commander of the Order of the Bath; Knight Commander of the Royal Victorian Order; Companion of the Order of St Michael and St George; Mentioned in Despatches (9)

George Darell Jeffreys, 1st Baron Jeffreys (8 March 1878 – 19 December 1960), was a British Army officer and Conservative Member of Parliament.

Jeffreys attended Eton and Sandhurst before being commissioned into the Grenadier Guards. He saw action in Africa and in the Second Boer War as a young officer, and went to France with his battalion at the start of the First World War. He served on the Western Front throughout the war, rising to command the 2nd Grenadier Guards, then a series of infantry brigades, before being promoted to command the 19th (Western) Division from September 1917 until the end of the war. Following the armistice, he commanded a division in the forces occupying Germany, and then held various commands until he retired from the army in 1938.

From 1925 onwards he served as a magistrate and county councillor in Hampshire, and after retirement increased his involvement with local administration. He chaired a series of local bodies, and in 1941 was elected to the House of Commons for the constituency of Petersfield. He retired from Parliament at the 1951 election, and was created a peer the following year, as Baron Jeffreys. He continued to sit in the House of Lords until his death in 1960.

== Early life and family ==
George Darrell Jeffreys was born in Mayfair, then part of Middlesex, on 8 March 1878. His father, Arthur Frederick Jeffreys, was a rural landowner, with an estate at Burkham, near Alton, Hampshire; he was later elected to Parliament, as a Conservative, and held the seat for almost thirty years. He married Amy Fenwick in 1877; they had four children, George and his three younger sisters.

Jeffreys was educated at Eton College before entering the Royal Military College at Sandhurst. He passed out of Sandhurst in 1897, and was commissioned as a second lieutenant in the Grenadier Guards of the British Army on 3 March 1897.

In 1905, he married Dorothy, Viscountess Cantelupe. She was the widow of Lionel Sackville, Viscount Cantelupe, the eldest son of the Earl De La Warr, an officer in the Queen's Own Royal West Kent Regiment, who had died a few months after their marriage in 1890. The two had one son, Christopher, a captain in the Grenadier Guards, who was killed in the Battle of France in 1940.

== Military career ==
With his regiment, Jeffreys took part in the Sudan expedition of 1898, and saw action at the Battle of Omdurman. He was promoted to lieutenant later that year, on 28 November 1898, and later served two stints in the Second Boer War, in 1900–1901, and again from April 1902.

Following the end of the war two months later, he returned with most of the men of the guards regiments on board the SS Lake Michigan, which arrived in Southampton in October 1902. He remained on regimental service, promoted to captain in October 1903 and major in October 1910, until he was promoted to command the Guards Depot in June 1911.

On the outbreak of the First World War in August 1914, Jeffreys rejoined his regiment, and went overseas with the British Expeditionary Force (BEF). He saw service at the Battle of Mons with the 2nd Battalion, and was promoted to command it in June 1915, with the temporary rank of lieutenant colonel. He remained with the battalion until January 1916, when he was promoted to command the 58th Infantry Brigade in the 19th (Western) Division, with the temporary rank of brigadier general. He relinquished command of the brigade, and his brigadier's rank, on 3 May, but was re-appointed and promoted again to temporary brigadier general to command the 57th Infantry Brigade, in the same division, on 21 July, in the middle of the Battle of the Somme. On 30 December he again was transferred to command the 1st Guards Brigade, holding command through most of 1917, receiving a promotion in June to brevet colonel, until he returned to the 19th Division as its new commander in September, with a corresponding promotion to temporary major general. He commanded the division until the end of the war, during which time it fought at the Battle of Passchendaele, in the German spring offensive, and during the final Hundred Days Offensive.

During the war, Jeffreys was severely wounded, mentioned in despatches nine times, and appointed a Companion of St. Michael and St. George (in 1916) and a Companion of the Bath (in 1918). He was also awarded a series of foreign decorations; the Order of St Stanislaus (2nd Class) from Russia; a Commander of the Order of the Crown, Grand Officer Order of Leopold, and Croix de Guerre from the Belgian government; a Commander of the Legion of Honour and Croix de Guerre from the French; a Knight of the Norwegian Order of St. Olav; the Japanese Order of the Rising Sun (2nd Class); and a Grand Cross of the Romanian Order of the Crown.

After the armistice in November 1918, the division received orders to demobilise in December, and in February 1919 Jeffreys, who had been made a substantive lieutenant colonel the month before, was transferred to 30th Division. The 30th Division was assigned to the rear area ports, and was correspondingly later to demobilise. Promoted to substantive major general in June 1919, he was then transferred to command the Light Division in the British Army of the Rhine, the occupation forces in Germany, and in 1920 returned to England as Major-General commanding the Brigade of Guards and GOC London District, taking over from Major General Sir Geoffrey Feilding in February 1920. He relinquished command of London District in 1924, and spent two years on half-pay until he was appointed to command the 43rd (Wessex) Infantry Division of the Territorial Army (TA) in October 1926, taking over as HOC from Major General Sir Edward Northey.

He was promoted to lieutenant general in 1930, and again, after relinquishing command of the 43rd Division in October, was placed on half-pay, but was appointed to the Southern Command in India in 1932. This was his final active role and he held it until 1936, having been promoted to full general in March 1935. From 1936 to 1938 he held the ceremonial position of ADC to the King, and finally retired from the army in 1938.

In retirement, he was the honorary colonel of the 48th Searchlight Regiment, Royal Artillery (later 583rd (Hampshire) Heavy AA Regiment) from 1938 to 1948, the colonel of the Hampshire Regiment from January 1945 to 1948, and of the Grenadier Guards from 1952 to his death.

== Political career ==
Jeffreys' political career began in 1926, when he was elected as a councillor to Hampshire County Council. He left the council in 1932, during his posting to India, but was re-elected following his return in 1937; in 1941, he was appointed as an alderman. From 1938 he was appointed chair of the Hampshire Territorial Army Association and the County Civil Defence Committee, and in 1940, on the formation of the Home Guard, became its County Organizer. He also worked as a magistrate, becoming Chair of the Basingstoke County Bench in 1925, and continuing to sit until 1952, with the exception of a four-year gap during his Indian posting.

In a 1941 wartime by-election, he was elected as a Conservative to the House of Commons for Petersfield in Hampshire; he held the seat until his retirement in 1951.

The following year he was raised to the peerage as Baron Jeffreys, of Burkham in the County of Southampton. In December 1960, he died aged 82, and was succeeded in the barony by his grandson Mark, his son Christopher having been killed in action in May 1940.

== Arms ==
Coat of arms of George Jeffreys, 1st Baron Jeffreys
Crest On a wreath Ermine and Sable a demi-lion Or grasping with the dexter claw a wreath of laurel Vert. Escutcheon Ermine a lion rampant Sable and a canton Sable. Supporters On either side a lion regardant Sable crowned with an ancient crown Or and charged on the shoulder with two swords in saltire point upwards Gold. Motto Pod dawn o Dduw (Every Gift From God)

== Notes ==
Military offices
Preceded by Sir Geoffrey Feilding	GOC London District; 1920–1924	Succeeded by Lord Ruthven
Preceded by Sir Edward Northey	GOC 43rd (Wessex) Infantry Division; 1926–1930	Succeeded by Reginald Hildyard
Preceded by Sir William Heneker	GOC-in-C Southern Command, India; 1932–1936	Succeeded by Sir Ivo Vesey
Parliament of the United Kingdom
Preceded by Sir Reginald Dorman-Smith	Member of Parliament for Petersfield; 1941–1951	Succeeded by Peter Legh
Peerage of the United Kingdom
New creation	Baron Jeffreys; 1952–1960; Member of the House of Lords (1952–1960)	Succeeded by Mark Jeffreys
