= Reginald Dorman-Smith =

British Army officer, diplomat and politician (1899–1977)

Colonel The Right Honorable Sir Reginald Dorman-Smith GBE, PC
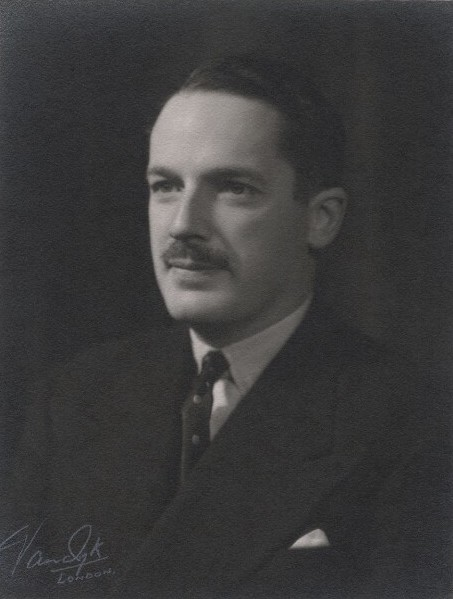

Member of Parliament for Petersfield
- In office 1935–1941
- Preceded by: William Graham Nicholson
- Succeeded by: George Jeffreys

Personal details
- Born: 10 March 1899 Cootehill, County Cavan, Ireland
- Died: 20 March 1977 (aged 78)
- Party: Conservative
- Relatives: Eric Dorman-Smith (brother); Gwyn Griffin (son-in-law)
- Education: Harrow School
- Alma mater: Royal Military College, Sandhurst
- Military career
- Allegiance: United Kingdom
- Branch: British Army
- Service years: –
- Rank: Colonel

Sir Reginald Hugh Dorman-Smith, GBE, PC (10 March 1899 – 20 March 1977) was an Anglo-Irish diplomat, military officer and politician who was a Member of Parliament for Petersfield from 1935 to 1941 and Governor of Burma from 1941 to 1946.

== Early life and politics ==
Dorman-Smith was educated at Harrow School and the Royal Military College at Sandhurst. After serving in the army, he continued his career with a strong interest in agriculture, becoming president of the National Farmers Union (the NFU) at the age of 32, and then later Minister of Agriculture. He was first elected as a Member of Parliament (MP) for Petersfield in the 1935 general election as one of a handful of MPs sponsored by the NFU and served as the Union's president for the following few years. As an MP, Dorman-Smith was a member of the English Mistery and its successor, English Array. English Mistery was a mystical "back-to-the-land" movement that sought to discover the "lost secrets" of the English as way as bringing about some sort of neo-feudal political and social order. In September 1938, Dorman-Smith spoke at the English Array's annual rally held at Farleigh Wallop, urging that Britain not to go war with Germany over the Sudetenland crisis.

In the late 1930s, the British Government's agricultural policy came in for heavy criticism from the NFU, Parliament and the Press and in January 1939 Prime Minister Neville Chamberlain took the bold step of appointing Dorman-Smith as Minister of Agriculture. As benefitting a former president of the National Farmers Union, Dorman-Smith was very close to the farmers' lobby and represented their interests in the cabinet. In October 1939, Dorman-Smith instigated the Government's Dig for Victory campaign, aimed at increasing food production from allotments. During the war, Dorman-Smith was opposed to the "nutritional" approach under which university-educated experts would instruct farmers in how to obtain maximum yields from their lands, saying in November 1939 "once we fall into the nutrition trap we are sunk". In general, Dorman-Smith tended to champion traditional farming methods and was opposed to pasteurised milk under the grounds that British people had drunk unpasteurised milk for thousands of years, and he saw no reason for any change. In the winter of 1939–1940, Dorman-Smith had "different conclusions" about agriculture with the First Lord of the Admiralty, Winston Churchill, who favoured the scientific "nutritional" approach to farming. From Churchill's viewpoint, increasing agricultural production would lessen the threat of a U-boat caused famine in Britain and free up shipping for other uses. When Chamberlain fell, Dorman-Smith was not included in the government of his successor, Winston Churchill.

Dorman-Smith was referred to in the book Guilty Men by Michael Foot, Frank Owen and Peter Howard (writing under the pseudonym 'Cato'), published in 1940 as an attack on public figures for their failure to re-arm and their appeasement of Nazi Germany. Foot, Owen and Howard had singled out Dorman-Smith as one of the "guilty men", blaming him for low agricultural productivity as a minister of agriculture at a time when the U-boat campaign threatened Britain with a famine. The British historian Andrew Marr wrote that Dorman-Smith was a "bizarre target" in Guilty Men as he was never very close to Chamberlain and was not particularly involved in Chamberlain's foreign policy, and moreover had only joined the cabinet in January 1939 after the Munich Agreement.

== Governor of Burma ==
=== Arrival in Burma ===
Dorman-Smith was appointed Governor of Burma from 6 May 1941 to 31 August 1946. He was in office at the time of the Japanese invasion and was expelled from the country by the Japanese. Burma was a turbulent colony as the Bamar had never really accepted the British conquest of Burma and the Great Depression by collapsing the price of rice had devastated Burma's economy. The thesis behind British rule in Burma was an implicit social contract under which the Burmese economy would grow in exchange for the acceptance of colonial rule; most Bamar took the viewpoint that the Great Depression had put and end to the social contract, a viewpoint not shared by the British. The British historian Michael Leigh wrote: "Dorman-Smith was complicated. Urbane, thoughtful, and fair, he was prepared to defend the underdog and could be intensely loyal to his friends...Perhaps he was not thick-skinned enough to be a great colonial administrator for he could be crippled by personal criticism and often grappled with a tender conscience. This rendered him indecisive and even self-delusional at times. He was neither a strong nor a weak leader, but his anxiety to do the right thing and to please people made him extremely vulnerable".

In July 1941, Claire Lee Chennault arrived in Rangoon seeking transit rights to use the Burma Road for the American Volunteer Group (AVG), an ostensible group of mercenary pilots who had been hired by Chiang Kai-shek to provide China with an air force that was in fact a thinly disguised American intervention in the Sino-Japanese War. On 23 July 1941, Chennault met with Dorman-Smith who was highly supportive of the AVG and promised Chennault everything he asked for. Dorman-Smith gave Chennault permission to train his pilots in Burma before going on to China; to use the Burma Road to bring supplies for the AVG; the right to install guns on his aircraft and to conduct live-fire training in Burma; observation posts in Burma; and the right to use the remote Royal Air Force airfield at Toungoo. Chennault described Dorman-Smith as a man who was very sincere in wanting to help the AVG. On 26 July 1941, Dorman-Smith reported to the Burma Office in London that he was "anxious to meet Chenault's wishes" and he expected no opposition from the Burmese ministers. On 27 July 1941, Dorman-Smith's agreement with Chennault was vetoed by Air Marshal Robert Brooke-Popham, the Commander-in-Chief of the British forces in the Far East who told Dorman-Smith that he exceeded his authority in giving Chennault permission to install guns on his aeroplanes and conduct gunnery exercises in Burma. Chennault went to Singapore to seek to change Brooke-Popham's mind, but the matter was settled by a directive from the War Office on 30 July 1941 that ruled in favour of Brooke-Popham. On 21 August 1941, Churchill intervened to rule in favour of Dorman-Smith. As the Burma Road was the only way by this point for Westerners to reach China, Dorman-Smith found himself entertaining a number of American visitors on their way to China. Clare Boothe Luce wrote in her diary that Dorman-Smith was the "big, handsome, able, dark, young governor".

Dorman-Smith had a strong liking for the Burmese prime minister, U Saw (like most Bamar, U Saw had only one name). He complained most of the Burmese politicians were corrupt, petty men who preached a highly chauvinistic version of Bamar nationalism. He especially disliked Ba Maw who had instigated bloody riots against the Indian minority in 1938, seeing him as a perfect example of the jingoistic Barmar nationalist. Dorman-Smith called U Saw a "true patriot" and a "likeable rogue" whose private army, the Galon, could be used for the defence of Burma. In October 1941, Dorman-Smith arranged for U Saw to go to London to discuss Dominion status for Burma with Leo Amery, the Secretary of State for India and Burma, and Winston Churchill, the prime minister. The talks were inconclusive as Churchill met U Saw only once and while Amery told U Saw that nothing could be done about granting Burma Dominion status until after the war. On 7 December 1941, Japan attacked the British empire. On his way home in December 1941, U Saw stopped by the Japanese embassy in Lisbon to offer his support for Burma joining the Greater East Asia Co-prosperity Sphere. The British had broken the Japanese diplomatic code and were aware of U Saw's offer, leading for Amery to send a telegram to Dorman-Smith saying that U Saw had just committed "a treacherous act" and was to be arrested immediately upon his return to Burma. U Saw was arrested upon his arrival in Rangoon and was exiled to Uganda for the rest of the war.

=== Invasion and evacuation ===
The forces defending Burma were inadequate with the 17th Indian Division - which had been assigned to defend Burma - being considered one of the worse divisions in the British Indian Army. Despite the fact that Thailand had allowed Japanese forces transit rights, British planners had assumed wrongly that the jungles on the Burmese-Thai border were "impenetrable", hence the decision to assign one Indian Army division and a particularly bad one at that to defend Burma. Burma had some of the most productive rice fields in Asia; was rich in oil, rubber and other raw materials; and the port of Rangoon was one of the largest ports in Asia which led the Japanese to make the conquest of Burma a priority. Furthermore, one of the central Japanese objectives to sever the Burma road which linked India to China, and by 1940 was the only route by which arms had reached China. The Japanese saw the conquest of Burma as the means to finally win the war against China which they had been fighting since 1937; by contrast British military planners in London did not seem to understand the Japanese obsession with severing the Burma Road and assumed the Japanese would not attempt an invasion of Burma from Thailand. Finally, reflecting the "Germany First" grand strategy, the Royal Air Force aircraft assigned to Burma were all obsolete, leading for the Japanese to have complete air superiority. Only the American Volunteer Group (AVG) under the command of General Claire Lee Chennault which on their way to China when the Japanese invaded were the only force capable of defending the skies above Burma as the AVG had modern aircraft, but even then the AVG was heavily outnumbered. On 23 December 1941 the Japanese bombed Rangoon for the first time and returned for a second time on 25 December 1941. At the sound of the air raid siren, Dorman-Smith retired to the air raid shelter under the Government House and stayed there until the all clear was given. Dorman-Smith went on to personally inspect the damage and reported that hundreds of people had been killed in the bombing. The second bombing raid did even more damage and set off dozens of fires all over Rangoon. Archibald Wavell had just arrived in Rangoon minutes before the second bombing raid started, and after greeted by Dorman-Smith at the Government House was forced to join him in the air raid shelter after the Japanese again bombed Rangoon. Dorman-Smith and his wife, Lady Dorman-Smith, were forced to spend Christmas Day and Boxing Day visiting hospitals to offer moral support for those injured by the Japanese bombing raids. The Dufferin Hospital was destroyed in the bombing raid, and the surviving patients had to be taken to Rangoon General Hospital, which itself was overfilled with bomb victims. Dorman-Smith complained that the doctors had all fled Rangoon and there were only three nurses to tend to the wounded.

Burma was a highly multicultural and diverse colony. The business and commercial life of Burma was dominated by Indian and Chinese merchants who were extremely unpopular with the Bamar majority who resented the economic success of the Chinese and Indian merchants. The results of the 1941 census were destroyed by a Japanese bombing raid. The 1931 census, which survives, reported of the 14,647,497 people living in Burma, 1,017,825 were Indians. Virtually all of the doctors in Burma under British rule were Indians, which fuelled resentment by the Bamar; even more damagingly was the fact that virtually of the policemen in British Burma were Indians, which led the Bamar to identity the entire Indian minority with British rule. When the Japanese invaded Burma in January 1942, the Indian merchants were the victims of attacks by the Bamar who looted their homes and stores while "roughing up" the Indians. Both the Chinese and Indian communities of Burma were convinced that the Bamar would massacre them all once the Japanese arrived, especially that they had already been anti-Indian and anti-Chinese pogroms in 1930 and 1938, stirred up by chauvinistic Bamar politicians who charged the Chinese and Indians were taking all of the middle class jobs at the expense of the Bamar majority. A delegation of the most wealthy Indian merchants visited Dorman-Smith to ask for his help in arranging protection for the Indian community, only to be told that there was little that could be done as most of the Indian policemen had deserted and fled back to India, leading to anarchy all over Burma. More out of fear of the Bamar than the Japanese, as the British retreated from Burma there was an exodus of the Indians in Burma into India. The flight of the Indians took place amid much suffering, and Indian newspapers frequently featured stories about the British authorities placing the evacuation of British families ahead of the Indians, and that the British colonial authorities were generally indifferent to the plight of the Indians. Such policies were the norm in the British colonies in Asia. The evacuation of Hong Kong in December 1941 was limited to those of "purely British descent" which excluded the Chinese population along with the Anglo-Chinese of Hong Kong and a similar policy was applied to Malaya and Singapore. In Burma, members of the Anglo-Indian and Anglo-Burmese communities found themselves excluded from the evacuation under the grounds that they not of "purely British descent". The evacuation created much frustration within the Anglo-Burmese and Anglo-Indian communities who found themselves to be too much British for the Japanese and Bamar while being too Burmese and too Indian for the British colonial civil servants. The structure of Burma as a colony with in effect home rule proved to be a major complication as Dorman-Smith often stressed that he was no autocrat and instead had to deal with the Burmese prime minister, Sir Paw Tun, and the Burmese parliament. Paw Tun loyally supported the British war effort, but much of his cabinet along with the Burmese parliament did not. The Bamar considered the Indians and the Chinese to be "foreigners" and the Burmese parliament did not want to vote for money for their evacuation, and instead much preferred to vote money for building air raid shelters, which benefitted the Bamar.

The bombing of Rangoon was deeply demoralising to people of Rangoon. The bombing of Rangoon started a mass flight out of Burma, which was to hamper the defence of Burma and caused much suffering. The Chinese community of Burma fled northwards towards China while the Indian community of Burma fled west towards India. At the port of Rangoon, thousands of Indians waited in huge lines for ships to take them to India, only to be told there was no barely any shipping available. Starting with the first bombing of Rangoon, a desperate competition to board any ships bound for India began with violence at the port becoming common as people pushed each other out of the lines, leading to frequent fights; touts sold tickets for any ship for India at immensely inflated prices; and bribery became rampant as the richer Indians sought to literally buy their way out of Burma at the expense of the poorer Indians. Making the competition even worse was divisions within the Indian community as Hindus and Muslims refused to travel together and within the Hindu community, the Brahmins and other higher caste Hindus refused to travel together with the untouchables and the other lower caste Hindus. So many Indians fled Rangoon in an attempt to walk out to India that the town of Prome soon had a vast open air refugee camp of least 20, 000 people sleeping outside. Sanitation did not exist in the ad hoc camp and soon cholera broke out. In early January 1942, Dorman-Smith visited Prome to ask the refugees to return to Rangoon, saying that with cholera raging it was unsafe for them to drink the water, and promised them they would be evacuated in an orderly fashion. On 14 January 1942, a civil servant, Robert Hutchings, told Dorman-Smith that there were about 40,000 Indians waiting impatiently at the port who were going to riot soon and that Dorman-Smith must tell the Royal Navy (which had taken control of the port) to allow at least some of the Indians to board ships. On 16 January 1942 after much lobbying by Dorman-Smith, the Royal Navy agreed that the Indians could sail as deck passengers on ships bound for India. During the invasion, relations between British civil and military officials in Burma were often strained, though Dorman-Smith had cordial relations with General Thomas Jacomb Hutton and General Archibald Wavell. Dorman-Smith appointed a "civil defence expert" to manage the refugee problem strained relations with the British officers who charged that the expert was ignorant, and many officers complained that massive columns of refugees on the roads hindered their ability to move troops and supplies forward to the front. On 20 January 1942, the Fifty-fifth Division of the Imperial Japanese Army based in Thailand invaded Burma and proved adept at using jungle trails to bypass the Indian troops. General Sir John Smyth, the GOC of the 17th Indian Division, thought that the Japanese would aim for Rangoon and stationed most of his forces in southern Burma; in fact, the Japanese were more concerned with severing the Burma Road and invaded northern Burma, which caught the British off-balance. Dorman-Smith came to serve as a scapegoat for all of the failures of British policy in Burma in 1942, with the journalists blaming him for the loss of Burma. Leigh wrote that Dorman-Smith meant well, but that he conflated the need to build air-raid shelters with the need to evacuate a million plus people to India and assigned both tasks to a relatively young man, De Graaf Hunter, as Civil Defence Commissioner who focussed on building air-raid shelters at the expense of evacuation.

Outside of the Government House, the residence of the Governor of Burma, thousands of Indians gathered outside looking for his help in fleeing Burma. Dorman-Smith told the Indians that he would do his best to arrange for their safe return to India, but was faced with a bureaucracy that constantly sabotaged his orders to do more to help the Indians. On 17 February 1942, Dorman-Smith sent his two teenage daughters, Patti and Jacqueline, out on one of the last trains to Calcutta. Every time, the train stopped, it was besieged by thousands of desperate Indians who attempted to climb aboard, only to be beaten off. As most of the policemen had deserted their posts, crime reached unprecedented heights in Burma and the Indian and the Chinese merchants who the victims of the most serious looting complained that Dorman-Smith was slow in proclaiming martial law. The most serious and the dangerous of the looters were gangs whom the British and Indians alike referred to "dacoits" after the bandits that plagued the Indian countryside. Despite their name, the "dacoits" in Rangoon were mostly Bamar from the Rangoon underworld. Dorman-Smith argued that proclaiming martial law would tie down soldiers who could be used for the defence of Burma and that the police were more familiar with conditions in Burma than the Anglo-Indian forces committed to defending Burma, but finally was forced to proclaim martial law on 20 February 1942 to put a stop to the looting.

The soldiers of the Gloucestershire Regiment, were deployed as an ad hoc police force with orders to shoot-on-sight any looters. From his window of the Government House, Dorman-Smith was confronted with an apocalyptic scene as the skyline was blackened with smoke caused by the fires started by the Japanese bombing raids; sirens wailed as ambulances to pick up the wounded; and the sound of gunfire was heard as the Gloucestershire regiment fought with the dacoits. Dorman-Smith wrote: "It is no ordinary affair to be compelled to decide whether or not to cede to the enemy a capital city of an Empire-country and to destroy much of what went to make it a great and important city. For us it was a ghastly day". On 11:30 am on 20 February, he told his wife to that is time for her to leave Rangoon, and at about 3: 00 pm, she left the city in the Governor's Rolls Royce. She described leaving a city ruined by fire and looting, full of burned-out buildings and streets covered with debris. On the same time, the news broke that 1, 300 criminals and "lunatics" had released from the jails and insane asylums of Rangoon, which was often used to attack Dorman-Smith as incompetent. He blamed "sensation-hunting journalists" for such unflattening stories as "Convicts are loose and lunatics too". Dorman-Smith defended the releases, which had been ordered by Burma civil servant, J. Fielding-Hall, who argued that it was inhumane to keep people locked up while being impossible to provide them with food and water. Fielding-Hall ordered the release of the most "harmless lunatics" to their families under the grounds that they would die of starvation and/or dehydration while also ordering the release of a number of petty criminals under the grounds it would be impossible to move them to Mandalay. Inspired by the stories of the mentally ill and criminals being released, entirely spurious stories of that the animals from the Rangoon zoon were being allowed to wander about the streets appeared, which contributed to Dorman-Smith's image of a governor who had lost control of his colony.

On 23 February 1942, the last merchant ship bound for India, the SS Jalligopal left Rangoon harbour. The Jalligopal left Rangoon without 500 Indian nurses and hospital staff who stayed at their posts because of a promise from the Burma civil servant, J.S. Vorley, that the British would take back them to India. Vorley told Dorman-Smith it was dishonourable to leave these people behind, and he agreed with him, giving orders to the Royal Navy commodore in charge of the port to find any ship to take them to India. After much argument, Dorman-Smith was able to have 300 of Vorley's hospital staff boarded onto a warship while the remaining 200 were put abroad one of the last trains to India. Dorman-Smith described the port of Rangoon as being a hellishly chaotic scene with thousands of desperate Indians pressing forward to board any ship that was leaving the port; there was much looting of the warehouses next to the port; drunken sailors were "rolling, staggering, some crawling, some flat out dead drunk"; and people were shooting up in the air with the guns they had looted from the warehouses. When the last ship left the port, the Indian refugees charged forward in an attempt to board the ship, leaving for the crew to cut the ropes and let the gangway crash into the sea. Dorman-Smith later estimated that between 20 January-23 February 1942 about 25, 000 people were evacuated via the sea from Rangoon. The closure of the port of Rangoon due to the danger of Japanese air and naval attacks was a huge blow to Burma's economy. Dorman-Smith later calculated that the closing the port of Rangoon had meant that 3 million tons of rice, 300, 000 tons of teak, 6, 400 tons of tin, 5, 400 tons of wolfram; 1 million tons of oil, and 1, 500 tons of rubber would not exported out of Burma that year.

Thousands of Indians died of heat exhaustion, starvation, disease or were killed by Bamar gangs while trying to walk through what were called Burma's "jungles of death" to reach the safety of India. Dorman-Smith came to face much criticism for the massive numbers of Indians who died while attempting to escape Burma. American newspaper correspondents covering the war in Burma were less bound by British censorship and were especially vocal in condemning Dorman-Smith for the mismanagement of the campaign and of the evacuation of the Indians. The war correspondent Leland Stowe of the Chicago Tribune was one of Dorman-Smith's most vociferous critics, whom he had lacerated in his articles as a bumbling buffoon hopelessly out of touch with reality, and gave him the unflattening nickname of "Doormat-Smith". Much of the rage of the American war correspondents and to lesser extent the British war correspondents as well was due to Dorman-Smith's tendency to put the most positive gloss on the news, which was sharply contradicted by the fact it was clear that the Japanese were winning in Burma. Dorman-Smith disliked the war correspondents, whom he called "vultures" who made their living by presenting the horrors of the war in Burma to the public in the United Kingdom and the United States, which made for adversarial relationship between the governor and the war correspondents.

As Governor, Dorman-Smith was forced to join the retreat out of Burma. Dorman-Smith wrote in the third person when he heard of the fall of Singapore in February 1942 that his "Mistery training stood him in good stead throughout the crisis and gave him the strength to carry on". On 1 March 1942, Dorman-Smith and his family fled the Government House in Rangoon to escape the advancing Japanese, and thereafter lived on the run on what Dorman-Smith called the "inglorious retreat" from Burma. Dorman-Smith later wrote that most people in Britain did not understand what it felt to be invaded, and that "only those who been the victims of an invasion can realise what it means to have a ruthless enemy ever pressing forward". On 1 March 1942, Dorman-Smith left the Government House in the early morning and flew out to Magwe. In March 1942, Dorman-Smith greeted General Che'en, the GOC of the Chinese 55th Division which had sent to help keep the Burma Road open. The stories that appeared in the Indian newspapers about the British colonial authorities putting the evacuation of British civilians from Burma ahead of Indian civilians, and that thousands of Indians had died while trying to walk out of Burma caused a firestorm of criticism in India. Much of the coverage was based upon reality. The British population of Burma had tried as much as possible to segregate themselves from "the natives" before the war and even in the emergency of 1942 refused any kind of shared accommodation with the Indian community, insisting the buses, lorries, ships and aeroplanes that were to take them to India not have any Indians abroad. On 30 March 1942, Dorman-Smith wrote a letter to Cordell Hull, the American Secretary of State, asking for American aircraft to fly out the 70, 000 Indian refugees who had arrived Mandalay, many of whom he noted were women, old people and children who would probably die if they tried to walk out to India. In response, he received a letter from Hull on 6 April telling them that starting on 16 April the U.S. Army Air Corps would make available five or six planes to fly out the refugees and promised that a total of 75 planes would be available by October 1942, which Dorman-Smith noted was too little, too late. As he retreated into Upper Burma, Dorman-Smith felt much guilt about the sufferings of the Indian refugees and often promised to stay until all of the Indians were evacuated. He finally arrived in Myitkyina, a city where he became lost in what he called "outer darkness", which was his term for depression.

On 30 April 1942, Dorman-Smith sent a telegram to Churchill asking him "to scrounge up a few more aeroplanes" to fly him and his family out of the jungle in Burma where they were staying to the safety of India. On 1 May 1942, Dorman-Smith received a telegram from the India Secretary, Leo Amery, saying that the News Chronicle had run a story saying the British colonial authorities had prevented Indians from boarding flights out of Burma and refused to allow Indian refugees to cross into India. Amery was due to face hostile questions about the News Chronicle story in the House of Commons on 7 May 1942, and he demanded Dorman-Smith either confirm or rebut the story. As Dorman-Smith was in the jungle with no records waiting impatiently to be flown out of Burma, he send Amery a rambling telegram noted for its grammatical errors that did not answer his questions. General Harold Alexander, the GOC of the British forces in Burma asked that Dorman-Smith leave Burma at once before he captured by the Japanese as he stated he did not want the governor's capture "to add to my anxieties".

Dorman-Smith's mood swung erratically from one option to another on an hourly basis as he declared he would stay in Burma until all the Indians were evacuated; demanded that a plane be sent to fly him out; or that would walk out of Burma via the Hukawng Valley as a way of showing support for the Indians who walked out via the same route. Amery told him that walking out was a "crackpot" idea and Dorman-Smith was forced to concede the Hukawng Valley was "no route for obese governors". Finally, Dorman-Smith decided to "clear out by air", but expressed concern that he "took up a seat that could be used by a refugee". On 2 May 1942, he telegrammed Amery asking that for "a Blenheim [bomber] in India which be used" to allow him to escape. He seemed not to have understood that reserving an entire bomber to fly him out might look worse than taking up a seat for a refugee. Dorman-Smith spent all of 3 May 1942 in Myitkyina waiting anxiously amid a tropical downpour while being assailed by mosquitos for an airplane to arrive to pick him up, saying he felt "thoroughly trapped" as no plane arrived and he was resigned to "capture by the Japanese" as the Imperial Japanese Army continued its advance to Myitkyina. Very late on the evening of 3 May, what Dorman-Smith called "two RAF types" knocked on his door to tell him that they had been sent to fly him to India. The officers had with them a letter from Churchill telling him that he was to leave Burma at once as there was nothing for him to do and "the above is to taken as an order". Sir Shenton Thomas, the governor of the Straits Settlements, had been captured by the Japanese when Singapore fell on 15 February 1942 and had been paraded through the streets of Singapore as a prisoner as a way to show the power of Japan; Churchill was determined to prevent another British governor in Asia from being humiliated in the same way, telling Dorman-Smith that he did not want to see him paraded through the streets of Rangoon as a Japanese prisoner. Dorman-Smith wrote he could "not bear the thought of getting out myself and leaving thousands of Burmans, Anglo-Indians and Indians to the tender mercies of the Japanese".

On 4 May 1942, the first anniversary of Dorman-Smith being sworn in as Governor of Burma in 1941, Dorman-Smith boarded a Blenheim bomber that flew him to India. On 9 May 1942, Amery sent another telegram to Dorman-Smith demanding answers to four "simple questions", namely what arrangements had Dorman-Smith made for the evacuation of the Indians from Burma; how many Indians had been evacuated since January; how were the Indians treated in the refugee camps along the India-Burma border; and what had happened to the Indian refugees who walked along the Tamu route to India? Dorman-Smith did not answer this telegram, and instead the Viceroy of India, Lord Linlithgow replied on his behalf, to say that 40,000 Indian refugees had been received since January. In his hideaway in the Burmese jungle, Dorman-Smith was haunted by a sense of guilt over the chaotic and badly managed evacuation of Burma. In 1942, it is estimated that about 600, 000 people fled Burma to India and about 80, 000 of them died in the "jungles of death", mostly of starvation and/or disease.

=== Governor-in-exile ===
Between May 1942 and Oct 1945, he was in exile at Simla, India. His reputation was badly damaged by a bestselling book in the United States, A Million Died: A Story of the War in the Far East by the American journalist Alfred Wagg, that had been published in the autumn of 1942 that blamed Dorman-Smith for the botched evacuation from Burma. Wagg had covered the campaign in Burma in 1942 and was outraged by the sight of so many Indians dying while trying to walk through the "jungles of death". Wagg came to have a deep hatred of Dorman-Smith, whom he personally held responsible for fall of Burma along with the suffering of the Indians the "jungles of death". Dorman-Smith was sympathetic to Bamar nationalists and looked forward to the day when Burma would be granted Dominion status to join the British Commonwealth. The Burmese politicians he chose to work in exile in Simla tended to the more moderate Bamar nationalists who saw Britain as a possible ally who help Burma after the war. The Bamar had a deep suspicion of China, whom they regarded as an overbearing neighbour, and some of the Bamar politicians saw Britain as an ally. Tin Tut wrote to Dorman-Smith in April 1943 that after the war it was clear: "that Burma will need a powerful friend and where better can she find one than in an England who will prove her generosity and disinterestedness by the grant of Dominion Status?"

In April 1943 Dorman-Smith together with Amery met with Churchill to discuss the post-war future of Burma. Churchill committed himself to the restoration of British rule together with a promise of aid to rebuild Burma, but refused to make further commitments such as Dominion status for Burma, claiming that the time was not right. Both Amery and Dorman-Smith believed that for Churchill the time would never be right and he intended Burma to be a British colony forever. On 1 July 1943, Dorman-Smith wrote to Amery: "I can not help thinking that it would be a bad thing politically actually to do away with the office of Governor of Burma, if only because it would be a welcome propaganda point for the Japanese who would doubtless use it to demonstrate either that we have given up all hopes of retaking Burma or that we visualise setting up a Military Government in Burma." In July 1943, Amery recalled Dorman-Smith to London for more meetings on the future of Burma. On 12 July 1943, Dorman-Smith wrote to Lord Linlithgow: "This home visit does not fill me with any great joy though it may serve the useful purpose of clarifying things a bit. But I am forced to wonder whether the position of a Governor without a country, whose country anyway has declared war on us does not in fact completely beggar clarification." Churchill was enraged by a speech Dorman-Smith had given in New Delhi where he said: "Burma belonged to the Burmese, and when the time came for full self-government, 'we must try to hand over the country for which we have done a good job of work!" Churchill wrote about Dorman-Smith's speech to Amery: "He seems to have been talking a lot of nonsense about our handing over Burma, etc. Let me have a full report of the speech." For his part, Paw Tun, the leader of the Burmese government-in-exile wrote to Dorman-Smith asking to press Churchill for a promise of independence, saying the recent statements about restoring Burma as a colony would "create a deep sense of despair" among the Bamar people. Paw Tun observed that the Japanese had created a puppet Burmese state headed by Ba Maw, and that many Bamar would conclude that the Japanese empire offered the Burmese more than the British empire. Tin Tut, another pro-British Burmese politician in exile in India, wrote to Dorman-Smith that most Burmese could see the Greater East Asia Co-Prosperity Sphere was a sham, but wanted the British to make a firm promise of independence after the victory over Japan. Tin Tut noted that President Franklin D. Roosevelt had given a firm promise that the United States would grant independence to the Philippines after the defeat of Japan, and wanted Churchill to make a similar promise for Burma. In October 1943, Dorman-Smith made a speech in London before the East Indian Association. His speech lamented the fact that while the British had talked for years about self-government and reform in Asia, they had delivered very little of it which had damaged their credibility. He said:

"Neither our word nor our intentions are trusted in that part of the globe ... We have fed such countries as Burma on political formulae until they are sick at the very sight and sound of a formula, which has come, as far as my experience shows, to be looked upon as a very British means of avoiding a definite course of action."

The speech said that pre-war British policy on these subjects was discredited and a new credible approach was required after the war. In March 1944, Dorman-Smith compared the Bamar to the Irish, writing that like the Irish the Bamar are ""a romantic people, fed from childhood on the pristine greatness of their country; superstitious...and very gullible but being mostly a nation of peasants they have the cunning and shrewdness of the eternal peasant...The honesty of their politicians and minor officials may be open to question but I have seen too much of the ways of politicians and officials in other countries to be over-shocked by such petty graft as went on in Burma." Extending his comparison, Dorman-Smith wrote that Burma had been conquered by the British in 1885 and the Bamar had never accepted British rule, writing "the fact is that they never really accepted our rule any more than the Irish accepted it...they never ceased to be ardent and active nationalists." Dorman-Smith noted that Burma had been a major power in Southeast Asia for centuries before the British arrived, and that because Burma had been annexed to the British empire in 1885, the older Bamar could remember when Burma was still independent, making for a difficult relationship between the British rulers and the Bamar ruled. He concluded the reason why the Bamar welcomed the Japanese as liberators in 1942 was because the British had lied to the Bamar too many times about possible independence, writing "we signally failed to rouse their enthusiasm for our cause". Dorman-Smith was resolutely opposed to making any sort of deal with the Bamar ultra-nationalists who served as Japanese collaborators, and dismissed the Burma Independence Army formed by the Japanese as the "Burma Traitor Army". Likewise, Dorman-Smith favoured having an independent Burma being a federation under the account that Burma had sizable minority groups such as the Shan, the Karen, the Chin, the Mon, the Karenni, the Kachin, the Mon, and so forth who would not welcome a unitary state dominated by the Bamar. By contrast, Admiral Louis Mountbatten, the GOC of Southeast Asia Command, was more open to making a deal with General Aung San who by 1944 was complaining that the Japanese treated the Bamar worse than the British and that he was prepared to defect with his army.

Major-General Sir Hubert Rance, the British military commander, took control of the country for the military after the liberation of Rangoon, but Dorman-Smith returned as governor in 1945. On 16 October 1945, Dorman-Smith sailed into Rangoon abroad the cruiser HMS Cleopatra to resume his duties as governor. There were no cheering crowds and Dorman-Smith and his wife found a city badly damaged by the war and a sullen population that did not welcome their return. Dorman-Smith made a tour of Burma while Lady Dorman-Smith was occupied with various social events as visiting orphanages and hospitals. The people whom attended parties hosted by the Dorman-Smiths at the Government House tended to be people outside of Burma as few Burmese wanted to associate with them. Dorman-Smith much to his discomfort discovered for the Bamar the hero of the hour was General Aung San who first fought for the Japanese before defecting and fighting for the British. Aung San made it clear to Dorman-Smith he only supported the British to expel the Japanese from Burma, and now that Japan was defeated, he expected the British to leave Burma as soon as possible, making a great show of being rude to the governor to emphasise that he wanted to see Dorman-Smith gone. Dorman-Smith found himself out of favour with everyone as the new Labour government did not trust him; Churchill regarded him as a "liability"; Aung San saw him as an enemy; the British media were hostile towards him; and the returning Indians blamed him for the botched evacuation of 1942. Dorman-Smith considered arresting Aung San for a murder he committed in 1942. In that year, Aung San had stabbed the restrained headman of Thebyugone village to death in front of a large crowd. Dorman-Smith was convinced by his superiors not to carry out the arrest.

While Dorman-Smith was back in the UK for medical reasons, he was replaced by Rance, who was supported by Lord Mountbatten of Burma and fully backed a policy of immediate unconditional independence for Burma under the leadership of the AFPFL. In June 1946, Dorman-Smith returned to his house in the village of Stodham in the Hampshire countryside for rest and relaxation. On 3 August 1946, he learned that he would not be returning to Burma as the prime minister Clement Attlee had decided to replace him with Rance. Lady Dorman-Smith wrote in her diary "it was a mean way to treat Reg" with Attlee and Moutbatten discussing the merits of replacing Dorman-Smith with Rance for weeks without anyone telling Dorman-Smith he was considered a failure as governor. One British Army public relations officer stated that Dorman-Smith was the victim of intrigue as senior officers who had "decided to use Dorman-Smith as a scapegoat for the collapse of Burma in 1942...so as to divert attention from the Army's failures".

== Simla Conference 1944 ==
As the Governor of Burma, Sir Reginald Dorman-Smith met with Anglo-Burmese leaders in Simla in 1944, to discuss the future of the Anglo-Burmese community after the war.

The Anglo-Burmese delegates were:

- Mr. G. Kirkham
- Mr. H.J. Mitchell B.Fr.S.
- Mr. J. Barrington I.C.S.
- Mr. K.W. Foster B.C.S.
- Mr. E.A. Franklin I.C.S
- Mr. W.A. Gibson
- Mrs. K. Russell
- Mr. H. Elliott
- Mr. C.H. Campagnac
- Mr. J.A. Wiseham
- Mr. J.F. Blake

One result of the conference was an assurance to the Anglo-Burmese community that they would be allowed to preserve their freedom of worship and allowed to teach their own religion, freedom to continue their own customs, and maintain their own language of English.

After leaving Burma, Dorman-Smith continued to take an interest in its affairs. He believed that if London had not intervened, he could have influenced the course of events in Burma so as to prevent the country from leaving the British Commonwealth.

== Family ==
Dorman-Smith was born to a Protestant Anglo-Irish father and an Irish Catholic mother at Bellamont House, Cootehill, County Cavan, Ireland, and was educated at Harrow and Sandhurst. He served briefly in the British Indian Army before being invalided out, then joined a volunteer battalion of the Queen's Royal Regiment.

One of Dorman-Smith's two brothers, Eric Dorman-Smith, was a major-general in the British Army in the Second World War. After falling out with the British establishment, he became an Irish republican sympathiser and changed his name to Eric Dorman O'Gowan. His other brother, Victor Dorman-Smith, was a Royal Navy captain who served as a member of Combined Operations HQ during World War One.

His daughter Patricia married the novelist Gwyn Griffin in 1950.

== Sources ==
- Bayly, Christopher Alan; Harper, Norman (2004). Forgotten Armies The Fall of British Asia, 1941-1945. Cambridge: Belknap Press. ISBN 9780674017481.
- Buchan, Eugenie (2017). A Few Planes for China The Birth of the Flying Tigers. Boston: University Press of New England. ISBN 9781611688665.
- Callahan, Mary Patricia (2003). Making Enemies War and State Building in Burma. Itahca: Cornell University Press. ISBN 9780801472671.
- Griffiths, Richard (1980). Fellow Travellers of the Right British Enthusiasts for Nazi Germany, 1933-9. London: Constable. ISBN 0571271324.
- Leigh, Michael (2014). The Evacuation of Civilians from Burma Analysing the 1942 Colonial Disaster. London: Bloomsbury Publishing. ISBN 9781441163943.
- Leigh, Michael (2018). The Collapse of British Rule in Burma The Civilian Evacuation and Independence. London: Bloomsbury Publishing. ISBN 9781472589750.
- Marr, Andrew (2009). The Making of Modern Britain. London: Pan Macmillan. ISBN 9780230747173.
- Pham, Julie (July 2004). "Ghost hunting in colonial Burma: Nostalgia, paternalism and the thoughts of J.S. Furnivall". South East Asia Research. 12 (2): 237–268. doi:10.5367/0000000041524734.
- Swanberg, William Andrew (1972). Luce and His Empire. New York: Scribner.
- Tarling, Nicholas (September 1982). ""An Empire Gem": British Wartime Planning for Post-War Burma, 1943-44". Journal of Southeast Asian Studies. 13 (2): 310–348. doi:10.1017/S0022463400008729.
- Wilt, Alan F. (2001). Food for War Agriculture and Rearmament in Britain Before the Second World War. Oxford: Oxford University Press. ISBN 9780191543340.

Parliament of the United Kingdom
Preceded by William Graham Nicholson	Member of Parliament for Petersfield; 1935–1941	Succeeded by George Jeffreys
Political offices
Preceded by William Shepherd Morrison	Minister of Agriculture; 1939–1940	Succeeded by Robert Hudson
Government offices
Preceded by Sir Archibald Douglas Cochrane	Governor of British Crown Colony of Burma; 1941–1946	Succeeded by Major-General Sir Hubert Rance
