= Bradley, Hampshire =

Village and parish in Hampshire, England

Coordinates: 51.171548°N 1.094078°W

Bradley
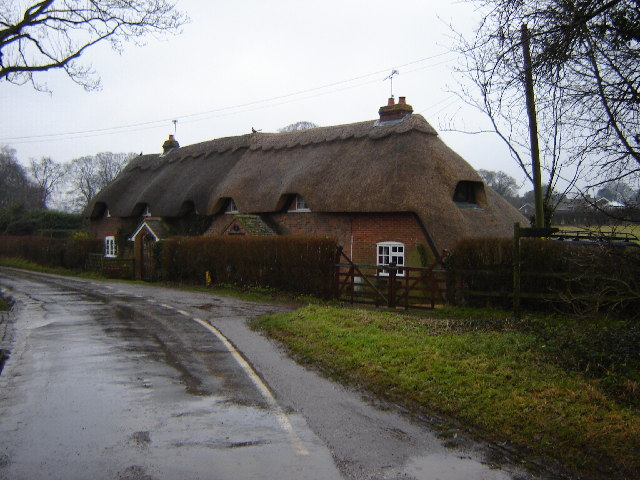
- Cottages in Bradley

- Location within Hampshire
- Population: 202 (2011 Census)
- OS grid reference: SU6343141757
- District: Basingstoke and Deane
- Shire county: Hampshire
- Region: South East
- Country: England
- Sovereign state: United Kingdom
- Post town: ALRESFORD
- Postcode district: GU35
- Dialling code: 01420
- Police: Hampshire and Isle of Wight
- Fire: Hampshire and Isle of Wight
- Ambulance: South Central

Bradley is a small village and civil parish in the Basingstoke and Deane district of Hampshire, England. Its nearest town is Alton, which lies 5.4 miles (8.7 km) southeast from the village, although Basingstoke lies 6.6 miles (10.6 km) to the north. According to the 2011 census, the village had a population of 202 people. The parish covers an area of 975 acres (395 ha), of which 149 acres (60 ha) is woodland and its highest point is 170 metres (560 ft) above sea level. It contains no hamlets.

The village was first mentioned in a charter made by Edward the Elder in 909, and was confirmed to be part of Overton at the time of the Domesday Survey. Bradley later became a separate manor and passed through several families throughout the centuries. The village contains a total of seven Grade II listed buildings, and one Grade II* listed building—the Church of All Saints. Other listed buildings include three large farmhouses and a K6 telephone box which sits beside the village pond. Its nearest railway station is at Alton, approximately 5 miles (8.0 km) away.

== History ==
=== Ancient ===
The village name has been spelt in different ways over the centuries, including Bradanleag (10th century), Bradelie (11th century), Bradelega (12th century) and Bradelegh (13th century). According to a charter made in 909, King Edward the Elder confirmed that Frithstan, the Bishop of Winchester, had possession of five hides in Bradley. At the time of the Domesday Survey in 1086, however, Bradley was part of the manor of Overton and continued to be listed under Overton until the 11th century. By 1167, Bradley became a separate manor and passed through the ownership of many different families. In 1242, Henry de Bradley, possibly a descendant of the manor's first owner, exchanged three virgates of land in Bradley for 41 acres (17 ha) of land in nearby Ellisfield with Geoffrey des Roches, the nephew of Peter des Roches, Bishop of Winchester. Geoffrey died ten years later, although his wife Emma, the daughter of William Fitz Roger, outlived him, and in 1260 half a virgate of land in the village was transferred to her uncle, Roger Fitz Roger. After Roger's death, the manor of Bradley was then transferred to Martin des Roches, the son and heir of Geoffrey and Emma, and then upon his death in 1277 was passed again to his brother Hugh.

=== Medieval to 21st century ===
A map showing Bradley and surrounding area in 1897. At the time the parish was not independent.

Hugh des Roches was succeeded by his son and heir Sir John des Roches, along with his wife Joan, who in 1338 left future ownership to their daughters Alice and Mary (the latter being the wife of John de Borhunte). Alice died without heirs while Joan des Roches, who outlived her husband, was temporarily holding the manor, and upon her death in 1361 Bradley was passed to her widowed daughter Mary, who almost immediately married Sir Bernard Brocas afterwards. Sir Bernard obtained a grant which gave him the lands of the village in 1363, and died in 1395, leaving his son and heir Sir Bernard to inherit the manor. Although the younger Sir Bernard was executed at Tyburn for treason at the accession of Henry IV, the land was not forfeited and remained in the Brocas family until 1621, until it was leased to Thomas Taylor for 200 years.

In 1629 the manor was taken into the hands of the King James I for a debt of £1,001 (equivalent to £224,208 in 2025) and leased by him to Sir Kenelm Digby and Sir John Savage. After the death of Savage, the manor of Bradley was divided into ten-twelfths; one-twelfth was transferred to John's son and heir Edward, ten-twelfths were held by Sir Pexall Brocas and the remaining twelfth by Francis Cotton, son-in-law of Brocas. In 1711, the manor was passed to Anthony Henley, who was then succeeded by his brother Robert Henley, 1st Earl of Northington and Viscount Henley in 1764. Robert's son, Robert Henley, 2nd Earl of Northington, died unmarried in 1786, thus leaving his three sisters as heirs. Bradley was then passed down the next year to William Drewe, a merchant from London. After Drewe's death in 1772, his will included Bradley to his son John, upon whose death in 1829 was sold to a Mr Rumbold and was once again passed by sale to Mr H. King, who was succeeded by his son Mr J. H. King. The latter sold the estate in 1877 to Harry Chichester, 2nd Baron Templemore, from whom it was purchased by Mr H. J. Hope in 1887. Mr. Hope died in 1905, and his widow was the last recorded owner of Bradley's estate as of 1905.

In 1870–72, the Imperial Gazetteer of England and Wales by John Marius Wilson described Bradley as:

... a parish in Basingstoke district, Hants; 6 miles WNW of Alton r. station, and 6½ S of Basingstoke. Post Town, Preston-Candover, under Micheldever station. Acres, 960. Real property, £860. Pop., 106. Houses, 25. The property is divided among a few. The living is a rectory in the diocese of Winchester. Value, £250.* Patron, E. Rumbold, Esq. The church is good; and there are charities £20.

Until the late 19th century, Bradley was a detached part of Overton. The parish boundaries of the village have been slightly altered since 1913, with Bradley Wood being cut down in order to widen a lane linking the centre of the village to Burkham. Some parts of the parish's eastern boundary was ceded to Bentworth around this time. A boarding kennel for dogs and cats named Gay Dogs opened in the village in the 1960s. Aside from a large solar energy farm constructed near the boundary to Bentworth in 2014, there have been no contemporary developments in the village.

== Geography ==
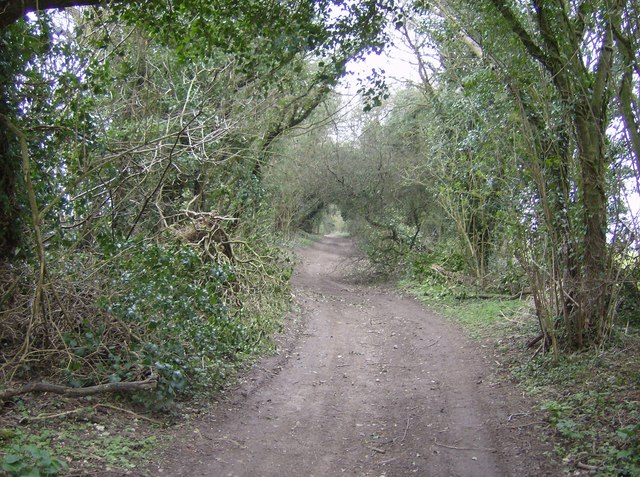
A track leading into the interior of Down Wood.

Bradley lies in the extreme south-eastern corner of the Basingstoke and Deane district of Hampshire in South East England. Although its nearest town is Alton, which lies 5.4 miles (8.7 km) to the south-east, Basingstoke is situated 6.6 miles (10.6 km) to the north. The parish covers an area of 975 acres (395 ha) and has a spot height of 170 metres (560 ft) above sea level. From 1905, the landscape was well wooded and contained 149 acres (60 ha) of woods and plantations as compared with only 3.5 acres (1.4 ha) of fertile land and a further 9 acres (3.6 ha) of permanent grass. Since 1960, much of Bradley Wood has been cut down with the remainder being transferred into the Home Farm Woodland Trust park, in Bentworth. Woods in the area include Preston Oak Hills, Brick Kiln Copse, Down Wood, Bradley Wood, and the Coombe Plantation. The parish contains no hamlets, and much of it borders Bentworth.

=== Climate ===
Due to its location in south central England and its proximity to the sea, the average maximum temperature in January is 7.2 °C (45 °F) with the average minimum being 1.6 °C (35 °F). The average maximum temperature in July is 21.9 °C (71 °F), with the average minimum being 12.5 °C (55 °F). The village gets around 755 millimetres (29.7 in) of rain a year, with a minimum of 1 mm (0.04 in) of rain reported on 103 days a year.

Climate data for Odiham weather station (nearest to Bradley), Odiham, elevation: 9 metres (30 feet) (1981–2010)
Month	Jan	Feb	Mar	Apr	May	Jun	Jul	Aug	Sep	Oct	Nov	Dec	Year
Mean daily maximum °C (°F)	7.2 (45.0)	7.4 (45.3)	10.3 (50.5)	13.0 (55.4)	16.6 (61.9)	19.5 (67.1)	21.9 (71.4)	21.6 (70.9)	18.5 (65.3)	14.4 (57.9)	10.3 (50.5)	7.4 (45.3)	14.1 (57.4)
Mean daily minimum °C (°F)	1.6 (34.9)	1.3 (34.3)	3.0 (37.4)	4.4 (39.9)	7.5 (45.5)	10.4 (50.7)	12.5 (54.5)	12.4 (54.3)	10.2 (50.4)	7.4 (45.3)	4.2 (39.6)	1.8 (35.2)	6.4 (43.5)
Average precipitation mm (inches)	77.8 (3.06)	56.0 (2.20)	54.8 (2.16)	52.6 (2.07)	52.2 (2.06)	48.5 (1.91)	50.2 (1.98)	52.1 (2.05)	61.8 (2.43)	87.2 (3.43)	83.9 (3.30)	78.5 (3.09)	755.5 (29.74)
Average precipitation days	12.2	9.8	10.5	9.5	9.5	8.6	8.4	8.6	8.9	11.7	11.7	11.5	120.9
Source: Met Office

== Demography ==
According to the 2011, census the village had a population of 202 people, of which 38.4% of them were in full-time employment, slightly higher than the national average of 37.7%, and 11.6% were self-employed. Only six people were unemployed, which matches the national average of 4.30%, and 22 people (15.9%) were retired, slightly higher than the national average of 13.4%. In addition, the parish contains 92 households with an average size of 2.2 people.

Population growth in the parish of Bradley since 1801

Year	Population	±%
1801	96	—
1811	103	+7.3%
1821	100	−2.9%
1831	103	+3.0%

Year	Population	±%
1841	125	+21.4%
1851	122	−2.4%
1881	75	−38.5%
1891	69	−8.0%

Year	Population	±%
1901	63	−8.7%
1911	82	+30.2%
1921	79	−3.7%
1931	53	−32.9%

Year	Population	±%
1951	51	−3.8%
1961	73	+43.1%
2001	197	+169.9%
2011	202	+2.5%

Source: A Vision of Britain through Time

== Governance ==
The village falls under the Basingstoke parliament constituency, represented in the House of Commons by Labour MP Luke Murphy since 2024. In County Council elections, Hampshire is divided into 75 electoral divisions that return a total of 78 councillors. Bradley is in the Candovers, Oakley and Overton Division.

== Notable landmarks ==
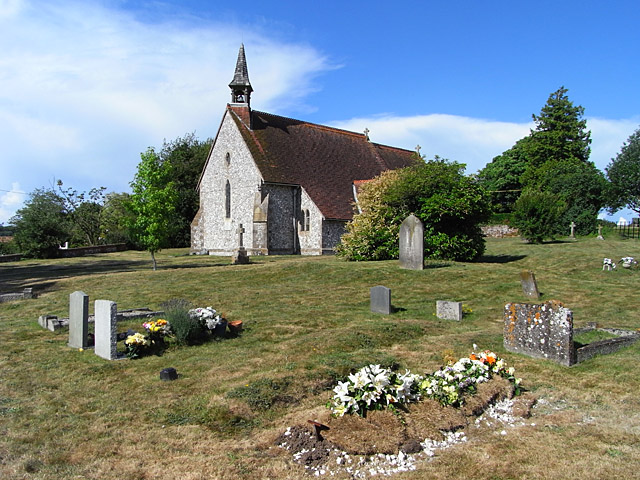
Church of All Saints facing from the south.

The parish contains a total of seven Grade II listed buildings and one Grade II* listed building—the Church of All Saints. Some of the oldest parts of the church date from the 13th century, although the structure was virtually rebuilt afresh in 1877. The church roof consists of red tiles with a small broach spire and a wooden turret. The walls are made of flint with stone dressed buttresses and the windows date from the Restoration period. Other listed buildings in the vicinity include Southwood Farmhouse, Manor Farmhouse and the Upper Farmhouse. Southwood Farmhouse is two storeys high and dates from the 18th century. Its walls are made of red brick with cambered floor openings and its roof is steeply tiled. Manor Farmhouse lies to the south of the village and consists of a near-identical design with Southwood Farmhouse, although it was probably constructed in the early 19th century. The Upper Farmhouse lies in the centre of the village and is a house of mixed periods. The building itself dates from the 17th century, though expansions were made in the 18th and 19th centuries. The house has interior framing and a Victorian lighting system. Its taller expansions were made in the 18th century, and in between the expansions lies a 19th-century gable with a brick porch at its north side.

The rectory is a Grade II listed building and stands opposite the village pond. A building of several periods, the rectory was first built in the 17th century although includes 18th and 19th century additions. The building consists of two storeys with an exposed timber-framed core, with taller attachments at the south. A tiled roof is hipped at the north end and its walls consist of red brick with Flemish bond. A K6 telephone box beside the village pond is also Grade II listed. The telephone box was designed in 1935 by Sir Giles Gilbert Scott and was made by various contractors.
