= 1941 Petersfield by-election =

UK Parliamentary by-election

The 1941 Petersfield by-election was held on 22 February 1941. The by-election was held due to the appointment as Governor of Burma of the incumbent Conservative MP, Reginald Dorman-Smith. It was won by the unopposed Conservative candidate George Jeffreys.
