= Mark Jeffreys, 2nd Baron Jeffreys =

British politician (1932-1986)

Mark George Christopher Jeffreys, 2nd Baron Jeffreys (2 February 1932 – 13 February 1986) was a British peer, a member of the House of Lords from 1960 until his death.

The only son of Captain Christopher John Darell Jeffreys (1907–1940), of the Grenadier Guards, who was killed in action during the Second World War, and his wife Lady Rosemary Beatrice Agar, a younger daughter of Sidney James Agar, 4th Earl of Normanton, he was educated at Eton College and the Royal Military Academy Sandhurst, then was commissioned into the Grenadier Guards, rising to the rank of major. In 1960, he succeeded to the peerage of Baron Jeffreys on the death of his grandfather. He was a member of White's.

In 1956, Jeffreys married firstly Sarah Annabelle Mary, only daughter of Major Henry Claude Lyon Garnett, and they had two sons (Christopher Henry Mark, 1957, and Alexander Charles Darell, 1959) and two daughters (Laura, 1961, and Rose Amanda, 1962), before divorcing in 1967; secondly, that year, Anne Louise, daughter of Sir Shirley Worthington-Evans, 2nd Baronet, and they had one daughter, Sophie Louise, born in 1972; thirdly, in 1981, Suzanne, daughter of James Stead.

Jeffreys died on 13 February 1986, aged 54.

In 1996, his daughter Sophie married the philosopher Roger Scruton.
