= American Volunteer Group =

Volunteer air units organized by the United States government

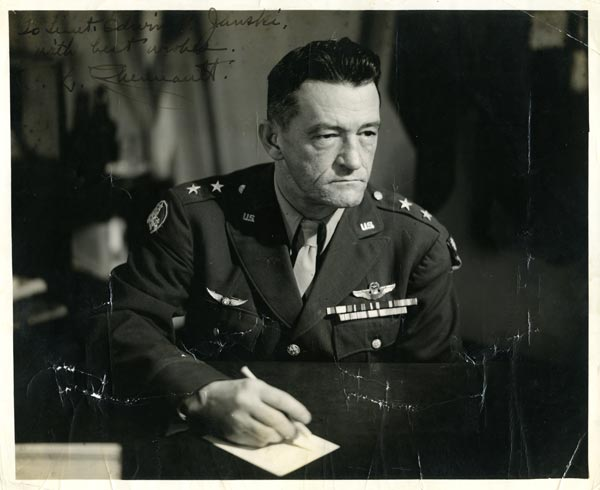
Claire Lee Chennault (1893–1958) was instrumental in the implementation of the AVGs

The American Volunteer Groups were volunteer air units organized by the United States government to aid the Nationalist government of China against Japan in the Second Sino-Japanese War. The only unit to actually see combat was the 1st AVG, popularly known as the Flying Tigers.

To aid the Nationalist government of China and to put pressure on Japan, President Franklin Roosevelt in April 1941 authorized the creation of a clandestine "Special Air Unit" consisting of three combat groups equipped with American aircraft and staffed by aviators and technicians to be recruited from the U.S. Army, Navy and Marine Corps for service in China. The program was fleshed out in the winter of 1940–1941 by Claire Lee Chennault, then an air advisor to the Chinese Nationalist leader Chiang Kai-shek, and Lauchlin Currie, a young economist in the Roosevelt White House. They envisioned a small air corps of 500 combat aircraft, although in the end, the number was reduced to 200 fighters and 66 light bombers.

== 1st AVG (Flying Tigers) ==
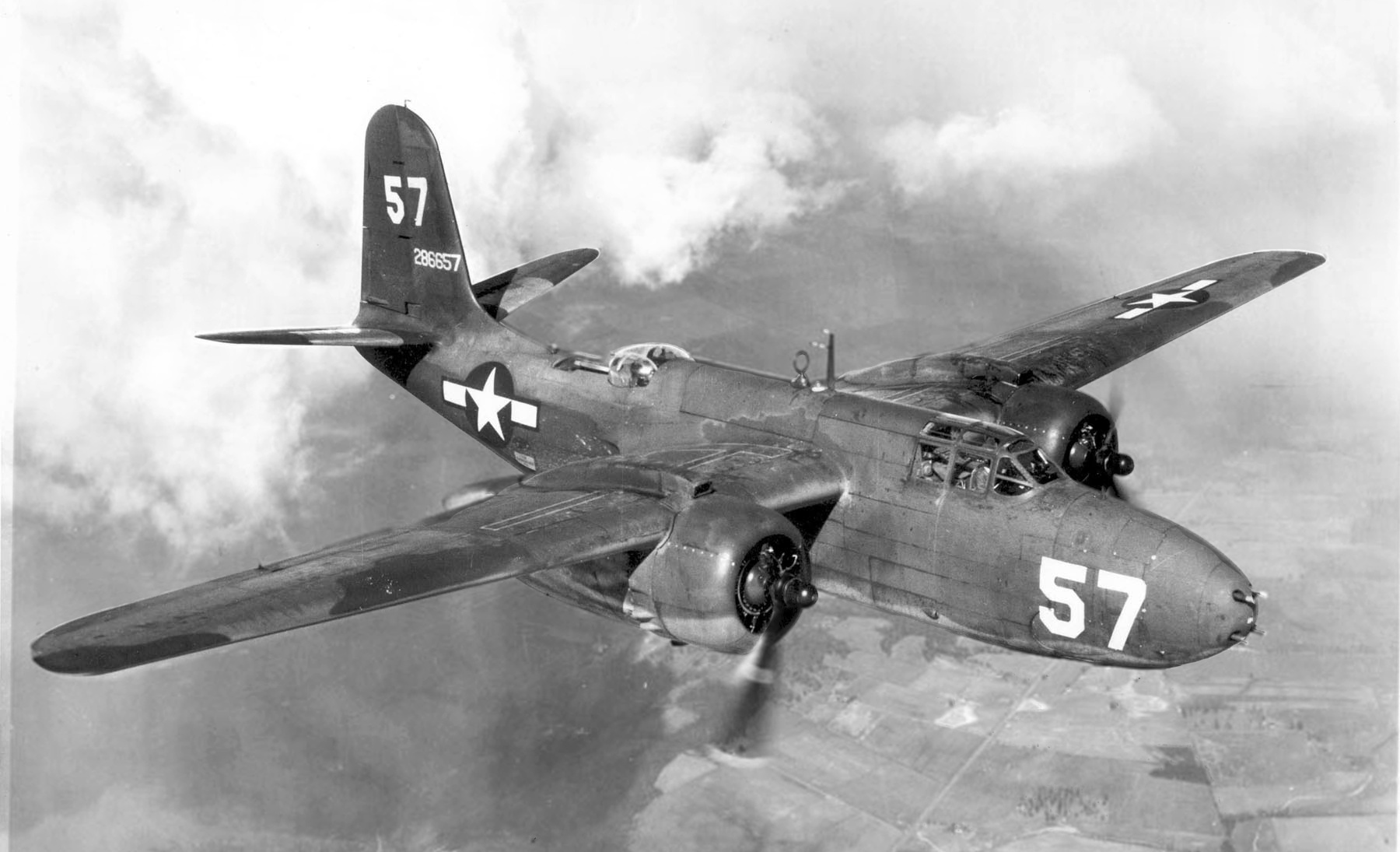
Douglas A-20 Havoc of the United States Army Air Forces

The 1st American Volunteer Group were recruited starting on 15 April 1941, when an unpublished executive order was signed by President Roosevelt. One hundred Curtiss P-40Bs were obtained from Curtiss-Wright, by convincing the British Government to take a later more advanced batch of P-40s in exchange. The group assembled at RAF Mingaladon in Burma by November 1941 for training, where it was organized into three squadrons and established a headquarters. After the Japanese invasion of Burma, the AVG fought alongside the Royal Air Force in defense of Rangoon Under Chennault's command, the Flying Tigers became famous in the defense of Burma and China. It was disbanded and replaced by the United States Army Air Forces' (AAF) 23rd Fighter Group in July 1942, with only five of its pilots choosing to continue with the AAF.

== 2nd AVG ==
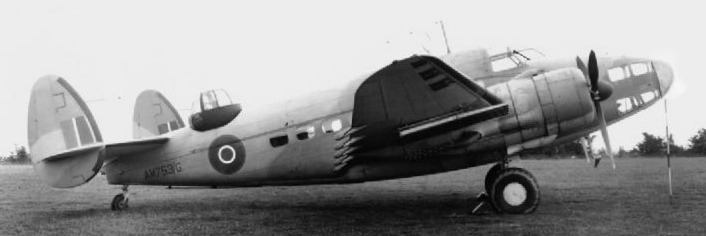
The Lockheed Hudson (seen in RAF use) was an American-built light bomber and coastal reconnaissance aircraft

In the fall of 1941, the 2nd American Volunteer Group was equipped with 33 Lockheed Hudson (A-28) and 33 Douglas DB-7 (A-20) bombers originally built for Britain but acquired by the U.S. Army as part of the Lend-Lease program passed earlier in the year. The Central Aircraft Manufacturing Company, fronting for the Chinese and American governments, recruited 82 pilots and 359 ground crew from the U.S. Army in the fall of 1941 and an undetermined number, including one pilot, sailed for Asia aboard Bloemfontein of the Java-Pacific line. Other pilots reported to San Francisco and were scheduled to depart aboard the Lockheed Hudsons on 10 December. The Douglas DB-7s were to have gone by freighter to Africa, to be assembled and ferried to China but the 7 December 1941, attack on Pearl Harbor caused the program to be aborted. The vessels at sea were diverted to Australia, the aircraft were taken back into American service and most of the personnel rejoined the military, either in Australia or in the U.S.

== 3rd AVG ==
The 3rd AVG was to have been a fighter group like the 1st. Because the 2nd AVG had been recruited from the U.S. Army, recruiting for the 3rd was to have been limited to the U.S. Navy and Marine Corps, starting in the early months of 1942. These plans too were abandoned as a result of the U.S. entry into World War II.

== See also ==
- Arthur Chin, a member of the original volunteer group of Chinese-American fighter pilots; the first American ace of WWII
- Soviet Volunteer Group
- Korean-American Volunteer Group
