= Baron Jeffreys =

Extinct barony in the Peerage of England

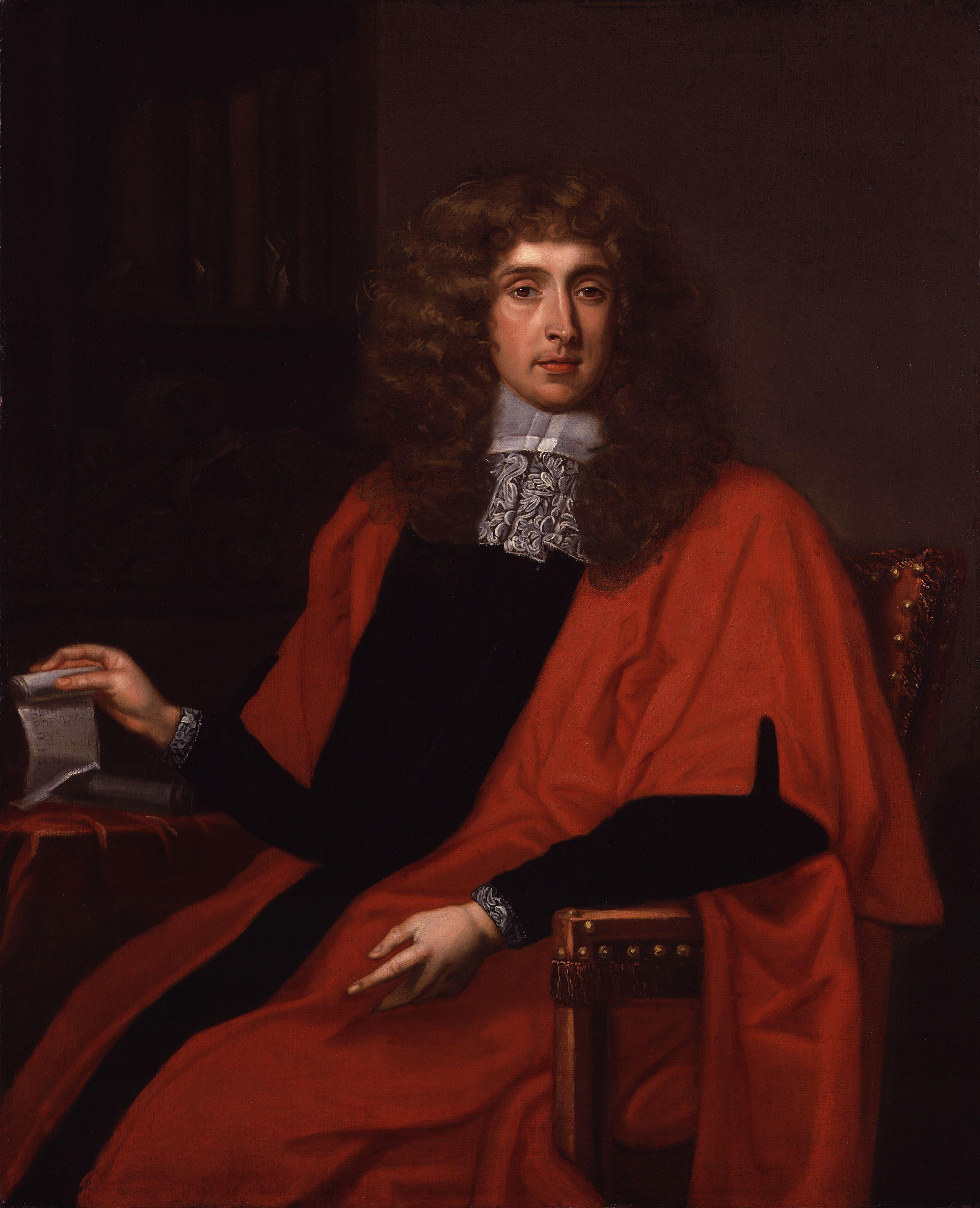
George Jeffreys, 1st Baron Jeffreys (of the first creation)

Baron Jeffreys is a title that has been created twice, once in the Peerage of England and once in the Peerage of the United Kingdom. The first creation came in the Peerage of England on 16 May 1685 when the lawyer and later Lord Chancellor, Sir George Jeffreys, 1st Baronet, was made Baron Jeffreys, of Wem. He had already been created a Baronet, of Bulstrode in the County of Buckingham, in the Baronetage of England in 1681. The titles became extinct on the death of his son, the second Baron, in 1702, who had no male heir: his daughter, the writer Henrietta Fermor, married the 1st Earl of Pomfret. The estates passed to Jeffreys's widow, Lady Charlotte Herbert, who later remarried as Viscountess Windsor.

The next creation came in the Peerage of the United Kingdom in 1952 when General George Jeffreys was made Baron Jeffreys, of Burkham in the County of Southampton. He had also served as Conservative Member of Parliament for Petersfield. Jeffreys's father Arthur Frederick Jeffreys had previously represented Basingstoke in Parliament, and had been admitted to the Privy Council in 1902. Lord Jeffreys was succeeded by his grandson, the second Baron, his son and heir Captain Christopher John Darell Jeffreys (1907–1940) having been killed in action in May 1940. As of 2017 the title is held by the second Baron's eldest son, the third Baron, who succeeded in 1986.

The family seat is Bottom Farm, near Grantham, Lincolnshire.

== Baron Jeffreys, first creation ==
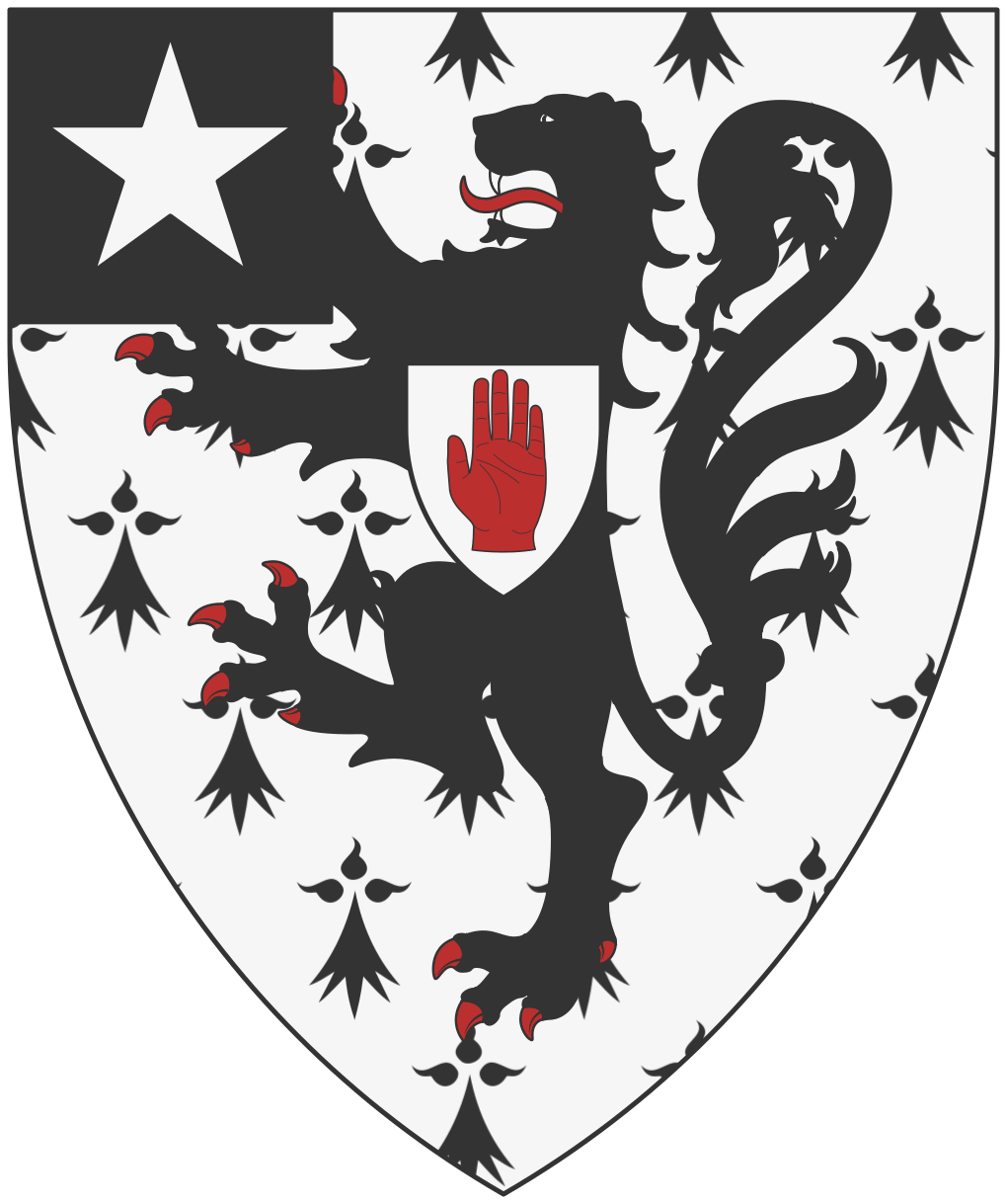
The coat of arms of Jeffreys of Bulstrode, Baron Jeffereys, Baronets.

=== Jeffrey baronets, of Bulstrode (1681) ===
- George Jeffreys, 1st Baronet (1645–1689)

=== Baron Jeffreys (1685) ===
- George Jeffreys, 1st Baron Jeffreys (1645–1689)
- John Jeffreys, 2nd Baron Jeffreys (1673–1702)

== Baron Jeffreys, second creation (1952) ==
- George Darell Jeffreys, 1st Baron Jeffreys (1878–1960)
  - Capt. Christopher John Darell Jeffreys (1907–1940)
- Mark George Christopher Jeffreys, 2nd Baron Jeffreys (1932–1986)
- Christopher Henry Mark Jeffreys, 3rd Baron Jeffreys (born 1957)

The heir apparent is the present holder's son, the Hon. Arthur Mark Henry Jeffreys (born 1989).

=== Line of succession ===
Line of succession
- Gen. George Darell Jeffreys, 1st Baron Jeffreys (1878–1960)
  - Capt. Christopher John Darell Jeffreys (1907–1940)
    - Mark George Christopher Jeffreys, 2nd Baron Jeffreys (1932–1986)
      - Christopher Henry Mark Jeffreys, 3rd Baron Jeffreys (born 1957)
        - (1) Hon. Arthur Mark Henry Jeffreys (born 1989)
      - (2) Hon. Alexander Charles Darell Jeffreys (born 1959)
    - Hon. George Christian Darell Jeffreys (1939–2010)
      - (3) Christopher George Hugo Jeffreys (born 1984)

=== Coat of arms ===
Coat of arms of the Barons Jeffreys (second creation)
Crest On a wreath Ermine and Sable a demi-lion Or grasping with the dexter claw a wreath of laurel Vert. Escutcheon Ermine a lion rampant Sable and a canton Sable. Supporters On either side a lion regardant Sable crowned with an ancient crown Or and charged on the shoulder with two swords in saltire point upwards Gold. Motto Pod Dawn O DDVW (Every Gift From God)

== Title succession chart ==
Title succession chart, Barons Jeffreys (both creations)

John Jeffreys; 1608–1691
Baron Jeffreys (first creation); Baronet (of Bulstrode)
George Jeffreys; 1st Baron Jeffreys; 1st Baronet; 1645–1689	Rev. James Jeffreys; 1649–1689
John Jeffreys; 2nd Baron Jeffreys; 2nd Baronet; 1673–1702	John Jeffreys; 1690–1741
Barony and baronetcy extinct
John Jeffreys; 1718–1798
Rev. John Jeffreys; 1771–1840
Arthur Jeffreys; 1811–1861
Rt Hon. Arthur F. Jeffreys; 1848–1906
Baron Jeffreys (second creation)
Maj Gen. George Jeffreys; 1st Baron Jeffreys; 1878–1960
Capt. Christopher Jeffreys; 1907–1940
Mark Jeffreys; 2nd Baron Jeffreys; 1932–1986
Christopher Jeffreys; 3rd Baron Jeffreys born 1957
Hon. Arthur Jeffreys born 1989
