= 19th (Western) Division =

Infantry division of the British Army during World War I

- 19th (Western) Division Insignia
- Active: 1914— 1919
- Country: United Kingdom
- Branch: British Army
- Type: Infantry
- Size: Division
- Engagements: World War I

The 19th (Western) Division was an infantry division of the British Army, part of Kitchener's Army, formed in the Great War.

== Formation history ==
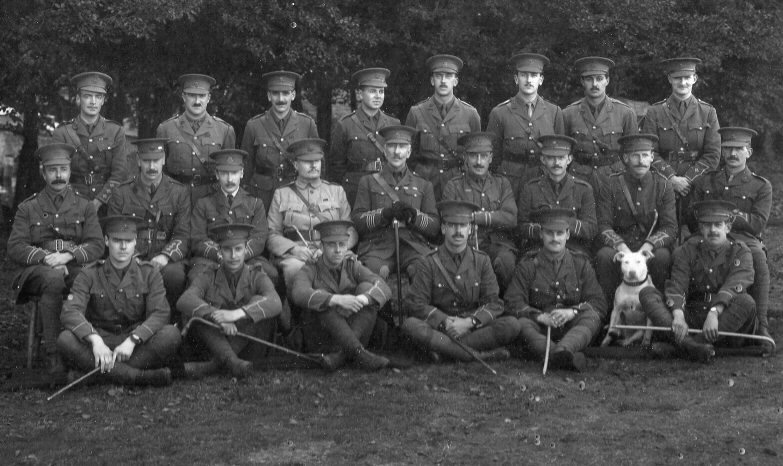
Officers of the 10th (Service) Battalion, Worcestershire Regiment, at Perham Down, Wiltshire, November 1914.

The 19th (Western) Division was created under Western Command in September 1914, shortly after the outbreak of the Great War, from men volunteering for Lord Kitchener's New Armies. The division, whose first commander was Major General Charles Fasken, a 59-year old Indian Army officer brought out of retirement, was formed as part of Kitchener's Second New Army (K2) and, in common with most other newly-raised Kitchener units, there was a severe shortage of trained officers and NCO's to train the men, alongside a lack of modern equipment, training facilities and billets. However, by June 1915, training had progressed well and the division was sent to the Western Front, where it remained for the rest of the war.

== Order of battle ==
The 19th (Western) Division was constituted as follows during the war:

56th Brigade

- 7th (Service) Battalion, King's Own (Royal Lancaster Regiment) (disbanded February 1918)
- 7th (Service) Battalion, East Lancashire Regiment (disbanded February 1918)
- 7th (Service) Battalion, South Lancashire Regiment (disbanded February 1918)
- 7th (Service) Battalion, Loyal North Lancashire Regiment (disbanded February 1918)
- 4th (Extra Reserve) Battalion, King's (Liverpool Regiment) (joined 3 December 1915, left 15 December 1915)
- 56th Machine Gun Company, Machine Gun Corps (joined 14 February 1916, moved to 19th Machine Gun Battalion 14 February 1918)
- 56th Trench Mortar Battery (joined 17 June 1916, broken up 5 February 1918, reformed 6 March 1918)
- 9th (Service) Battalion, Cheshire Regiment (joined February 1918)
- 1/4th Battalion, King's (Shropshire Light Infantry) (joined February 1918)
- 8th (Service) Battalion, Prince of Wales's (North Staffordshire Regiment) (joined February 1918)

57th Brigade

- 10th (Service) Battalion, Royal Warwickshire Regiment
- 8th (Service) Battalion, Gloucestershire Regiment
- 10th (Service) Battalion, Worcestershire Regiment (until June 1918)
- 8th (Service) Battalion, Prince of Wales's (North Staffordshire Regiment) (until February 1918)
- 57th Machine Gun Company, Machine Gun Corps (joined 14 February 1916, moved to 19th Machine Gun Battalion 14 February 1918)
- 57th Trench Mortar Battery (joined 15 June 1916)
- 3rd Battalion, Worcestershire Regiment (joined June 1918)

58th Brigade

- 9th (Service) Battalion, Cheshire Regiment (left February 1918)
- 9th (Service) Battalion, Royal Welsh Fusiliers
- 5th (Service) Battalion, South Wales Borderers (left December 1914)
- 9th (Service) Battalion, Welsh Regiment
- 6th (Service) Battalion, Duke of Edinburgh's (Wiltshire Regiment) (from December 1915 until June 1918)
- 58th Machine Gun Company, Machine Gun Corps (joined 14 February 1916, moved to 19th Machine Gun Battalion 14 February 1918)
- 58th Trench Mortar Battery (joined 15 June 1916)
- 2nd Battalion, Duke of Edinburgh's (Wiltshire Regiment) (joined May 1918)

Divisional Troops

- 6th (Service) Battalion, Duke of Edinburgh's (Wiltshire Regiment) (left December 1914)
- 5th (Service) Battalion, South Wales Borderers (joined as provisional Pioneer battalion December 1914, conversion completed February 1915)
- 13th Motor Machine Gun Battery (joined 14 July 1915, left 7 March 1916)
- 246th Machine Gun Company, Machine Gun Corps (joined 19 July 1917, moved into 19 Machine Gun Battalion 14 February 1918)
- 19th Battalion, Machine Gun Corps (formed 14 February 1918)

Divisional Mounted Troops

- C Squadron, Queen's Own Yorkshire Dragoons (joined 26 June 1915, left 21 April 1916)
- 19th Divisional Cyclist Company, Army Cyclist Corps (formed 19 November 1914, left 21 April 1916)

Divisional Artillery

- LXXXVI Brigade, Royal Field Artillery (left 23 January 1917)
- LXXXVII Brigade, Royal Field Artillery
- LXXXVIII Brigade, Royal Field Artillery
- LXXXIX (Howitzer) Brigade, Royal Field Artillery (broken up 8–9 September 1916)
- 19th Divisional Ammunition Column Royal Field Artillery
- 19th Heavy Battery, Royal Garrison Artillery (raised with the division but moved independently to France on 15 July 1915 and joined XXI Brigade, Royal Garrison Artillery)
- W.19 Heavy Trench Mortar Battery, Royal Field Artillery (joined May 1916, disbanded 19 February 1918)
- X.19, Y.19 and Z.19 Medium Mortar Batteries, Royal Field Artillery (formed by May 1916; on 18 February 1918, Z broken up and batteries reorganised to have 6 x 6-inch weapons each)

Royal Engineers

- 81st Field Company, Royal Engineers
- 82nd Field Company, Royal Engineers
- 94th Field Company, Royal Engineers
- 19th Divisional Signals Company, Royal Engineers

Royal Army Medical Corps

- 57th Field Ambulance, Royal Army Medical Corps
- 58th Field Ambulance, Royal Army Medical Corps
- 59th Field Ambulance, Royal Army Medical Corps
- 36th Sanitary Section, Royal Army Medical Corps (left 9 July 1917)

Other Divisional Troops

- 19th Divisional Train Army Service Corps (154, 155, 156 and 157 Companies)
- 31st Mobile Veterinary Section Army Veterinary Corps
- 220th Divisional Employment Company (joined 19 July 1917)
- 19th Divisional Motor Ambulance Workshop (absorbed into divisional train 6 April 1916)

== Commanders ==
- Major General Charles Fasken September 1914 — December 1915
- Major General Tom Bridges December 1915 — September 1917
- Major General George Geoffreys September 1917 — February 1919

== Victoria Cross recipients ==
- Second Lieutenant Hugh Colvin, 9th (Service) Battalion, Cheshire Regiment
- Temporary Lieutenant Colonel Adrian Carton de Wiart, commanding the 8th (Service) Battalion, Gloucestershire Regiment
- Acting Captain Eric Dougall, LXXXVIII Brigade, Royal Field Artillery
- Temporary Captain Julian Gribble, 10th (Service) Battalion, Royal Warwickshire Regiment
- Captain Manley James, 8th (Service) Battalion, Gloucestershire Regiment
- Private James Miller, 7th (Service) Battalion, King's Own (Royal Lancaster Regiment)
- Private Thomas Turrall, 10th (Service) Battalion, Worcestershire Regiment
- Lieutenant Thomas Wilkinson, 7th (Service) Battalion, Loyal North Lancashire Regiment

== See also ==
- List of British divisions in World War I
