= Burkham House =

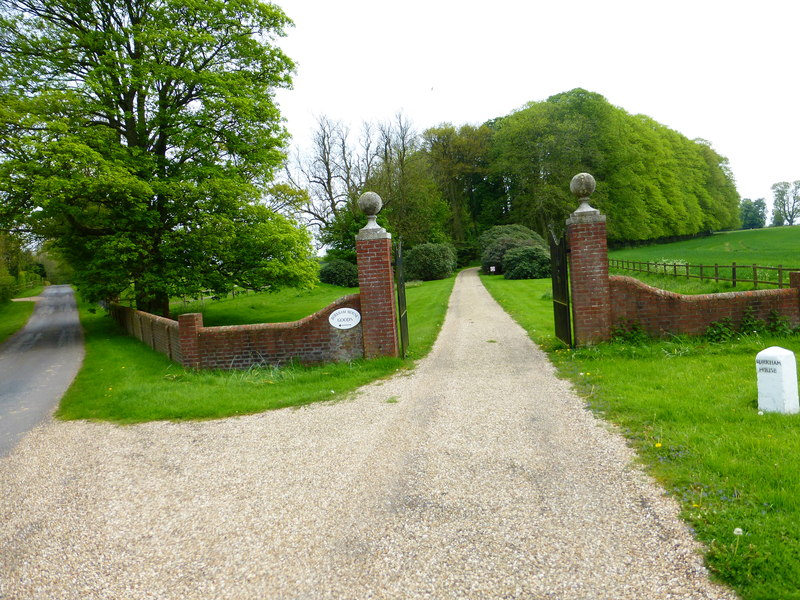
- Entrance

- Location within Hampshire

General information
- Location: Burkham, Hampshire, England
- Coordinates: 51.184320°N 1.07048°W
- Completed: 1316
- Cost: £160

Burkham House is a large country manor situated in the hamlet of Burkham in the parish of Bentworth, Hampshire. It is about 2.7 miles (4.3 km) south of the centre of Bentworth and about 5.4 miles (8.7 km) northwest of Alton, its nearest town

== History ==
The manor itself returns dated 1316. John Daleron held 'Brocham'. In 1590 Robert Hunt acquired the Bentworth Hall from Henry Lord Windsor, and this included the Burkham area. Later, Robert Magewick purchased Burkham for £160. and George Magewick (1647–1736) was described as the owner of Burkham Farm in 1684. In 1748 James Magewick Battin held the manor and was made owner during a 1778 Survey of Hampshire.
