= Bombing of Rangoon in World War II =

Coordinates: 16°47′N 96°10′E

Bombing of Rangoon
- Part of Pacific War
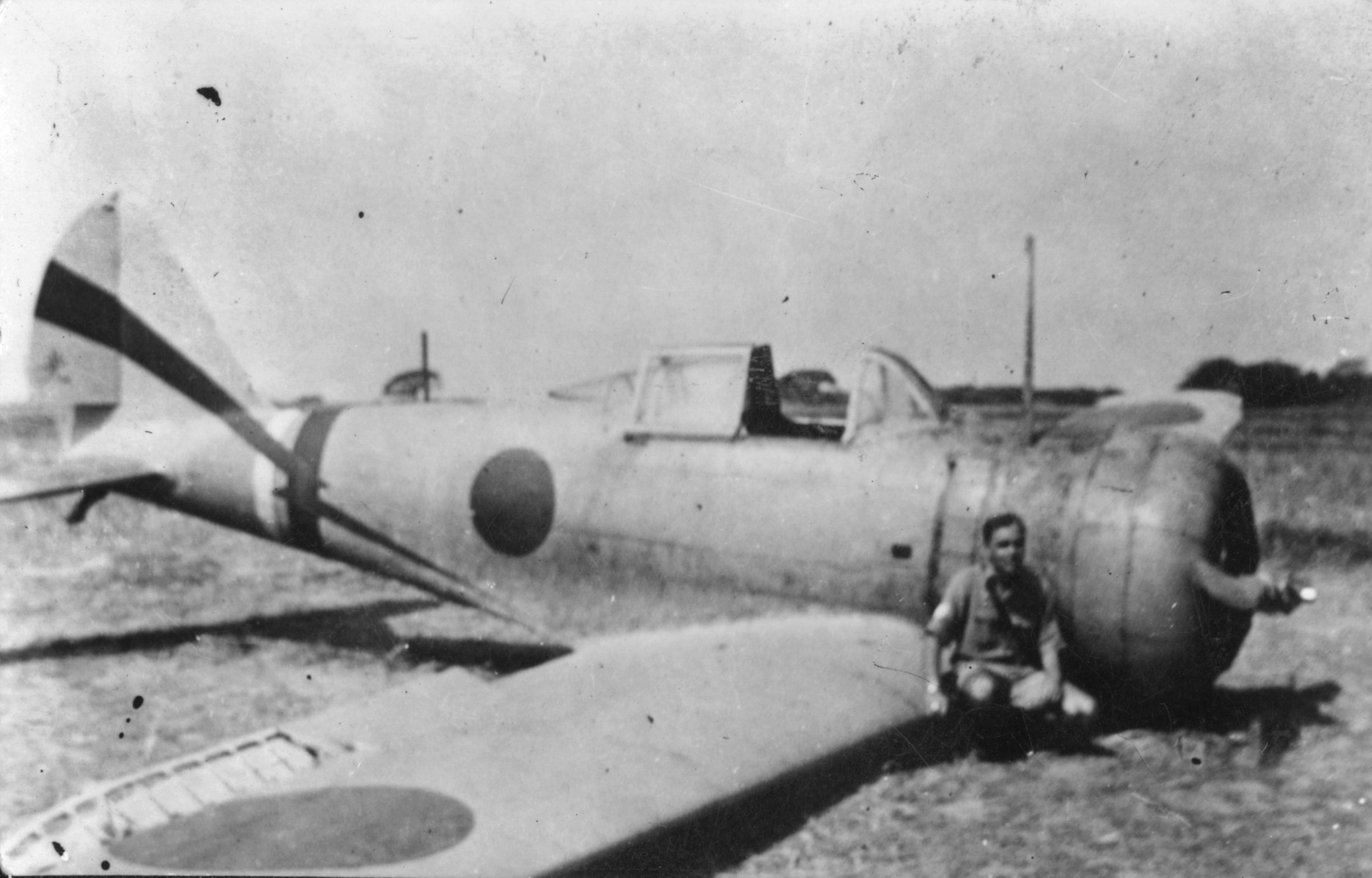
- Nakajima Ki-27 fighter aircraft shot down near Rangoon, 24 January 1942
Date	1941-1942
Location	Rangoon, British Burma

Belligerents
British Empire: (British Raj) British India; (Myanmar) British Burma	Empire of Japan

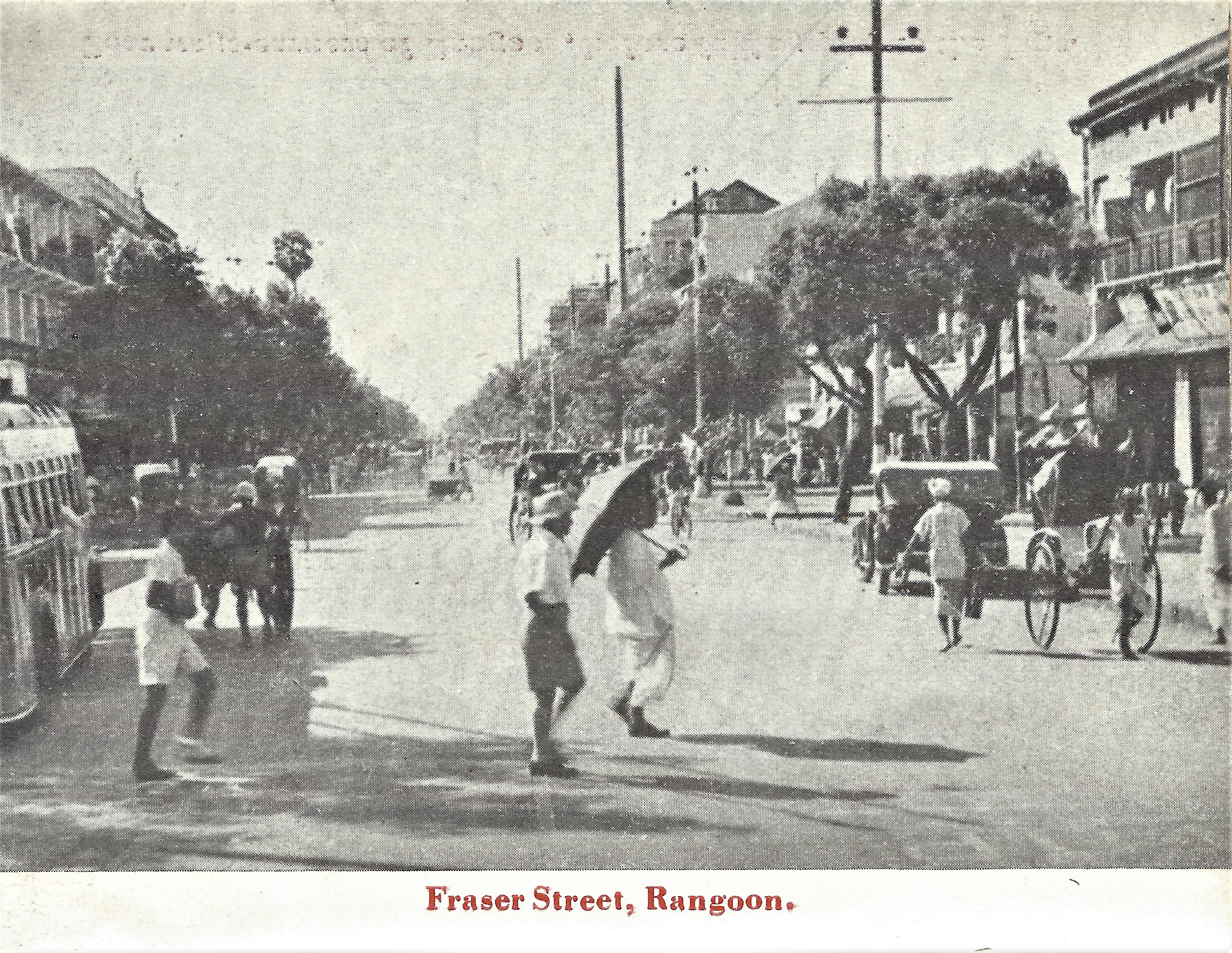
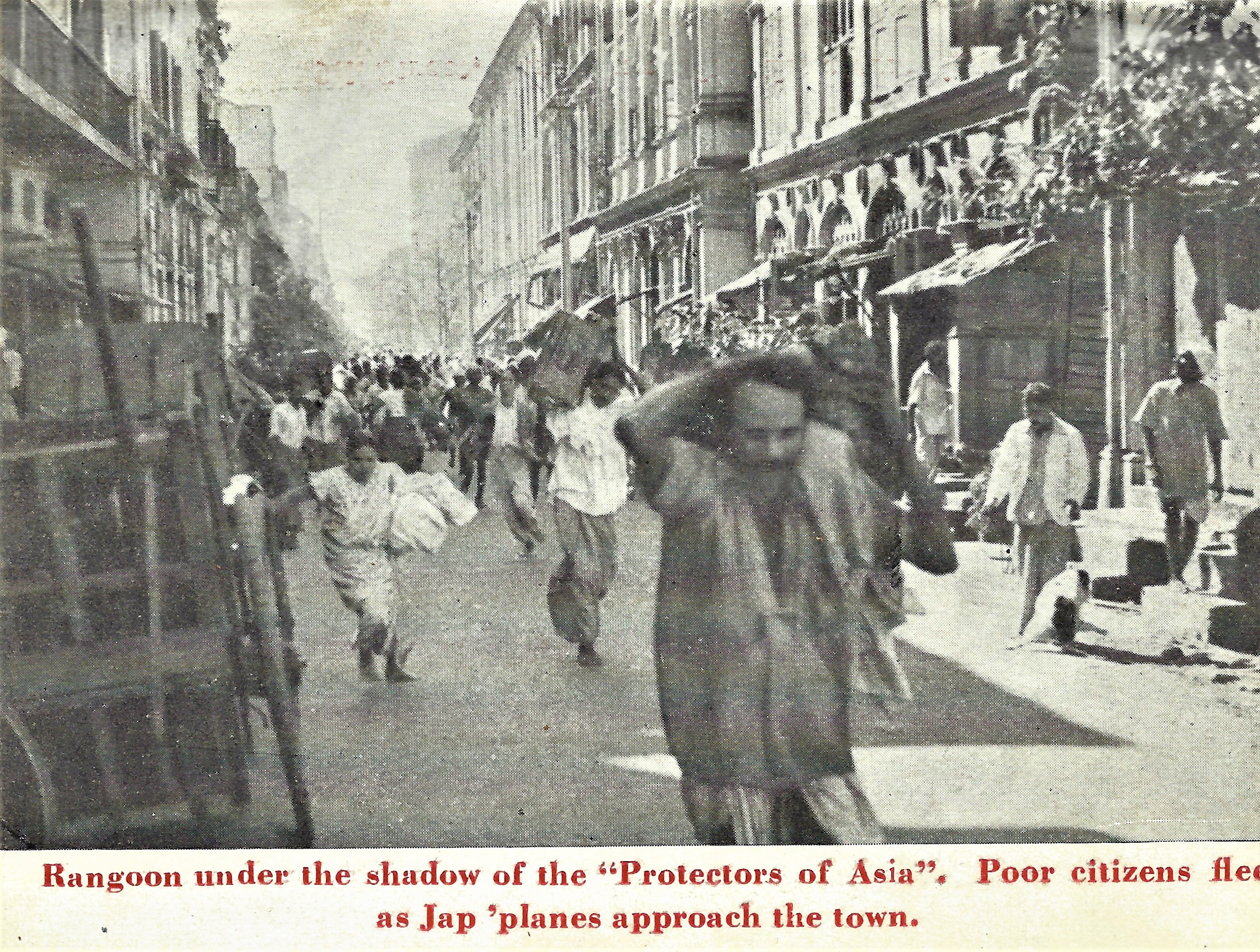
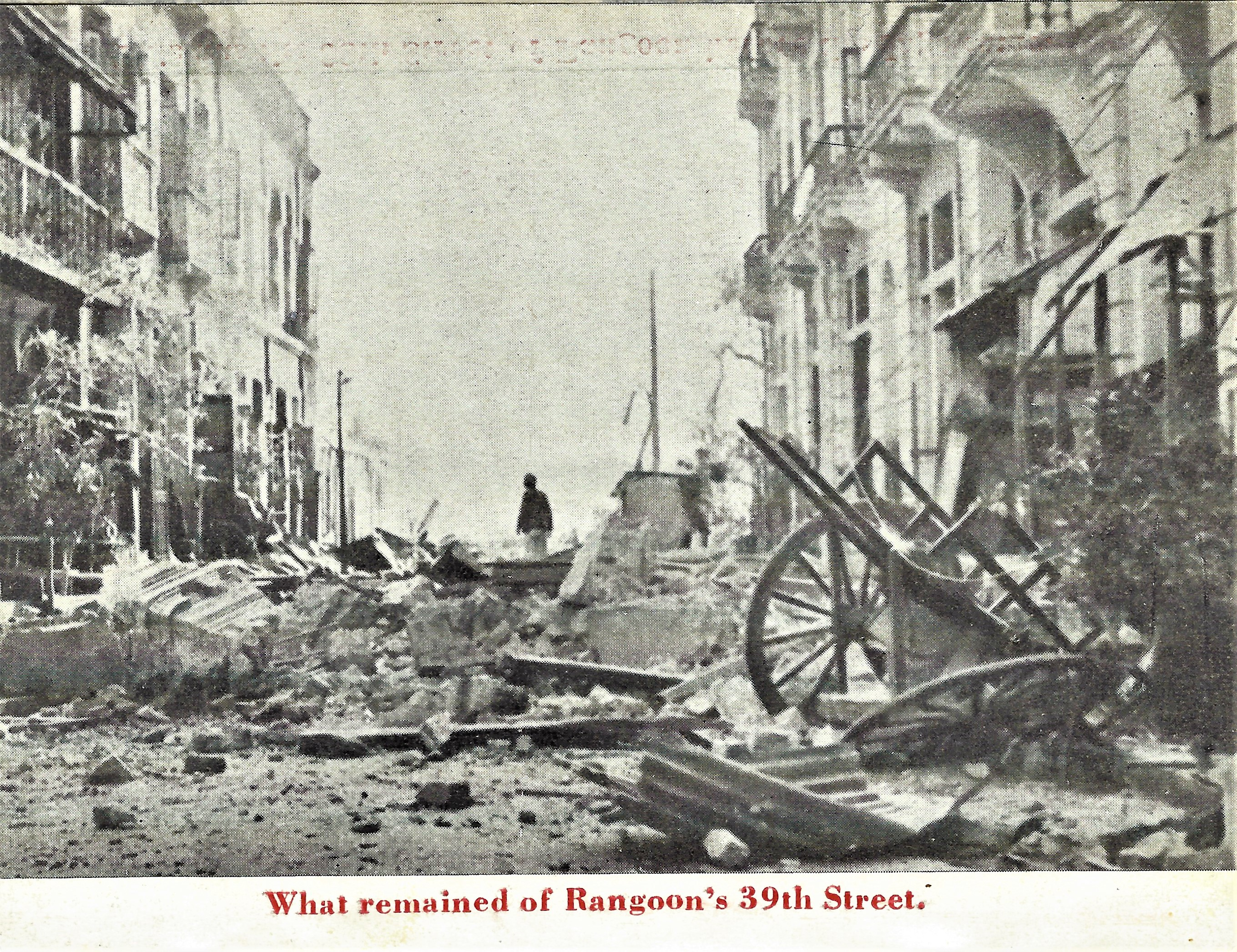
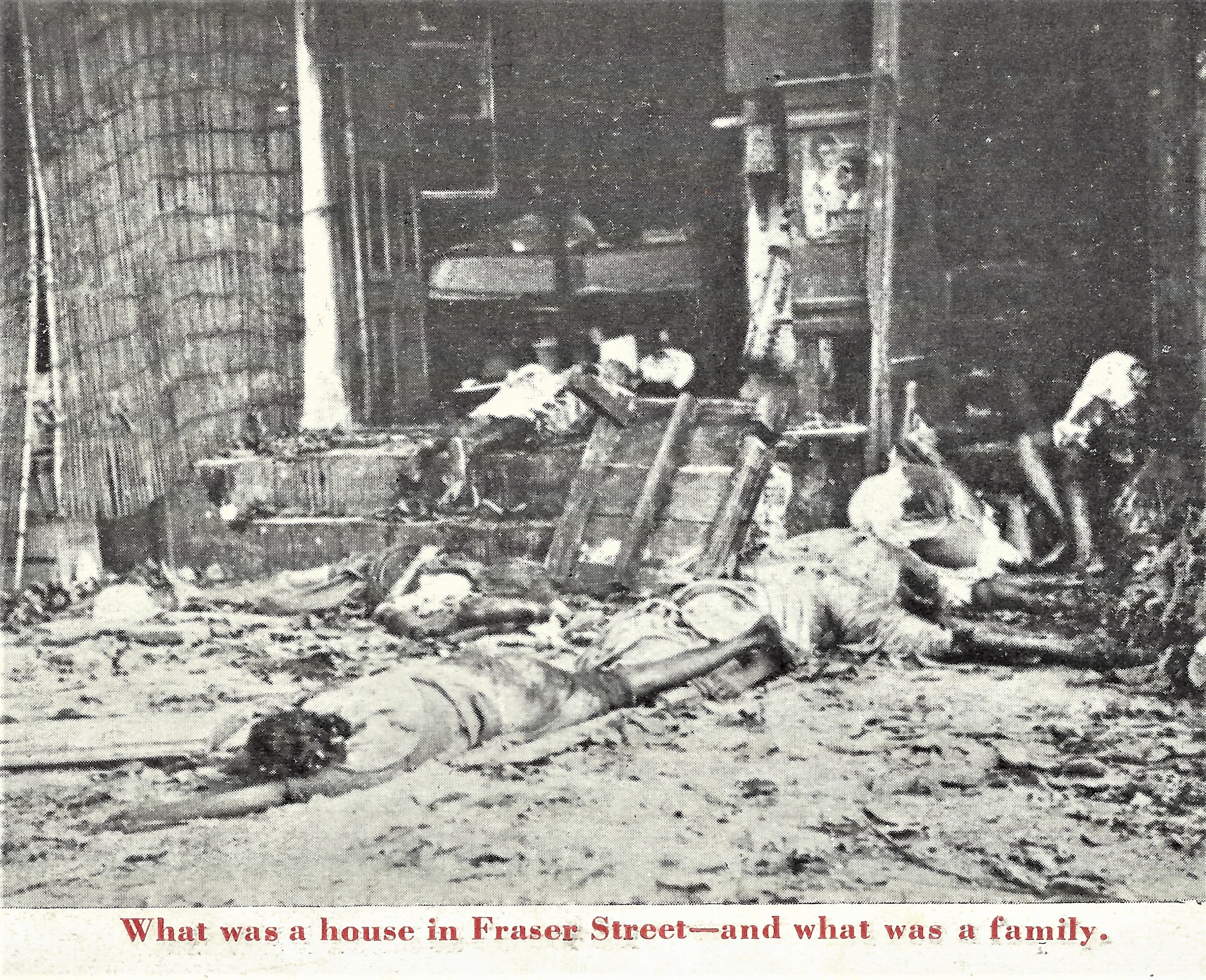
Top: (left) Fraser Street, Rangoon, before the Japanese bombing (right) 39th Street, Rangoon: Poor citizens flee as Japanese planes approach December 1941; Bottom (left) 39th Street, Rangoon: After the Japanese bombing December 1941 (right) Fraser Street, Rangoon: A family killed, their house destroyed, in the Japanese bombing, December 1941

The bombing of Rangoon was a series of air raids conducted by the Imperial Japanese Army Air Service that took place between December 1941 to March 1942 during the Burma Campaign of World War II. The capital city of Rangoon was the first to be attacked after Japan executed air raids on Burma in preparation for its invasion of the country weeks following its declaration of war upon the United States and the United Kingdom on December 8, 1941.

== December 23, 1941 ==
=== Background ===
The air war in southern Burma was about to enter an entirely new phase after Japan executed air raids on Burma in preparation for its invasion of the country. General Michio Sugawara was planning a major bombing raid on Rangoon for December 23. Mingaladon airfield and the downtown districts of Rangoon were to be the principal targets; the Shwedagon Pagoda would provide an excellent navigation mark from the air. Like most pre-World War II airpower theorists, targeting downtown districts would serve as an effort to create terror and panic among the city's inhabitants and demoralize their will to support the war, in hoping that such raid would force them to turn against British colonial leaders.

Eighty bombers and thirty fighters were available for the operation. Most of the bombers were twin-engine Mitsubishi Ki-21 bombers. The Ki-21 was a modern type, carried a large crew and could fly at 300 miles per hour. Three squadrons of Ki-21 bombers would be supported by a squadron of nimble Nakajima Ki-27 fighters - also called a Type 97 fighter - and a squadron of Mitsubishi Ki-30s. The Ki-30 was a light bomber and carried a 600-pound bomb; for armament, it mounted one forward-firing fixed machine gun, and a rear-gunner sat behind the pilot under a greenhouse type canopy.

==== Attack ====
The Japanese squadrons took to the skies from airfields in Thailand and Indochina on the morning of December 23. By the time they arrived over Rangoon, there were few clouds in the air and a light breeze blew from the south, thus allowing them to visually strike at the selected targets. Just before 10 a.m., the operations room at Mingaladon reported two waves of approaching raiders. Once the news came through, the base's fighters were hastily ordered to scramble in order to intercept the enemy bombers. A dozen Curtiss Tomahawks and fifteen Brewster Buffalos of the Royal Air Force and the American Volunteer Group (AVG) took off and began climbing for all the height they could manage in the time available. The Japanese aircraft arrived forty minutes after the first warning. A squadron of twin-engine bombers (62nd Sentai) made for Mingaladon with the slower single-engine fighter-bombers (31st Sentai) and fighters (77th Sentai) swarming behind. The other two squadrons of twin-engine bombers (60th and 98th Sentais) headed towards Rangoon city in a separate stream.

A pair of Buffalos already in the air for a routine patrol was first to attack the bombers heading for Mingaladon. A flight of Tomahawks soon gained sufficient height to attack the incoming Japanese aircraft. From a line astern, the fighters peeled off to rake the bombers with machine gunfire. More Tomahawks joined the battle and pilot Chuck Older forced a bomber out of formation trailing smoke. Another bomber crashed on the waterfront; the gun crew on the American freighter City of Tulsa made a claim, though the falling aircraft was probably already fatally crippled." AVG pilot Hank Gilbert's Tomahawk was shot down by defensive fire from bombers; Gilbert was the AVG's first combat death. Paul Greene bailed out when his Tomahawk went out of control; he was knocked out when he hit the earth and awoke to find he was looking along the gun barrel of a British soldier.

The 62nd Sentai - the Ki-21 squadron that had bombed Mingaladon - lost five bombers out of fifteen in the raid. All of the remaining bombers of the squadron had suffered damage. Meanwhile, a further two squadrons of Japanese twin-engine bombers had headed towards the center of Rangoon. Six Tomahawks were circling over Syriam, downriver of Rangoon, on the look-out for incoming raiders. Before long a well-drilled formation of green camouflaged twin-engine bombers was sighted approaching at 17,000 feet. The leading formation of this wave comprised eighteen bombers of the 98th Sentai; the squadron was commanded by Colonel Shigeki Usui. The Tomahawks attacked in two sections of three aircraft. One Tomahawk was damaged by the air gunners of the bombers and the pilot killed. Two of the bombers were knocked out of formation and shot down in a series of attacks by the American fighters. Three crew bailed out of one of the bombers. The body of a Japanese airman was later recovered beneath the folds of a parachute holding a grenade in the frozen claw of his hand. Several other bombers were damaged in the engagement; Colonel Usui was killed by machine-gun fire sitting in his co-pilot's seat.

Despite this, the bombers managed to inflict much damage to the selected targets. The 62nd Sentai bombed the Mingaladon airfield, damaging a number of aircraft, the operations room, the hangar, and fuel tanks. At the same time, the 98th Sentais concentrated on the city's downtown districts, and the Allied planes only intercepted less than 10 Japanese bombers. 20 minutes after bombing run by the 98th, 27 Japanese bombers of the 60th dropped payloads of bombs into downtown districts without much opposition and headed for home.

High-explosive and incendiary bombs leveled over three-fifths of the wooden-buildings and incinerated many residents; flying glass and collapsing houses caused a stampede that trampled underfoot those who had fallen. An Indian shopkeeper said, "It was (a) pitiable sight to see women with disheveled hair and babes in arms crying and running where their fear-laden whimsies took them...More pathetic were children who clung to running men and women, mistaking them for their parents."

=== Results ===
According to Japanese records, seven Ki-21 bombers were shot down and an additional twin-engine bomber crashed on the return journey during the December 23 raid. Japanese pilots and gunners always bragged that they shot down 41 Allied fighters; Allied combat claims were also excessive. No loss can be attributed to the Buffalos but four Tomahawks were shot down and two pilots were killed in the air battles.

17 Allied military personnel were killed on the grounds of Mingaladon airfield when the 62nd Sentai bombed it. An estimated 1,000-2,000 civilians were killed during the Japanese bombing of the city's downtown districts. The docks were paralyzed as the labor force fled the city; public transport ground to a halt. A district near to the main docks was burnt out by the bombing; smoke drifted skywards in columns over Rangoon.

The civil defense services broke down when many of the staff fled, though the firemen were considered to have performed well in the crisis. The raid shocked the public and caused an influx refugees as many of them fled into the surrounding jungles and some of them head north towards Prome in hopes for safety from Japanese air attack. Governor Dorman-Smith toured the city that afternoon; the dead lay still uncollected in the tropical climate.

== December 25, 1941 ==
=== Background ===
The losses suffered among Japanese bombers made Sugawara angry and decided to attack the city again on the 24th. However, he did not have much resources and equipment to gather for the attack another day so he delayed the attack until Christmas Day, December 25.
