= Korean–American Volunteer Group =

The Korean–American Volunteer Group was a volunteer air unit organized by the United States government to aid the Republic of Korea against North Korea during the initial phase of the Korean War. It was equipped with only 10 planes.
