= 58th Brigade (United Kingdom) =

Served on the Western Front during the First World War

The 58th Brigade was a formation of British Army. It was part of the new army also known as Kitchener's Army. It was assigned to the 19th (Western) Division and served on the Western Front during the First World War.

== Formation ==
The infantry battalions did not all serve at once, but all were assigned to the brigade during the war.

- 9th Battalion, Cheshire Regiment
- 9th Battalion, Royal Welsh Fusiliers
- 5th Battalion, South Wales Borderers
- 9th Battalion, Welsh Regiment
- 6th Battalion, Wiltshire Regiment
- 2nd Battalion, Wiltshire Regiment
- 58th Machine Gun Company
- 58th Trench Mortar Battery
