= 57th Brigade (United Kingdom) =

Formation in the British Army during World War I

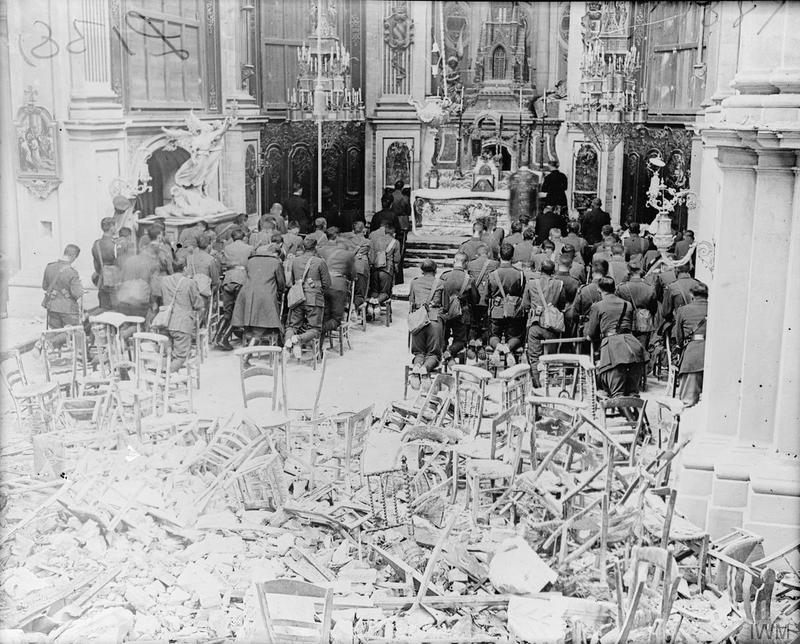
Soldiers of the 57th Brigade (19th Division) hearing mass in the ruined Cambrai Cathedral, 13 October 1918. The Chaplain preaching is Reverend E. Rockliffe of the Society of Jesus (SJ).

The 57th Brigade was a formation of British Army. It was part of the new army also known as Kitchener's Army. It was assigned to the 19th (Western) Division and served on the Western Front during the First World War.

Thomas Cubitt, a future full general, commanded this brigade during the war.

== Formation ==
The infantry battalions did not all serve at once, but all were assigned to the brigade during the war.

- 10th Battalion, Royal Warwickshire Regiment
- 8th Battalion, Gloucestershire Regiment
- 10th Battalion, Worcestershire Regiment
- 8th Battalion, North Staffordshire Regiment
- 3rd Battalion, Worcestershire Regiment
- 57th Machine Gun Company
- 57th Trench Mortar Battery
