= Burkham =

Village in Hampshire, England

Coordinates: 51.184320°N 1.07048°W

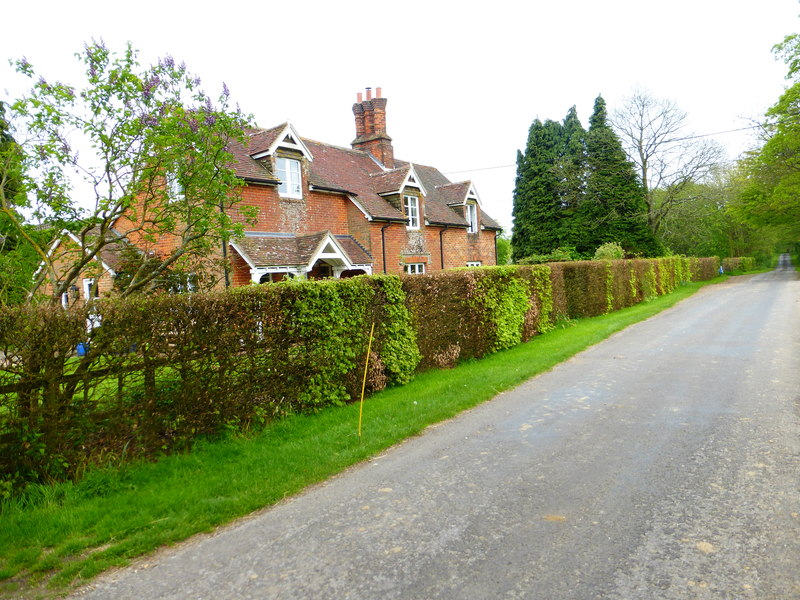
- Home Farm

- Location within Hampshire
- Population: 50
- OS grid reference: SU6506343198
- Civil parish: Bentworth
- District: East Hampshire
- Shire county: Hampshire
- Region: South East
- Country: England
- Sovereign state: United Kingdom
- Post town: Alton
- Postcode district: GU34
- Dialling code: 01420
- Police: Hampshire and Isle of Wight
- Fire: Hampshire and Isle of Wight
- Ambulance: South Central
- Website: http://bentworth.org.uk (parish)

Burkham is a hamlet in the large civil parish of Bentworth in Hampshire, England including a large country house, Burkham House. The nearest town is Alton, which lies about 4.5 miles (7.2 km) to the south-east. Its nearest railway station was formerly the Bentworth and Lasham railway station on the Basingstoke and Alton Light Railway, until its closure in 1932. The nearest railway station is now 3.6 miles (5.8 km) east of the village, at Alton.

Between Burkham and Bentworth is Home Farm, a Woodland Trust area of 339 acres (137 hectares) of mixed woodland, plantations and fields. The area was bought by the Woodland Trust in 1991.

== Burkham House ==
Burkham House lies in the centre of the hamlet, around one mile south to Bentworth. The manor itself returns dated 1316, John Daleron held 'Brocham'. In 1590 Robert Hunt acquired the Bentworth Hall from Henry Lord Windsor, and this included the Burkham area. Later, Robert Magewick purchased Burkham for £160. and George Magewick (1647–1736) was described as the owner of Burkham Farm in 1684. In 1748 James Magewick Battin, presumably a descendant, held the manor, and he is given as the owner in a 1778 Survey of Hampshire.
