= Bentworth Hall =

Country house in Hampshire, England

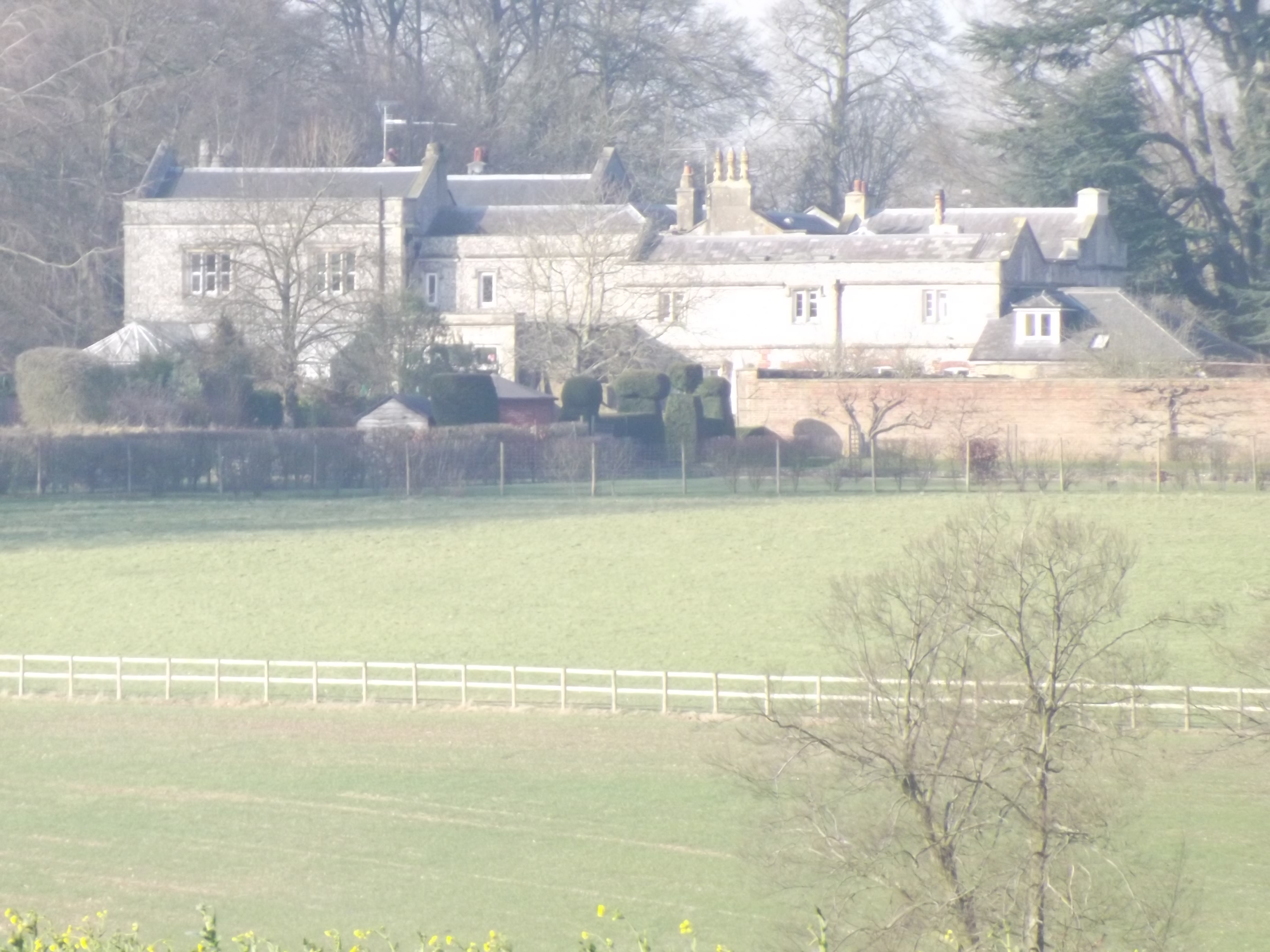
- Bentworth Hall in 2012, from the south

- Location within Hampshire

General information
- Architectural style: Exterior walls 24 inches thick with knapped squared flints embedded on the outside, held in place by high density mortar
- Location: Bentworth, Hampshire, England
- Coordinates: 51.147778°N 1.05°W
- Construction started: 1832
- Client: Roger Staples Horman-Fisher

Bentworth Hall is a country house in the parish of Bentworth in Hampshire, England. It is about 1 mile (1.6 km) south of Bentworth village centre and 4 miles (6.4 km) northwest of Alton, the nearest town.

Before the 1830s, the building originally called Bentworth Hall or Bentworth Manor House is now re-named Hall Place. It was built in the early 14th century and is a Grade II listed building and is 330 feet (100 m) south of the village green.

The current Bentworth Hall is surrounded by woodland that was planted during building which started in 1832, after Roger Staples Horman-Fisher purchased the Bentworth Manor estate.

== 1832 – Building the new Bentworth Hall ==
In 1832, the Bentworth Hall estate of about 500 acres was sold at Garraway's Coffee House in the City of London by the Fitzherbert family.

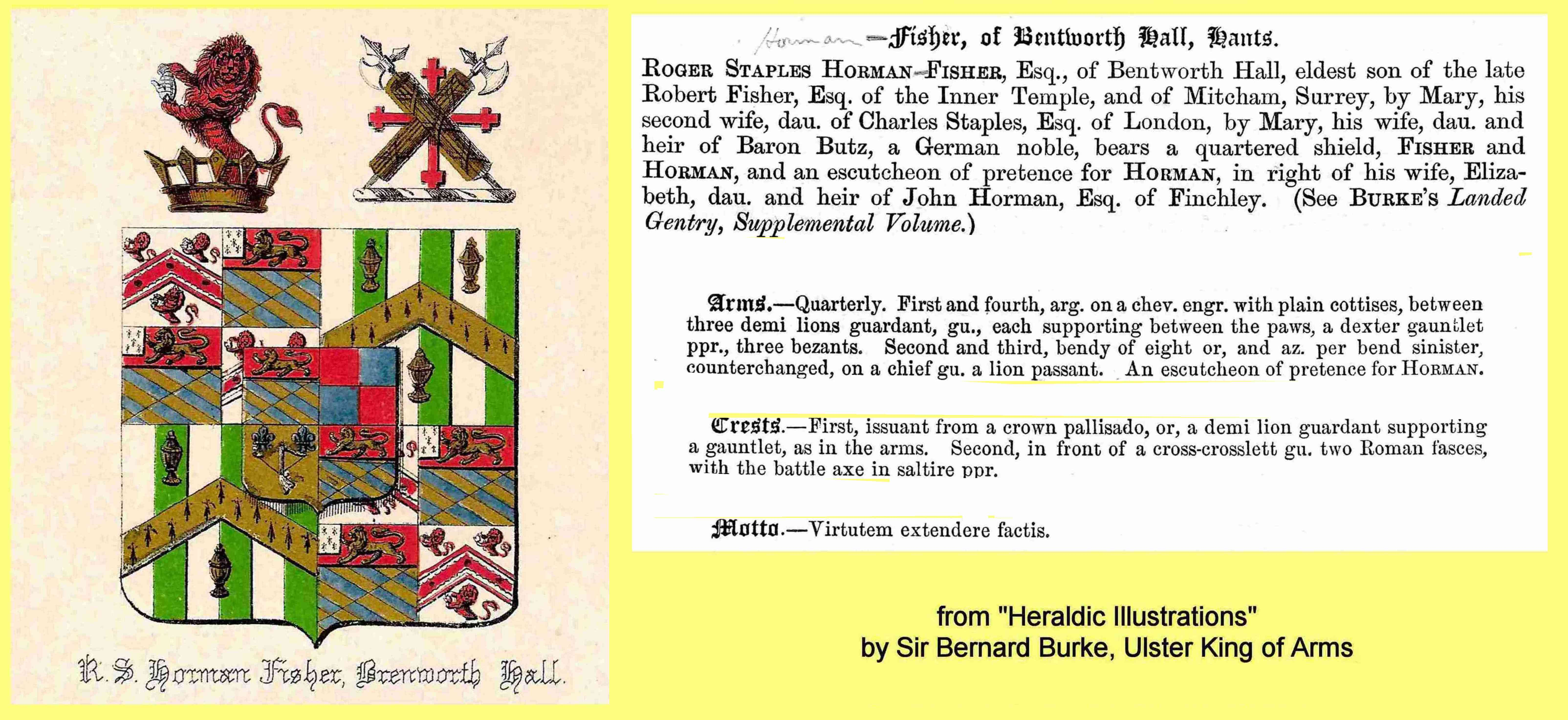
Horman-Fisher family Crest and notes

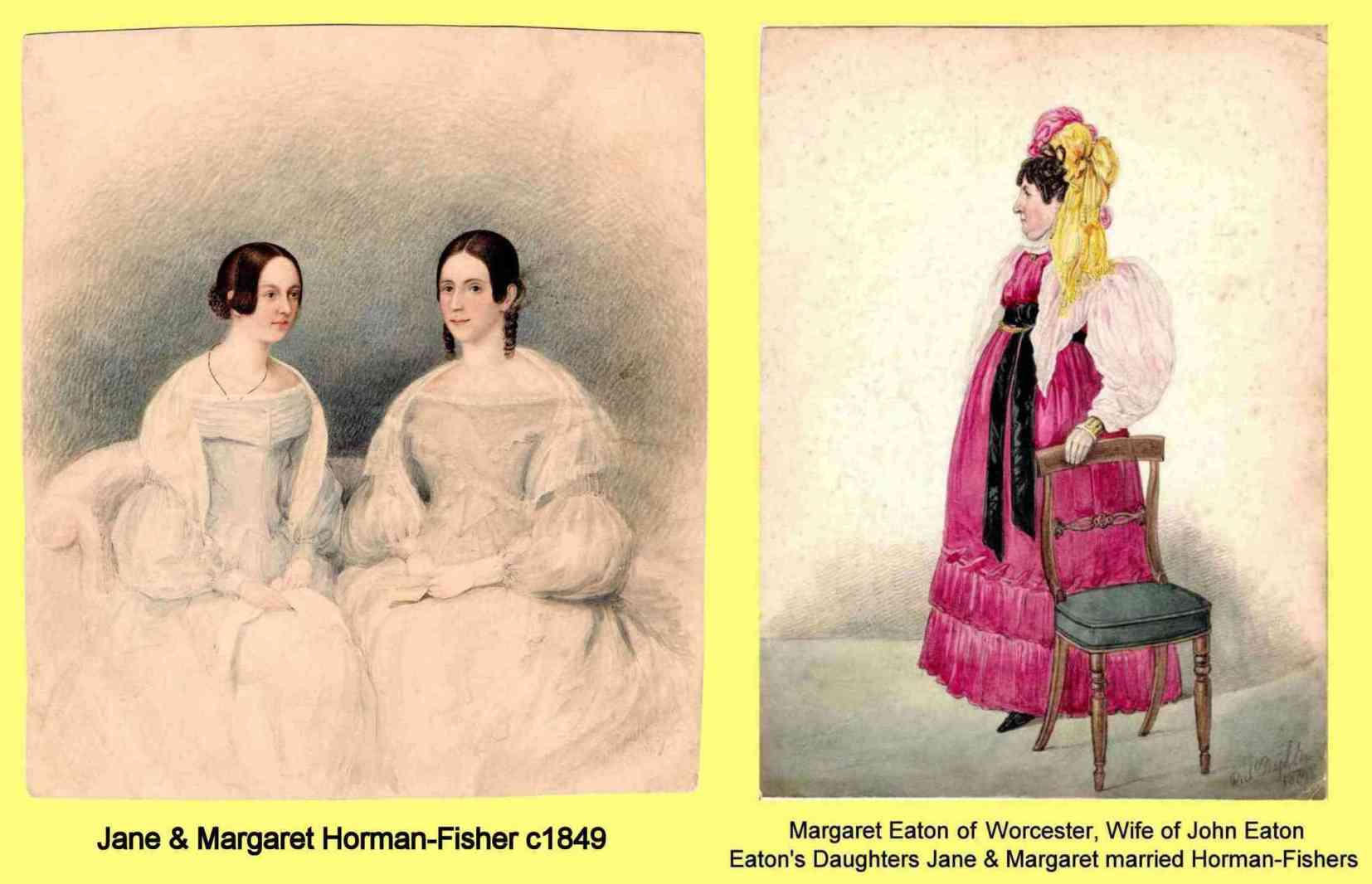
Horman-Fisher wives

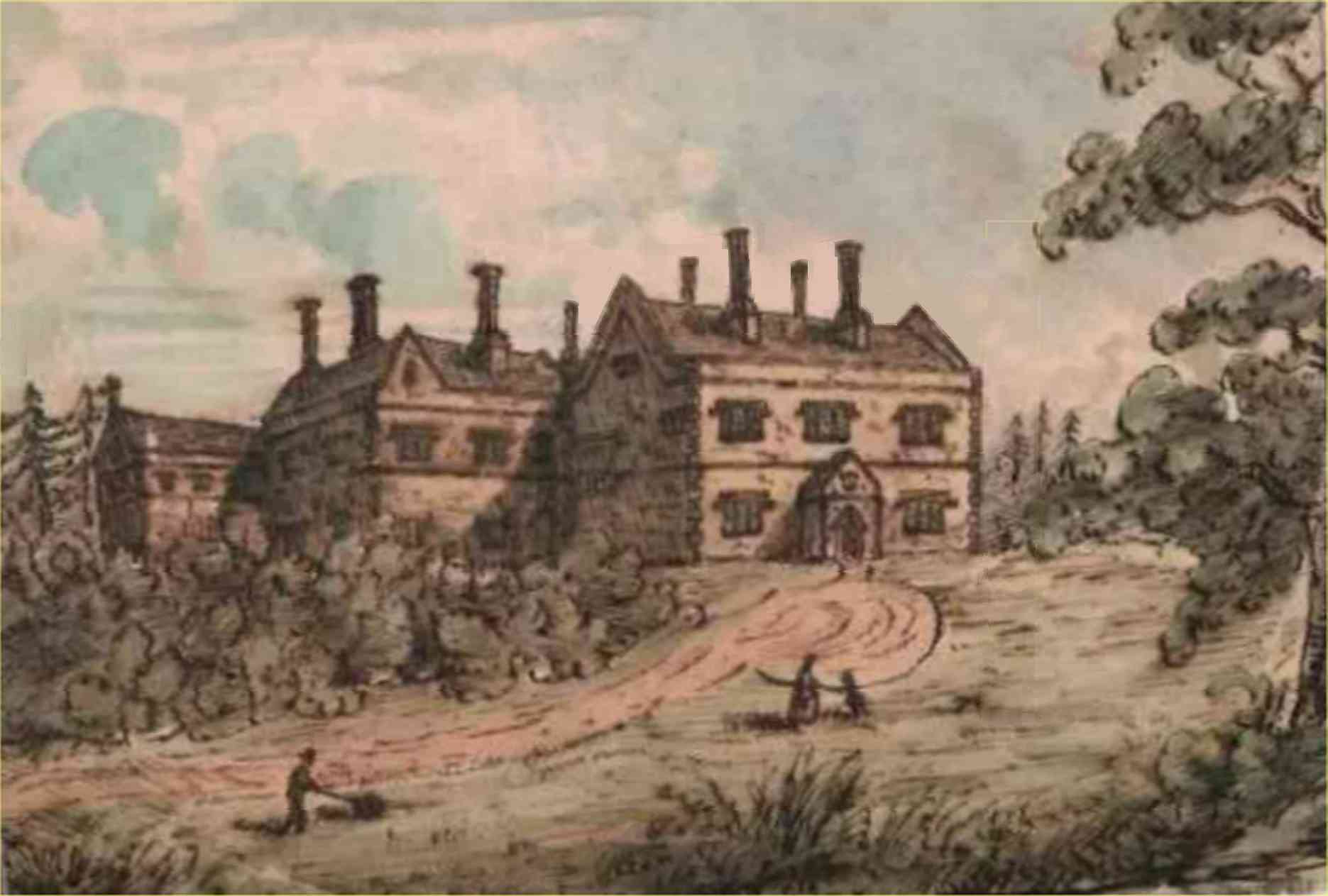
Painting of the new Bentworth Hall c 1840

The Bentworth Hall estate was purchased by Roger Staples Horman-Fisher for about £6000.

Horman-Fisher started building the current Bentworth Hall on what was then open downland about 0.6 miles (0.97 km) to the south of the earlier Bentworth Hall at 51°8′52″N 1°3′0″W, access being from an 800 metres (2,600 ft) private drive from the Bentworth-Medstead road.

The book "Heraldic Illustrations" by Sir Bernard Burke, Ulster King of Arms, stated the following about the Horman-Fisher family. Capitals and abbreviations are as in the original:

"ROGER STAPLES HORMAN-FISHER, Esq., of Bentworth Hall, eldest son of the late Robert Fisher, Esq. of the Inner Temple, and of Mitcham, Surrey, by Mary, his second wife, dau. of Charles Staples, Esq. of London, by Mary, his wife, dau. and heir of Baron Butz, a German noble, bears a quartered shield, FISHER and HORMAN, and an escutcheon of pretence for HORMAN, in right of his wife, Elizabeth, dau. and heir of John Horman, Esq. of Finchley."

It would appear that proof reading in those days was not very good, because under the Horman-Fisher crest, Bentworth is spelled "Brereworth", and the heading of the extract quoted above says "Fisher, of Bentworth Hall, Hants" omitting the name "Horman" which in the copy referred to in this entry was added in pencil.

== 1848 – Sale of Bentworth Hall Estate ==
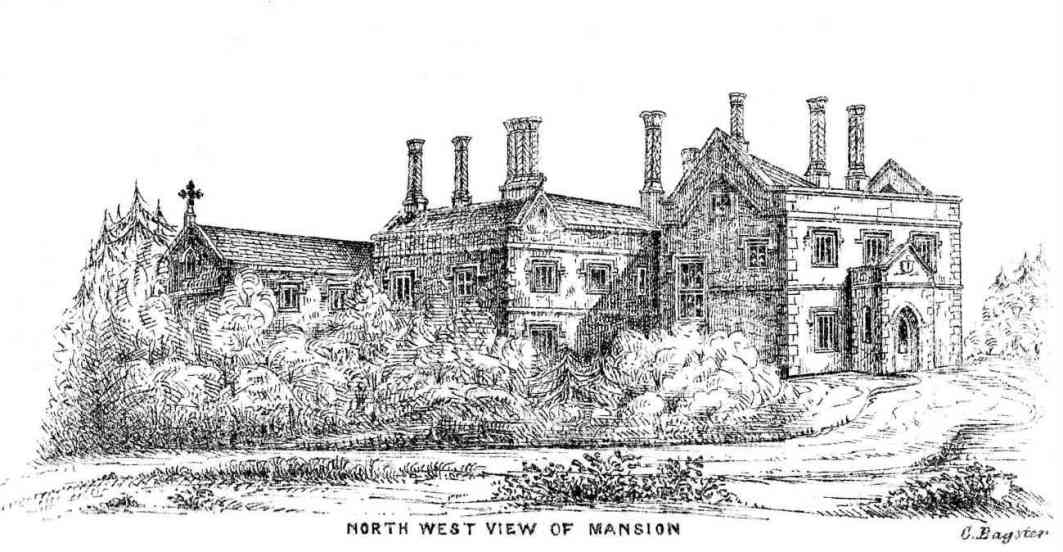
Bentworth Hall from the north, drawing by C Bagster from 1848 sale catalogue – note that the artist has drawn the wrong roof line on the right hand side – the roof is higher and runs close to the peak of the wall at the right of the picture

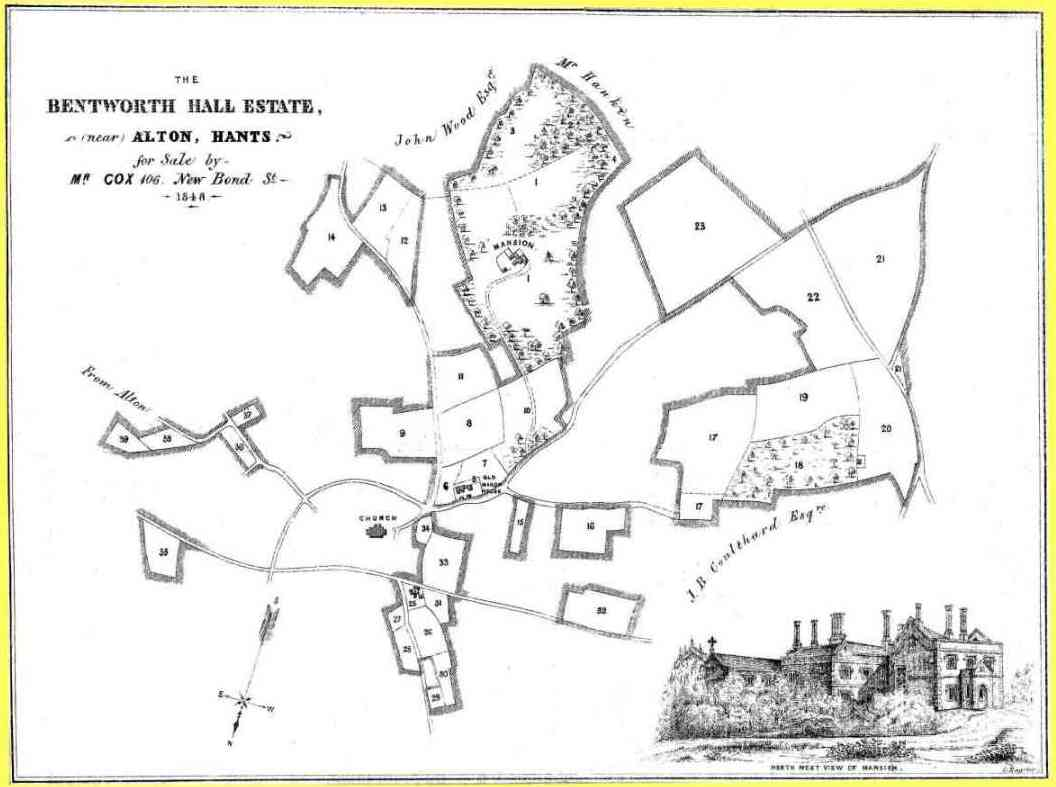
Sale map 1848

In 1848 the Bentworth Hall estate was sold to Jeremiah Robert Ives, including the Old Manor House (now Hall Place) and the more recent 1832-built Bentworth Hall. The sale catalogue dated 16 July 1848 includes the following rather exaggerated description:

"A handsome newly erected Elizabethan (sic) mansion of unique elevation with wall garden, elegant conservatory and stabling. The mansion is built in the most substantial manner and finished without reference to expense, by the proprietor for his own residence. The walls are constructed almost entirely of BLACK FLINT (emphasised in capitals in the original), carefully and minutely cut and smoothed at an incalculable cost, with Stone Cornices, mullions &C blending a beautiful and unique specimen of workmanship with a suitability and durability impenetrable to every change of atmosphere. Six airy and cheerful Family Bedrooms, spacious landing and a broad light principle (sic) staircase leads to the Ground Floor on which is another water closet. This floor comprises a neat vestibule, with a porch at the northwest entrance for the carriage road; a handsome inner hall; surrounded by a library and a breakfast room, elegant drawing room 23 feet (7.0 m) by 18 feet (5.5 m). A dining room of the same size, all 12 feet (3.7 m) high finished with expensive cornices, handsome modern marble chimney pieces and other decorations."

== Later 19th century ==
Robert Ives died in 1865 and the estate passed to his widow Emma. The Ives family later included George Cecil Ives who lived for a time at Bentworth Hall. George Cecil Ives met Oscar Wilde and Lord Alfred Douglas in London, publishing books on history and homosexuality.

In 1890, Emma's son, Colonel Gordon Maynard Gordon-Ives built and lived in Gaston Grange, about 0.8 miles (1.3 km) west of Bentworth Hall. Emma Ives died seven years later and ownership of the Bentworth Hall estate passed to Colonel Gordon-Ives who continued to live at Gaston Grange.

== Early 20th century ==
The southern side of Bentworth Hall in 1905

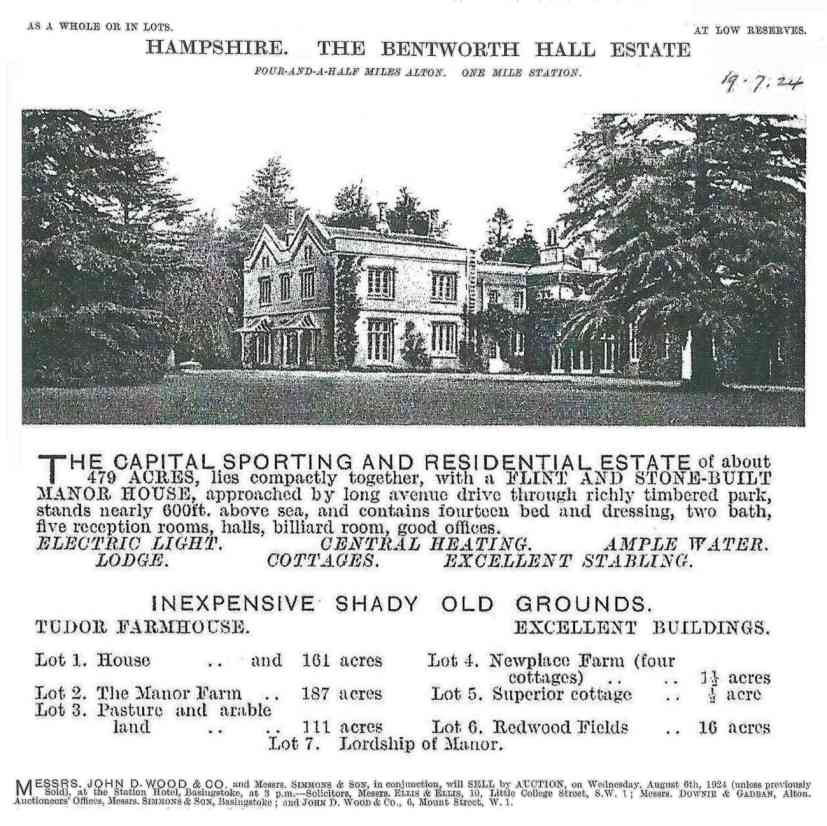
Sale document 1924

Colonel Gordon-Ives rented Bentworth Hall to W. G. Nicholson, member of Parliament for Petersfield. The caption on the photo states:

"Bentworth Hall, Bentworth, tenanted by W. G. Nicholson, M.P., J.P. Bentworth Hall is a large Mansion built about eighty years since of squared flints and stone. The flint work is held to be a fine specimen of its kind. The house stands in a park of 400 acres, and is the property of Colonel Gordon-Ives, C.B."

The small crenellated tower on the right in the photo is believed to have been a water tower, but has subsequently disappeared, as have the canopies over the ground floor windows on the south west side. In later photos the tower is almost completely covered with ivy.

Colonel Gordon-Ives died on 8 September 1907 and the estate passed to his son, Cecil Maynard Gordon-Ives, a Captain in the Scots Guards in the 1914–18 war, who occupied it until his death on 23 July 1923. The Bentworth Hall Estate, then of 479 acres, was offered for sale by John D Wood & Co of 6 Mount St London W1 on 19 July 1924.

The sale document states, with capitals and punctuation as in the original: "THE CAPITAL AND SPORTING RESIDENTIAL ESTATE of about 479 acres, lies compactly together, with a FLINT AND STONE-BUILT MANOR HOUSE, approached by long avenue drive through richly timbered park, stands nearly 600ft. above sea, and contains fourteen bed and dressing, two bath, five reception rooms, halls, billiard room, good offices. ELECTRIC LIGHT. CENTRAL HEATING. AMPLE WATER. LODGE. COTTAGES. EXCELLENT STABLING. INEXPENSIVE SHADY OLD GROUNDS. TUDOR (sic) FARMHOUSE. EXCELLENT BUILDINGS"

The sale was in 7 Lots, Lot 7 being for the "Lordship of Manor."

It was offered again for sale on 26 June 1930, by direction of A d’A Willis who presumably purchased it in 1924. This time, the advertised area was 462 acres (187 ha), which suggests that Lot 6 of the 1924 sale, Redwood Fields, was not included (the Redwood area is south of Bentworth close to the village of Medstead). The purchaser may have been Major John Arthur Pryor because he is recorded as living at Bentworth Hall in the 1930s.

== World War II ==
At the beginning of the war, the Bentworth Hall estate was taken over by the military together with other local large houses and estates such as Gaston Grange and Thedden Grange.

In 1941 Bentworth Hall was occupied by a unit of the Mobile Naval Base Defence Organisation (MNBDO) as an out-station of Haslar Naval Hospital in Portsmouth. The bedrooms were the wards and there was a doctor's office upstairs. The upstairs bathroom in the middle of the west wing was a darkroom for developing X-ray plates, presumably because it had one relatively small window that was easy to cover. This information came from N Crabb, a Royal Marine who was at Bentworth Hall during the war and married a maid who had worked at Medstead Grange, a country house 1.1 miles (1.8 km) south of Bentworth Hall.

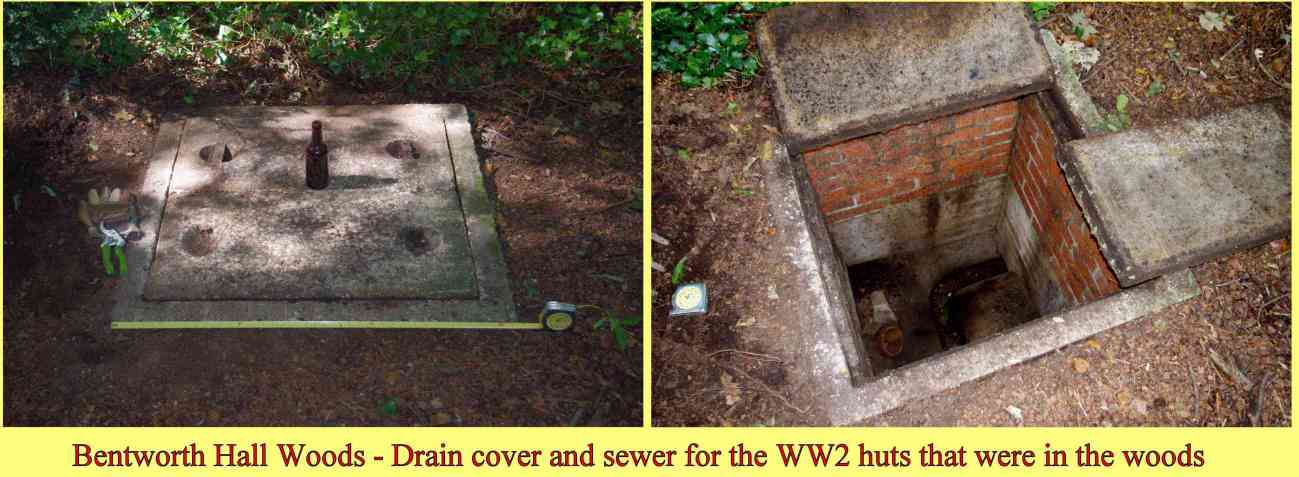
2014 photos of drain cover and sewer in woods

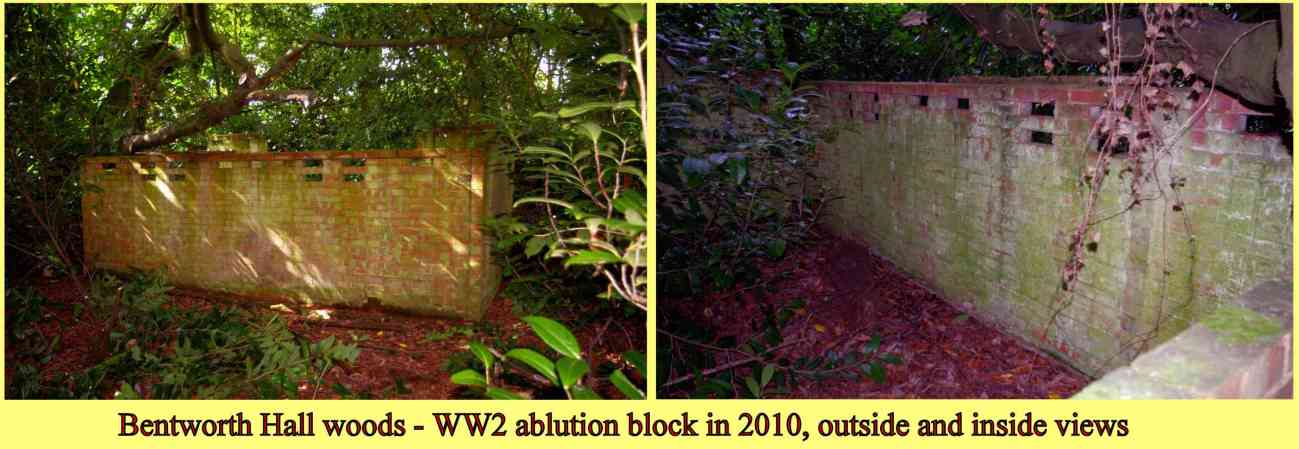
WW2 brick building in woods

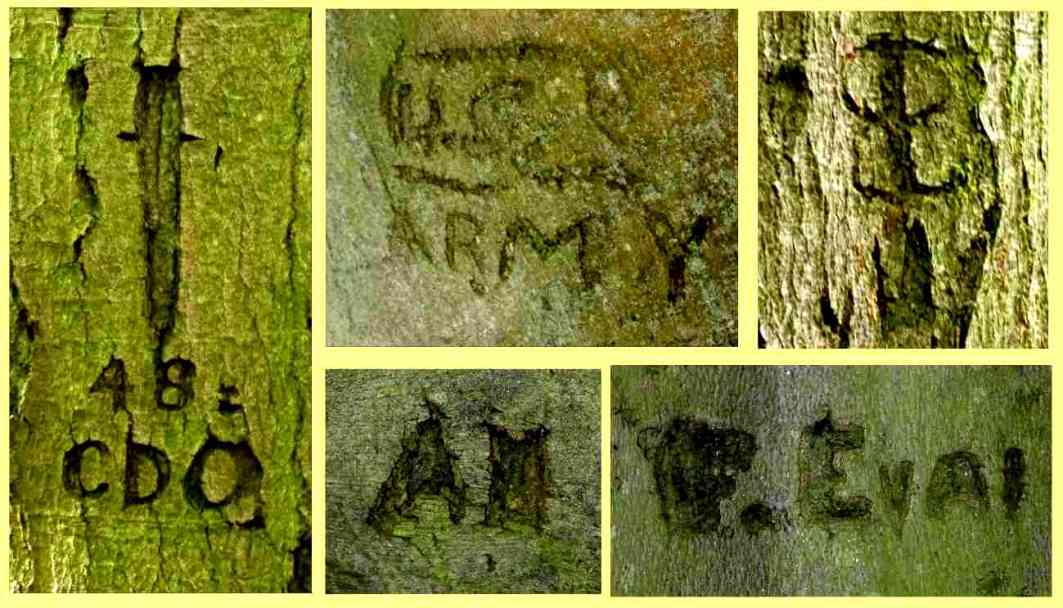
2016 carvings on trees by soldiers stationed at Bentworth Hall – particularly note "US Army" top centre

Later, other military organisations were there because in the woods there is a carving of "48 CDO" on one of the trees. This refers to the British 48 Marine Commando which presumably had a unit at Bentworth Hall before their main body deployed abroad for operations. Several Nissen huts were erected in the woods to the west of the Hall and the concrete bases of several of them are still there (in 2019) together with small amounts of the corrugated iron which covered them, although some concrete was removed in the 1980s because it was causing vegetation and trees to die. In the woods to the SW of the house, a brick-built enclosure is still standing which may have been an ablution block, and near the west boundary of the woods is a 3 feet (0.91 m) wide square drain cover under which are sewer pipes that would have been connected to latrines in the hut complex.

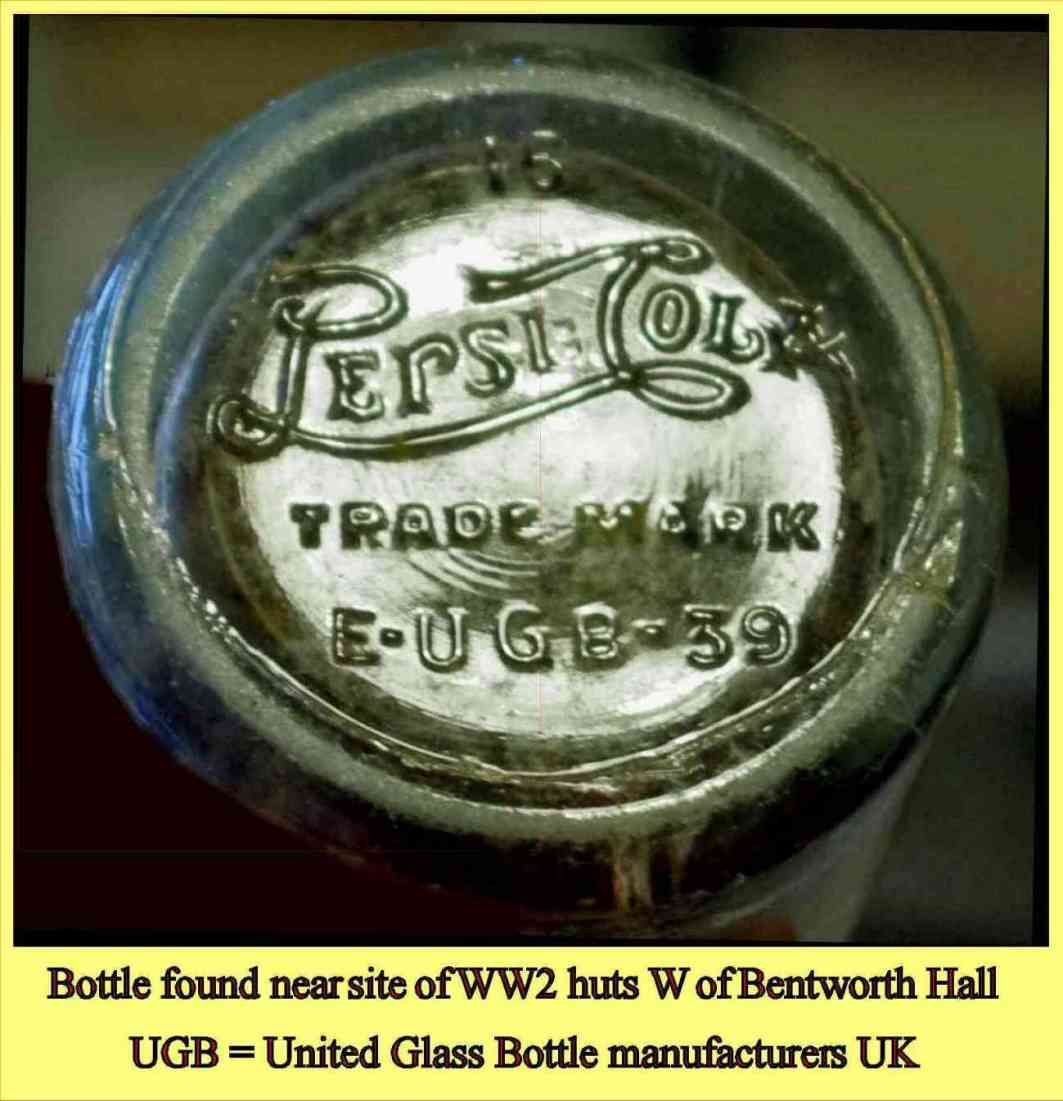
1939 Pepsi bottle found in woods

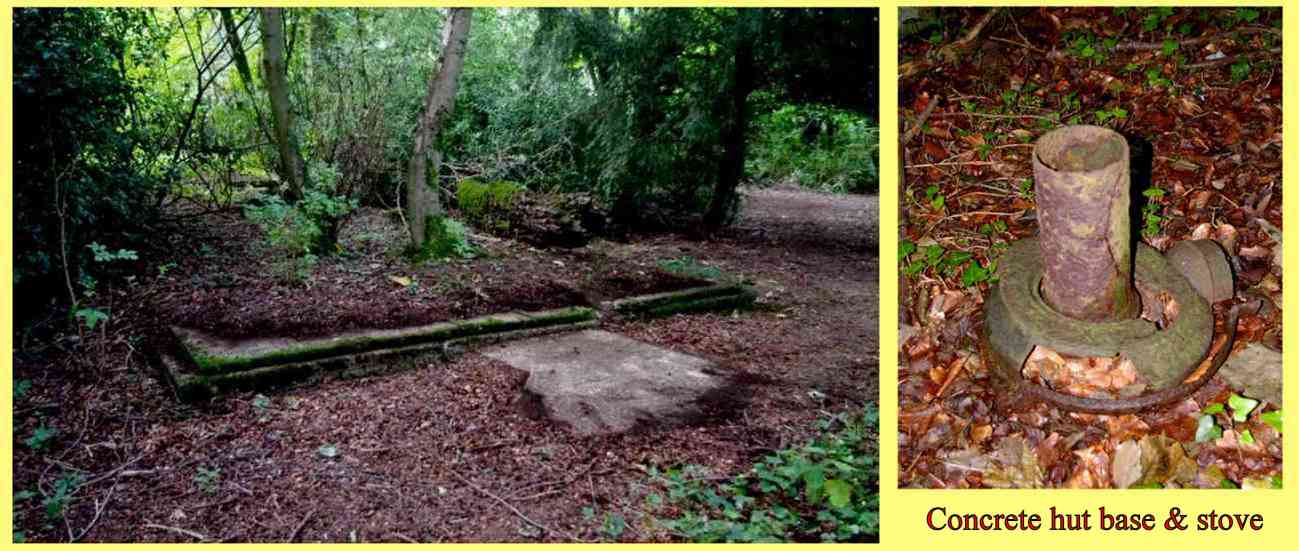
2013 photo of concrete hut base & remains of the top of a coke stove that would have been used inside one of the huts

In 1944 Bentworth Hall was occupied by American and British Commonwealth personnel. A swimming pool had been put in, also two cookhouses and a water tower. Huts in the woods were for accommodation although some officers lived in the Hall itself. The cornfield to the SW was an airstrip with 3 L4 light aircraft (the US Army version of the Piper Cub) which the Colonel used to fly to the airfield at Lasham

The above information came from Michael (Mick) Lennox, ex US Army, who visited Bentworth Hall from his home in New York on 6 June 1994 (the day of D-Day 50 years earlier). Lennox said that he had been accommodated in one of the huts in the woods before D-day and on walking round the woods, he located where his bed-space would have been.

== After the War ==
An ordnance disposal unit operated in the corner of the wood near the field to the south, towards Colliers Wood. Ordnance was taken to the hollow or "dell" in the field and detonated there.

In 1947, the Bentworth Hall estate was bought by Major Herbert Cecil Benyon Berens, who was a director of Hambros bank in London from 1968. In 1950, Major Berens built two new lodge houses at the junction of the drive to Bentworth Hall with the main road through the village towards Medstead. He also built an extension to the south of the centre of Bentworth Hall itself with tall windows down to ground level facing south west. The walls of the extension matched the squared flint of the main building, and the extension was known as the "Garden Rooms".

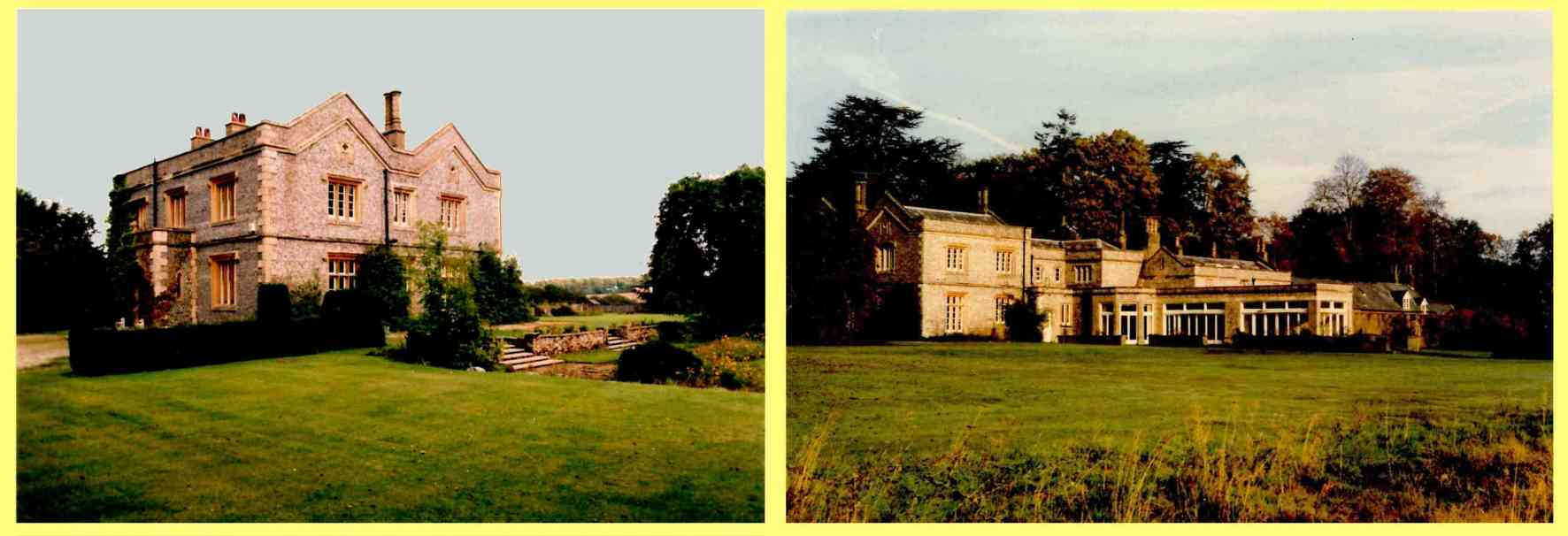
Bentworth Hall in 1983

Major Berens was a keen game shooter and each year his keeper raised pheasants in the old stable and coach block before the young birds were put into the woods. There was accommodation for the keeper in the stable block with one downstairs and one upstairs room. In the 1970s the keeper was "Ginger" Woods, a well-known village character who also lived in house on the road between Bentworth and Medstead near the cricket pitch, land that was owned by the Berens family.

Major Berens died at Bentworth Hall on 27 October 1981 and after this the remaining estate was put up for sale.

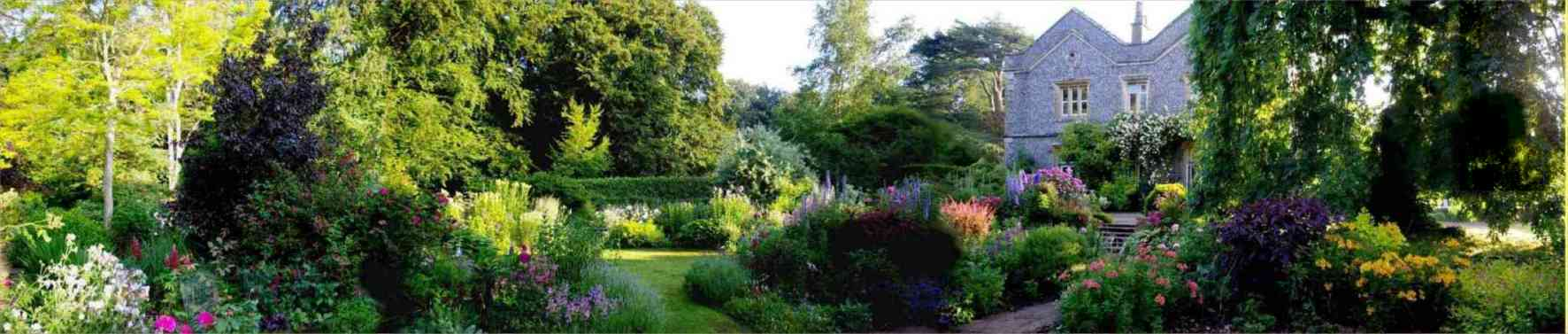
West Wing of Bentworth Hall in 2013 with steps down to sunken garden

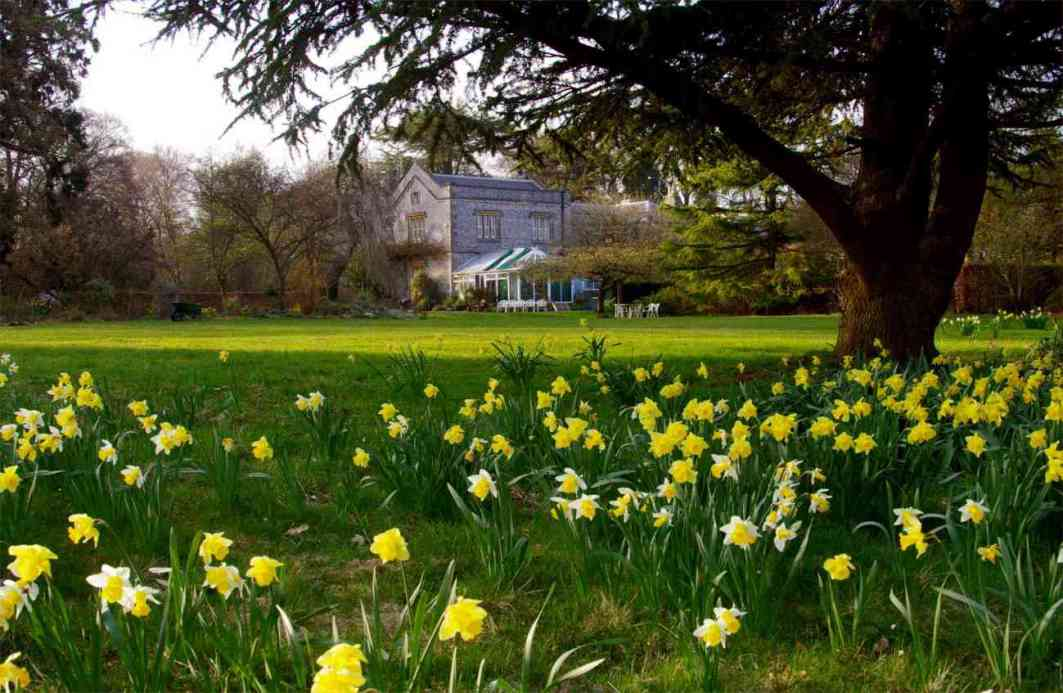
Daffodils at Bentworth Hall in 2016

In early 1982 Stella and Ian Strachan bought the West Wing and about 10 acres of land. Stella was an enthusiastic gardener and developed the sunken garden to the west and other areas. She was the founder chairman of the Bentworth Garden Club that was formed in 2001 after the Bentworth area Millennium survey had identified a desire for such an organisation.

The West Wing garden is opened for special events associated with the Bentworth Garden Club and other local organisations.
