= Herbert Cecil Benyon Berens =

British businessman and cricketer

Herbert Cecil Benyon Berens (16 October 1908, in Bromley, then Kent – 27 October 1981, in Bentworth, Hampshire) was a British accountant, banker and businessman, a military figure during World War II, and a cricketer.

== Biography ==
Born in 1908, he was the son of Cecil Berens and his wife Mildred Turnour Blackwood, daughter of James Blackwood, and the great-grandson of Richard Berens.

As a young man he was a cricketer, representing Wellington College in Berkshire where he studied between 1925-1927 and Kent Second XI in the Minor Counties Championship in 1930. He also studied at Christ Church, Oxford. Beren's eldest son of three, Richard Wilfrid Beavoir, was born on 18 February 1933 and later educated at Eton. An article from The London Gazette, dated 22 November 1938, mentions Berens as residing at 41 Bishopsgate, London and that with Leslie Robert Friend-Smith he was appointed as a joint liquidator in a special resolution passed by the Bishmore Trust Limited.

On 27 June 1939, Berens was deployed under the Royal Armoured Corps to serve in Egypt and Libya during World War II. He was awarded the Military Cross in September 1942 for his services during the war. Major Berens purchased Bentworth Hall in Bentworth, Hampshire in 1947 and in 1950 built two new lodge houses at the junction of the drive.

Berens was director of Hambros bank in London from 1968. He also held positions as director of Bentworth Credits Ltd, Bentworth (New Street) Ltd and Easyserve Entertainments Ltd and had business interests in liquor and also in energy according to the Financial Times. He died on 27 October 1981 and is mentioned in The London Gazette on 29 January 1982 as being a "merchant banker" by profession and residing at Bentworth Hall until his death.
