= List of civil parishes in Hampshire =

This is a list of civil parishes in the ceremonial county of Hampshire, England. There are 267 civil parishes.

Population figures are unavailable for some of the smallest parishes.

The following former districts are unparished: the Basingstoke Municipal Borough, Fareham Urban District, Gosport Municipal Borough, Havant and Waterloo Urban District, Southsea Civil Parish, Portsmouth County Borough, Aldershot Municipal Borough, Farnborough Urban District, Southampton County Borough and Winchester Municipal Borough. This includes the whole of the modern districts of: Rushmoor, Southampton, Portsmouth, Havant, Gosport and Fareham.

Parishes in Emsworth and Hayling Island, both in Havant, will be established in 2027.

Civil Parish	Civil Parish Population 2011	Area (km^{2}) 2011	Pre 1974 District	District
Abbotts Ann	2,566	13.05	Andover Rural District	Test Valley
Allbrook	1,755	1.35	Eastleigh Municipal Borough	Eastleigh
Alton (town)	17,816	11.29	Alton Urban District	East Hampshire
Ampfield	1,583	9.95	Romsey and Stockbridge Rural District	Test Valley
Amport	1,189	16.20	Andover Rural District	Test Valley
Andover	38,290	17.44	Andover Municipal Borough	Test Valley
Appleshaw	503	2.84	Andover Rural District	Test Valley
Ashford Hill with Headley	1,277	16.64	Kingsclere and Whitchurch Rural District	Basingstoke and Deane
Ashley			Romsey and Stockbridge Rural District	Test Valley
Ashmansworth	216	11.90	Kingsclere and Whitchurch Rural District	Basingstoke and Deane
Ashurst and Colbury	2,093	2.82	New Forest Rural District	New Forest
Awbridge	712	4.77	Romsey and Stockbridge Rural District	Test Valley
Badger Farm	2,501	0.60	Winchester Municipal Borough	Winchester
Barton Stacey	948	20.32	Andover Rural District	Test Valley
Baughurst	2,489	15.96	Kingsclere and Whitchurch Rural District	Basingstoke and Deane
Beaulieu	806	35.18	New Forest Rural District	New Forest
Beauworth			Winchester Rural District	Winchester
Beech	532	5.81	Alton Urban District	East Hampshire
Bentley	1,166	10.03	Alton Rural District	East Hampshire
Bentworth	553	15.15	Alton Rural District	East Hampshire
Bighton	341	11.56	Winchester Rural District	Winchester
Binsted	1,817	31.09	Alton Rural District	East Hampshire
Bishops Sutton	463	12.09	Winchester Rural District	Winchester
Bishop's Waltham	6,723	19.79	Droxford Rural District	Winchester
Bishopstoke	9,974	5.92	Eastleigh Municipal Borough	Eastleigh
Blackwater and Hawley (town)	4,473	11.65	Hartley Wintney Rural District	Hart
Boarhunt	600	10.24	Droxford Rural District	Winchester
Boldre	2,003	23.14	New Forest Rural District	New Forest
Bossington			Romsey and Stockbridge Rural District	Test Valley
Botley	5,083	8.49	Winchester Rural District	Eastleigh
Bradley			Basingstoke Rural District	Basingstoke and Deane
Braishfield	684	8.97	Romsey and Stockbridge Rural District	Test Valley
Bramdean and Hinton Ampner	629	14.62	Winchester Rural District	Winchester
Bramley	4,233	11.90	Basingstoke Rural District	Basingstoke and Deane
Bramshaw	677	28.43	New Forest Rural District	New Forest
Bramshill	133	9.02	Hartley Wintney Rural District	Hart
Bramshott and Liphook	8,491	26.07	Petersfield Rural District	East Hampshire
Bransgore	4,238	18.57	Ringwood and Fordingbridge Rural District	New Forest
Breamore	364	14.63	Ringwood and Fordingbridge Rural District	New Forest
Brockenhurst	3,552	48.82	New Forest Rural District	New Forest
Broughton	1,003	15.32	Romsey and Stockbridge Rural District	Test Valley
Buckholt			Romsey and Stockbridge Rural District	Test Valley
Bullington	123	6.60	Andover Rural District	Test Valley
Burghclere	1,152	21.24	Kingsclere and Whitchurch Rural District	Basingstoke and Deane
Buriton	785	21.14	Petersfield Rural District	East Hampshire
Burley	1,384	45.53	Ringwood and Fordingbridge Rural District	New Forest
Bursledon	6,188	4.63	Winchester Rural District	Eastleigh
Candovers	236	20.09	Basingstoke Rural District	Basingstoke and Deane
Chandler's Ford	23,916	7.72	Eastleigh Municipal Borough	Eastleigh
Charlton	1,947	2.36	Andover Municipal Borough	Test Valley
Chawton	445	8.71	Alton Rural District	East Hampshire
Cheriton	746	19.03	Winchester Rural District	Winchester
Chilbolton	988	12.68	Andover Rural District	Test Valley
Chilcomb			Winchester Rural District	Winchester
Chilworth	1,204	10.63	Romsey and Stockbridge Rural District	Test Valley
Chineham	7,776	2.16	Basingstoke Rural District	Basingstoke and Deane
Church Crookham	8,479	9.10	Fleet Urban District	Hart
Clanfield	4,637	13.71	Petersfield Rural District	East Hampshire
Cliddesden	497	4.55	Basingstoke Rural District	Basingstoke and Deane
Colden Common	3,857	6.91	Winchester Rural District	Winchester
Colemore and Priors Dean	135	12.36	Petersfield Rural District	East Hampshire
Compton and Shawford	1,729	8.79	Winchester Rural District	Winchester
Copythorne	2,673	23.17	New Forest Rural District	New Forest
Corhampton and Meonstoke	759	13.35	Droxford Rural District	Winchester
Crawley	418	14.34	Winchester Rural District	Winchester
Crondall	1,770	16.74	Hartley Wintney Rural District	Hart
Crookham Village	4,037	4.38	Hartley Wintney Rural District	Hart
Curdridge	1,398	11.88	Droxford Rural District	Winchester
Damerham	508	18.89	Ringwood and Fordingbridge Rural District	New Forest
Deane	202	12.80	Basingstoke Rural District	Basingstoke and Deane
Denmead	6,736	16.47	Droxford Rural District	Winchester
Denny Lodge	299	71.42	New Forest Rural District	New Forest
Dogmersfield	279	7.67	Hartley Wintney Rural District	Hart
Droxford	675	9.84	Droxford Rural District	Winchester
Dummer	466	15.88	Basingstoke Rural District	Basingstoke and Deane
Durley	992	10.11	Droxford Rural District	Winchester
East Boldre	832	12.47	New Forest Rural District	New Forest
East Dean	228	4.33	Romsey and Stockbridge Rural District	Test Valley
East Meon	1,257	34.59	Petersfield Rural District	East Hampshire
East Tisted	209	10.60	Alton Rural District	East Hampshire
East Tytherley	186	10.61	Romsey and Stockbridge Rural District	Test Valley
East Woodhay	2,914	17.65	Kingsclere and Whitchurch Rural District	Basingstoke and Deane
Eastleigh Town			Eastleigh Municipal Borough	Eastleigh
Ecchinswell, Sydmonton and Bishops Green		10.48	Kingsclere and Whitchurch Rural District	Basingstoke and Deane
Ellingham, Harbridge and Ibsley		11.71	Ringwood and Fordingbridge Rural District	New Forest
Ellisfield	272	9.49	Basingstoke Rural District	Basingstoke and Deane
Elvetham Heath	5,183	1.75	Fleet Urban District	Hart
Enham Alamein	804	3.79	Andover Municipal Borough	Test Valley
Eversley	1,653	12.62	Hartley Wintney Rural District	Hart
Ewshot	635	1.71	Hartley Wintney Rural District	Hart
Exbury and Lepe	174	8.69	New Forest Rural District	New Forest
Exton	203	14.73	Droxford Rural District	Winchester
Faccombe	146	15.14	Andover Rural District	Test Valley
Fair Oak and Horton Heath	10,212	9.23	Eastleigh Municipal Borough	Eastleigh
Farleigh Wallop			Basingstoke Rural District	Basingstoke and Deane
Farringdon	664	8.51	Alton Rural District	East Hampshire
Fawley	14,287	28.66	New Forest Rural District	New Forest
Fleet (town)	21,858	13.06	Fleet Urban District	Hart
Fordingbridge (town)	5,998	13.86	Ringwood and Fordingbridge Rural District	New Forest
Four Marks	3,983	6.08	Alton Rural District	East Hampshire
Frenchmoor			Romsey and Stockbridge Rural District	Test Valley
Froxfield and Privett	961	24.66	Petersfield Rural District	East Hampshire
Froyle	644	18.78	Alton Rural District	East Hampshire
Fyfield	437	5.23	Andover Rural District	Test Valley
Godshill	436	16.57	Ringwood and Fordingbridge Rural District	New Forest
Goodworth Clatford	760	11.41	Andover Rural District	Test Valley
Grateley	645	6.27	Andover Rural District	Test Valley
Grayshott	2,413	3.70	Alton Rural District	East Hampshire
Greatham	795	5.21	Petersfield Rural District	East Hampshire
Greywell	237	3.45	Hartley Wintney Rural District	Hart
Hale	519	7.46	Ringwood and Fordingbridge Rural District	New Forest
Hambledon	962	22.33	Droxford Rural District	Winchester
Hamble-le-Rice	4,695	3.35	Winchester Rural District	Eastleigh
Hannington	493	28.48	Kingsclere and Whitchurch Rural District	Basingstoke and Deane
Hartley Wespall	241	9.76	Basingstoke Rural District	Basingstoke and Deane
Hartley Wintney	4,999	21.81	Hartley Wintney Rural District	Hart
Hawkley	497	10.28	Petersfield Rural District	East Hampshire
Headbourne Worthy	466	7.66	Winchester Rural District	Winchester
Headley	5,613	19.55	Alton Rural District	East Hampshire
Heckfield	339	12.57	Hartley Wintney Rural District	Hart
Hedge End (town)	20,790	7.08	Winchester Rural District	Eastleigh
Herriard	253	12.04	Basingstoke Rural District	Basingstoke and Deane
Highclere	1,606	16.53	Kingsclere and Whitchurch Rural District	Basingstoke and Deane
Hook	7,770	9.42	Hartley Wintney Rural District	Hart
Hordle	5,654	10.66	Lymington Municipal Borough	New Forest
Horndean	12,942	18.16	Petersfield Rural District	East Hampshire
Houghton	474	16.89	Romsey and Stockbridge Rural District	Test Valley
Hound	7,105	7.60	Winchester Rural District	Eastleigh
Hursley	889	35.21	Winchester Rural District	Winchester
Hurstbourne Priors	364	19.57	Kingsclere and Whitchurch Rural District	Basingstoke and Deane
Hurstbourne Tarrant	864	19.55	Andover Rural District	Test Valley
Hyde	928	17.75	Ringwood and Fordingbridge Rural District	New Forest
Hythe and Dibden	20,526	12.58	New Forest Rural District	New Forest
Itchen Stoke and Ovington	216	16.23	Winchester Rural District	Winchester
Itchen Valley	1,459	43.67	Winchester Rural District	Winchester
Kilmeston	276	6.76	Winchester Rural District	Winchester
Kimpton	337	11.21	Andover Rural District	Test Valley
King's Somborne	1,702	42.70	Romsey and Stockbridge Rural District	Test Valley
Kings Worthy	4,435	8.95	Winchester Rural District	Winchester
Kingsclere	3,164	15.16	Kingsclere and Whitchurch Rural District	Basingstoke and Deane
Kingsley	607	6.19	Alton Rural District	East Hampshire
Langrish	297	9.73	Petersfield Rural District	East Hampshire
Lasham	176	7.28	Alton Rural District	East Hampshire
Laverstoke	415	13.48	Kingsclere and Whitchurch Rural District	Basingstoke and Deane
Leckford	133	9.16	Romsey and Stockbridge Rural District	Test Valley
Lindford	2,791	0.78	Alton Rural District	East Hampshire
Linkenholt			Andover Rural District	Test Valley
Liss	6,291	14.77	Petersfield Rural District	East Hampshire
Litchfield and Woodcott	137	14.55	Kingsclere and Whitchurch Rural District	Basingstoke and Deane
Little Somborne			Romsey and Stockbridge Rural District	Test Valley
Littleton and Harestock	3,577	5.24	Winchester Rural District	Winchester
Lockerley	798	6.22	Romsey and Stockbridge Rural District	Test Valley
Long Sutton	683	9.46	Hartley Wintney Rural District	Hart
Longparish	716	21.57	Andover Rural District	Test Valley
Longstock	457	12.08	Romsey and Stockbridge Rural District	Test Valley
Lymington and Pennington (town)	15,407	13.67	Lymington Municipal Borough	New Forest
Lyndhurst	3,029	16.36	New Forest Rural District	New Forest
Mapledurwell	620	8.07	Basingstoke Rural District	Basingstoke and Deane
Marchwood	6,141	8.15	New Forest Rural District	New Forest
Martin	413	21.06	Ringwood and Fordingbridge Rural District	New Forest
Mattingley	583	10.31	Hartley Wintney Rural District	Hart
Medstead	2,036	11.72	Alton Rural District	East Hampshire
Melchet Park and Plaitford	346	7.53	Romsey and Stockbridge Rural District	Test Valley
Micheldever	1,387	42.50	Winchester Rural District	Winchester
Michelmersh and Timsbury	881	11.42	Romsey and Stockbridge Rural District	Test Valley
Milford on Sea	4,660	9.97	Lymington Municipal Borough	New Forest
Minstead	685	39.20	New Forest Rural District	New Forest
Monk Sherborne	384	8.44	Basingstoke Rural District	Basingstoke and Deane
Monxton	277	4.49	Andover Rural District	Test Valley
Mortimer West End	417	9.09	Basingstoke Rural District	Basingstoke and Deane
Mottisfont	385	11.86	Romsey and Stockbridge Rural District	Test Valley
Nether Wallop	876	29.86	Romsey and Stockbridge Rural District	Test Valley
Netley Marsh	2,151	12.73	New Forest Rural District	New Forest
New Alresford (town)	5,431	2.79	Winchester Rural District	Winchester
New Milton (town)	25,717	20.85	Lymington Municipal Borough	New Forest
Newlands			Droxford Rural District	Winchester
Newnham	518	3.86	Basingstoke Rural District	Basingstoke and Deane
Newton Valence	226	8.37	Alton Rural District	East Hampshire
Newtown	382	2.45	Kingsclere and Whitchurch Rural District	Basingstoke and Deane
North Baddesley	6,823	7.93	Romsey and Stockbridge Rural District	Test Valley
North Waltham	870	7.88	Basingstoke Rural District	Basingstoke and Deane
Northington	221	12.81	Winchester Rural District	Winchester
Nursling and Rownhams	5,137	11.67	Romsey and Stockbridge Rural District	Test Valley
Nutley	196	13.34	Basingstoke Rural District	Basingstoke and Deane
Oakley	5,086	10.16	Basingstoke Rural District	Basingstoke and Deane
Odiham	5,616	23.42	Hartley Wintney Rural District	Hart
Old Alresford	577	16.92	Winchester Rural District	Winchester
Old Basing and Lychpit	7,308	15.50	Basingstoke Rural District	Basingstoke and Deane
Olivers Battery	1,547	1.09	Winchester Rural District	Winchester
Otterbourne	1,539	4.73	Winchester Rural District	Winchester
Over Wallop	2,182	18.90	Romsey and Stockbridge Rural District	Test Valley
Overton	4,315	34.70	Kingsclere and Whitchurch Rural District	Basingstoke and Deane
Owslebury	818	24.58	Winchester Rural District	Winchester
Pamber	2,613	9.44	Basingstoke Rural District	Basingstoke and Deane
Penton Grafton	794	7.65	Andover Rural District	Test Valley
Penton Mewsey	412	4.31	Andover Rural District	Test Valley
Petersfield (town)	14,974	9.23	Petersfield Urban District	East Hampshire
Popham			Basingstoke Rural District	Basingstoke and Deane
Preston Candover	510	17.92	Basingstoke Rural District	Basingstoke and Deane
Quarley	150	6.85	Andover Rural District	Test Valley
Ringwood (town)	14,181	29.32	Ringwood and Fordingbridge Rural District	New Forest
Rockbourne	331	15.53	Ringwood and Fordingbridge Rural District	New Forest
Romsey Extra	3,276	32.49	Romsey and Stockbridge Rural District	Test Valley
Romsey (town)	14,768	4.24	Romsey Municipal Borough	Test Valley
Rooksdown	3,580	2.00	Basingstoke Rural District	Basingstoke and Deane
Ropley	1,602	14.97	Alton Rural District	East Hampshire
Rotherwick	564	8.23	Hartley Wintney Rural District	Hart
Rowland's Castle	2,747	18.94	Petersfield Rural District	East Hampshire
Sandleheath	680	1.89	Ringwood and Fordingbridge Rural District	New Forest
Selborne	1,288	20.07	Alton Rural District	East Hampshire
Shalden	435	8.75	Alton Rural District	East Hampshire
Shedfield	3,942	10.23	Droxford Rural District	Winchester
Sheet				East Hampshire
Sherborne St John	3,265	13.77	Basingstoke Rural District	Basingstoke and Deane
Sherfield English	708	8.53	Romsey and Stockbridge Rural District	Test Valley
Sherfield on Loddon	3,107	9.14	Basingstoke Rural District	Basingstoke and Deane
Sherfield Park			Basingstoke Rural District	Basingstoke and Deane
Shipton Bellinger	1,504	10.34	Andover Rural District	Test Valley
Silchester	921	7.88	Basingstoke Rural District	Basingstoke and Deane
Smannell	1,318	9.23	Andover Municipal Borough	Test Valley
Soberton	1,616	23.59	Droxford Rural District	Winchester
Sopley	828	15.13	Ringwood and Fordingbridge Rural District	New Forest
South Warnborough	607	10.85	Hartley Wintney Rural District	Hart
South Wonston	2,811	5.25	Winchester Rural District	Winchester
Southwick and Widley	889	20.40	Droxford Rural District	Winchester
Sparsholt	982	14.70	Winchester Rural District	Winchester
St Mary Bourne	1,298	29.82	Kingsclere and Whitchurch Rural District	Basingstoke and Deane
Steep	1,391	12.27	Petersfield Rural District	East Hampshire
Steventon	207	9.97	Basingstoke Rural District	Basingstoke and Deane
Stockbridge	592	5.86	Romsey and Stockbridge Rural District	Test Valley
Stratfield Saye	288	11.09	Basingstoke Rural District	Basingstoke and Deane
Stratfield Turgis			Basingstoke Rural District	Basingstoke and Deane
Stroud	360	2.08	Petersfield Urban District	East Hampshire
Swanmore	3,017	9.48	Droxford Rural District	Winchester
Sway	3,448	13.18	New Forest Rural District	New Forest
Tadley (town)	11,473	7.30	Kingsclere and Whitchurch Rural District	Basingstoke and Deane
Tangley	557	16.24	Andover Municipal Borough	Test Valley
Thruxton	650	6.33	Andover Rural District	Test Valley
Tichborne	167	12.35	Winchester Rural District	Winchester
Totton and Eling (town)	28,970	11.86	New Forest Rural District	New Forest
Tunworth	224	17.31	Basingstoke Rural District	Basingstoke and Deane
Twyford	1,589	12.72	Winchester Rural District	Winchester
Upham	663	12.33	Droxford Rural District	Winchester
Upper Clatford	1,652	8.92	Andover Rural District	Test Valley
Upton Grey	608	10.47	Basingstoke Rural District	Basingstoke and Deane
Valley Park	7,713	2.60	Romsey and Stockbridge Rural District	Test Valley
Vernhams Dean	552	15.85	Andover Rural District	Test Valley
Warnford	195	12.84	Droxford Rural District	Winchester
Wellow	3,308	15.65	Romsey and Stockbridge Rural District	Test Valley
West End	11,470	12.46	Winchester Rural District	Eastleigh
West Meon	724	14.87	Droxford Rural District	Winchester
West Tisted	165	9.53	Alton Rural District	East Hampshire
West Tytherley	637	16.85	Romsey and Stockbridge Rural District	Test Valley
Weston Corbett			Basingstoke Rural District	Basingstoke and Deane
Weston Patrick			Basingstoke Rural District	Basingstoke and Deane
Wherwell	473	14.69	Andover Rural District	Test Valley
Whitchurch (town)	4,870	26.86	Kingsclere and Whitchurch Rural District	Basingstoke and Deane
Whitehill (town)	13,259	20.08	Alton Rural District	East Hampshire
Whiteley	3,236	5.95	Droxford Rural District	Winchester
Whitsbury	210	7.38	Ringwood and Fordingbridge Rural District	New Forest
Wickham and Knowle	4,299	15.33	Droxford Rural District	Winchester
Wield	254	8.51	Alton Rural District	East Hampshire
Winchfield	664	7.05	Hartley Wintney Rural District	Hart
Winslade			Basingstoke Rural District	Basingstoke and Deane
Wonston	1,446	29.63	Winchester Rural District	Winchester
Woodgreen	489	3.86	Ringwood and Fordingbridge Rural District	New Forest
Wootton St. Lawrence with Ramsdell	636	13.20	Basingstoke Rural District	Basingstoke and Deane
Worldham	354	15.66	Alton Rural District	East Hampshire
Yateley (town)	20,471	11.00	Hartley Wintney Rural District	Hart

== See also ==
- List of civil parishes in England
