= Alton Rural District =

Former local government area in the UK

Alton Rural District is a former council district that comprised the areas of Alton and the larger parishes that surrounded it. It now lies within the present-day East Hampshire district in Hampshire, England. East Hampshire Council assumed responsibilities on 1 April 1974 and comprises the areas of this council and the Petersfield Rural District — it was originally known as the District Council of Petersfield.

Alton Rural District was created when the Local Government Act 1894 came into force from December 1894. It comprised the area of the modern-day parishes of Bentley, Bentworth, Binsted, Chawton, East Tisted, Farringdon, Froyle, Four Marks, Grayshott, Headley, Kingsley, Lasham, Lindford, Medstead, Newton Valence, Ropley, Selborne, Shalden, West Tisted, Wield, Whitehill, and Worldham. The parishes of Alton and Beech were part of Alton Urban District.

Coat of arms of Alton Rural District Council.

== Coat of Arms ==
Alton Rural District Council was issued letters patent for a coat of arms by the College of Arms on 1 August 1957. It was blazoned: Argent issuant from a Base barry wavy of four of the first and Vert a Mount also Vert thereon a Yew Tree proper on a Chief Sable three Lions' Faces jessant-de-Lys Or. And for the Crest on a Wreath Argent and Vert a Greyhound sejant Sable charged on the shoulder with a Cinquefoil Argent and resting the dexter forepaw on an open Book proper edged and bound Or. The motto, 'Alto Nomine', means 'of high renown' in Latin, but is also a pun on 'Alton by name'.

Many of the charges make reference to Selborne, such as the churchyard yew made famous by Gilbert White. The fleurs-de-lys in the lions' mouths are allegedly taken from the arms of the thirteenth century lord of the manor of Selborne, Sir Adam de Gurdon, while the greyhound with cinquefoil in the crest is taken from the arms of the earls of Selborne. More generally, the green and white tinctures are said to refer to the chalk downs and woodlands of the area, the waves to the River Wey, and the open book to both White and Jane Austen, who lived in Chawton between 1809 and 1817.
