= Oliver's Battery (disambiguation) =

Oliver's Battery or Olivers Battery may refer to:

- Oliver's Battery, an earthwork and suburb of Winchester, Hampshire, England
- Oliver's Battery (Tresco), an earthwork at the southern tip of Tresco, Isles of Scilly, England
- Oliver's Battery, an earthwork near Old Alresford, Hampshire, England
- Oliver's Battery, an earthwork at Old Basing, Hampshire, England
