= Alton Abbey =

Former Anglican Benedictine monastery in Hampshire, England

Coordinates: 51.1354°N 1.0359°W

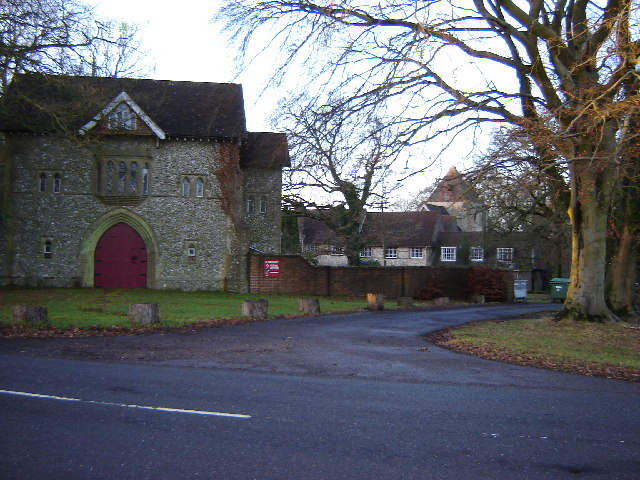
The entrance to Alton Abbey, Hampshire

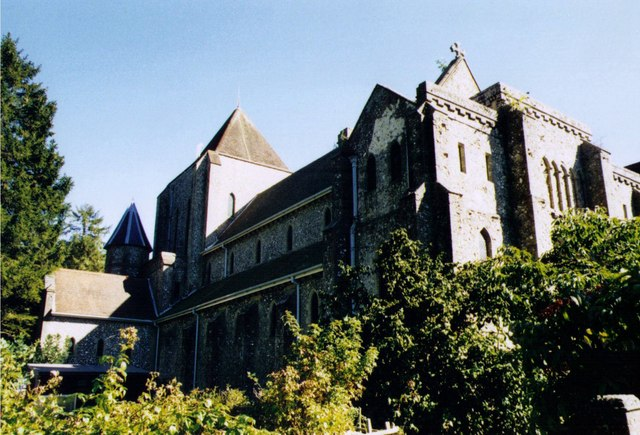
Abbey Church of Our Lady and St John

Alton Abbey was an Anglican Benedictine monastery (founded in 1895, closed in 2024) in the village of Beech, near Alton, Hampshire, England. The abbey was not far from one of Hampshire's highest points, King's Hill (218 m). The community was founded by the Revd Charles Plomer Hopkins in 1884, as the "Society of Saint Paul", in Rangoon (Burma) and Calcutta (India) to work with destitute or distressed merchant seafarers and their chaplains.

Noted for its beauty and tranquility, Alton Abbey had been described in The Times as "the best-kept secret in the Church of England". It closed in 2024.

== History ==
The community was founded by the Revd Charles Plomer Hopkins in 1884, as the Society of Saint Paul, in Rangoon (Burma) and Calcutta (India) to work with destitute or distressed merchant seafarers and their chaplains. The first house was opened in 1894 in Barry Docks, South Wales (now closed) to continue this work.

A quieter house was needed and the site in Beech was acquired in 1895. This was initially used to care for retired or ill seamen in temporary wood and metal buildings. The current buildings were designed by Sir Charles Nicholson, using Tintern Abbey as a model. The first monks did much of the construction using local flint, including a flint and brick Gatehouse (1901). The Abbey church, designed by John Cyril Hawes (flint and brick, built in 1901 to 1907), was dedicated to "Our Lady and Saint John". Hawes also designed the gatehouse. Having observed the Rule of St Benedict from 1893 the community formally adopted it on 28 January 1981.

In 1989 another charity undertook the society's work with seafarers. The community continued to run retreats and courses for the public. The abbey closure was announced in 2024.

== Monks ==
The priority of the monks was the offering of the Liturgy of the Hours and the Conventual Mass. Part of the day was set aside for work in the bakery making communion bread), in the gardens, in the retreat house, writing (painting) icons, or making incense. Those who wished to join the community spend time as an aspirant, postulant and novice while they considered their commitment. With the agreement of the other monks, they made Benedictine Vows of Stability, Conversion of Life, and Obedience for a period of three years. After that three-year period is complete, they made lifelong vows with the agreement of the community.

In September 2010, Dom William Hughes was elected third Abbot of Alton but in 2013 he resigned and the Rt Revd Dom Giles Hill resumed his duties as abbot. The abbey closed in 2024 and the monks dispersed to live elsewhere. The site was put on the market in 2025.. The assets of the Abbey, principally its buildings and site, were valued in 2025 accounts at £3.5million.

== Oblates ==
Oblates were men (lay and ordained, over 18 years of age), who joined the community, but lived outside the monastery. They committed to follow life rules similar to those followed by the monks, based on the Rule of St Benedict and adapted for their specific life circumstances.

== Companions ==
Companions were women and men who made a commitment to regular worship with the monks, either at the Abbey or in their life outside.

== Prayer and church services ==
Except for those times when the whole monastery closed for retreat, there were six services open to the public each day: Morning Prayer (Matins and Lauds), Conventual Mass, Mid-day Office, Evening Prayer (Vespers) and Compline.

== References in literature ==
A thinly disguised version of Alton Abbey appears in Sinister Street (1913) by Sir Compton Mackenzie.
