= Southtown =

Southtown, Southtowns or South Town may refer to:

- "Southtown" (song), from the 2000 rap metal album The Fundamental Elements of Southtown by P.O.D.
- Southtowns, a suburban region in Buffalo, New York
- SouthtownStar, formerly the Daily Southtown, a newspaper in suburban Chicago
- South Town, Hampshire, a hamlet in England
- South Town, setting of Rankin/Bass Animated Entertainment's animated Christmas Special The Year Without a Santa Claus
- South Town, setting of SNK's fighting video game series Fatal Fury and Art of Fighting
- South Town, one of the two municipalities that merged to form Pleasureville, Kentucky
- Southtown, the near south side of San Antonio, Texas
- Southtown Center, a shopping center in Bloomington, Minnesota
