= Basil Goldstone =

British Liberal Party activist

- Goldstone in 1979
- Born: October 1909; Twickenham
- Died: November 1988 (aged 79); King's Lynn
- Occupation: Political activist

Basil Eric Goldstone (October 1909 – November 1988) was an English Liberal Party activist. He served for some years on Kingsclere and Whitchurch Rural District Council. He was the founder of the Liberal Animal Welfare Group.

== Career ==
Goldstone was born in Twickenham. He studied at Richmond Hill School and Dover College before joining the Royal Air Force. He stood repeatedly for the Liberal Party in general elections, but was never elected: in Hendon in 1935, Petersfield in 1945, Dover in 1950 and 1959, Basingstoke in 1964, Peterborough in 1966, Norfolk South in 1970, and Harlow in February and October 1974. He was more successful locally as he was elected in 1961 to the Kingsclere and Whitchurch Rural District Council by 450 to 50 votes.

He moved to King's Lynn in 1965 as a hospital catering officer and won a Lynn Town Council seat in 1971. In 1976–77, he served as president of the Liberal Party. He was president of Lynn Liberals and involved with St Margaret's Residents' Association which provided homes for the elderly.

In May 1988, an American red oak tree was planted near the Red Mount in The Walks park in King's Lynn in recognition of his service to the Liberal Party.

== Animal welfare ==
A long-term supporter of animal welfare, in 1978, he proposed wide-ranging animal protection legislation, which the party voted to support. In 1980, Goldstone founded the Liberal Animal Welfare Group. Richard D. Ryder has commented that Goldstone "rapidly made the Liberal Party the most active of the four major parties in the whole field of animal welfare".

Goldstone was an opponent of fox hunting and in 1986 criticized Henry Bellingham's arguments that fox hunting is a humane way to kill.

== Death ==
Goldstone died at his home in King's Lynn, aged 79.

Party political offices
Preceded by Margaret Wingfield	President of the Liberal Party; 1976–1977	Succeeded by Gruffydd Evans
