= Jacob Hagen =

Australian politician

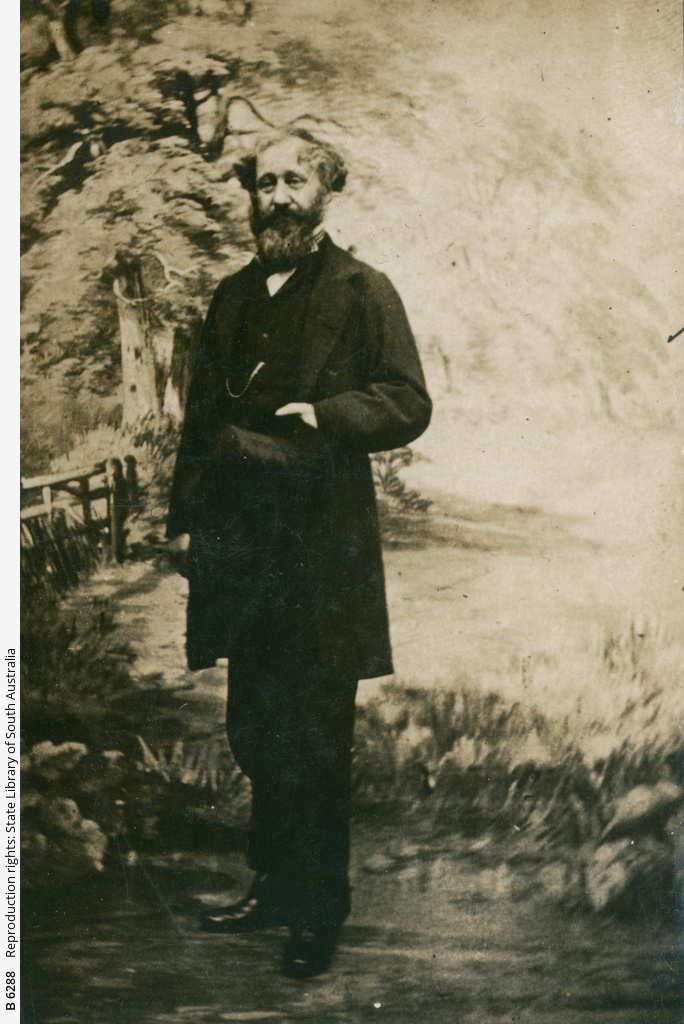
Jacob Hagen c. 1868

Jacob Hagen (29 January 1809 – 24 January 1870) was a businessman involved in many business ventures in the colony of South Australia. He served in the Legislative Council from September 1843 to February 1851.

== History ==
Jacob Hagen was born in Mill Street, Bermondsey a son of Jacob Hagen (1776–1843) and his wife Mary Hagen née Fell (1785–1858) who married in 1807. He was educated in Southgate, Middlesex.

Hagen arrived in the colony of South Australia in December 1839 aboard the William Barrass. He purchased part of fellow-Quaker Barton Hack's selection at Echunga. He put Walter Duffield, a fellow-passenger on the trip out, in charge of the estate and was soon growing grapes; his wine was some of the first produced in the Colony. The Hagen Arms, opened in the area around 1853, and which still stands today, was named for him.

He moved back to England in 1853 where he bought Ropley House (then known as New House) in Ropley, Hampshire along with a large amount of land known as the "New House Estate". It was on his newly acquired land that the Watercress Line was built, between 1861 and 1865.

Business

He was briefly a partner with his father in the import business as Hagen & Son. Their ship Lalla Rookh took whale oil and some of South Australia's first wool export to London in 1840. He was a partner with brother-in-law John Baker, also John Bentham Neales, Capt. John Hart and others in the Adelaide Auction Company. Hagen and his brother Edward had a share in Capt. Hart's barque Augustus, which he brought to Adelaide with passengers in December 1843. He shared with Baker a shipping business involving the barque East London and in the Montacute copper venture with John Hart. Hagen, Baker, and Hart operated the whaler John Pirie and whaling station at Trial Bay, some 25 miles (40 km) south-east of Streaky Bay. They also had a timber-getting and iron smelting venture. Hagen and Baker were both candidates at the same City Council election, both members of the Agricultural and Horticultural Society, both SA directors of the Australian Mining Company (his brother Edward Hagen (1816–1895) was an England director). They were both on the Board of Magistrates, the Central Road Board, and directors of the Marine Insurance Company. Hagen was a director of other institutions such as the Church of England Life Assurance Institution, of London.

He made at least two business trips back to Britain during his time in Australia: returning on the Benares in July 1841 and the second, with his new wife Mary, when he also attended a mining company meeting, returning aboard the Royal George in July 1847.

Parliament

Hagen was appointed by Governor Grey to the second Legislative Council in September 1843 and sat until February 1851. Grey came to regret his choice: Hagen took his role seriously, and would not back down when he knew he was right. He opposed many of Grey's measures and after an application by Hagen and Baker for mining rights to some copper-bearing land was refused, he accused Grey of "extremely corrupt conduct". As an outcome, the government in England moved Grey on to another position in New Zealand. Always a friend to the speculator, Hagen grew more right-wing. He supported measures to entrench the privileges of the squatters, and criticised the indigent poor for their dependence on Government charity. He proposed a system of inherited titles along the peerage system of the United Kingdom (later dubbed "bunyip aristocracy"), and mapping of electorates (in America dubbed "Gerrymander") in such a way as to give greater weight to the squatters' votes.

In 1853 Hagen, his wife and some of the family left for England, ostensibly for a few years but in fact never returned. He retained ownership of the Echunga property, whose tenants he dealt with in a tight-fisted and curmudgeonly way, but his expenses exceeded his income and by the time of his death, in Ropley, Hampshire, his wealth had diminished to around £8,000, in today's values perhaps around $5,000,000.

== Religion ==
Jacob was originally of the Quaker faith, which might have been a bar to his appointment to the Legislative Council but for intercession by friends in high places. After his second marriage, which was celebrated by the (Anglican) Rev. James Farrell at St John's Church, Adelaide in 1844, he was ostracised by the local Society of Friends.

== Family ==
Jacob married Jane Greenwood (15 August 1813 – 9 March 1836), daughter of Robert Greenwood and Elizabeth Benwell, on 19 March 1834 in Chelmsford, Essex.

- Mary Elizabeth Hagen (20 December 1834 – 28 August 1835) was born in Bermondsey and died in Exeter, Devon.

Jacob married again, to Mary Baker (11 November 1816 – 8 January 1873) on 23 January 1844 in Adelaide, South Australia. Mary was a daughter of Richard Chaffey Baker and Mary Anstice, and a sister of John Baker. They had one surviving child:

- Marianna Sophia Hagen (11 January 1852 – 26 February 1932) was born in Adelaide and removed to England with her parents, owning considerable property in South Australia. She never married, had no children, and died in Ropley, Hampshire.
