= Dunley, Hampshire =

Hamlet in Hampshire, England

Coordinates: 51.278418°N 1.357856°W

Dunley
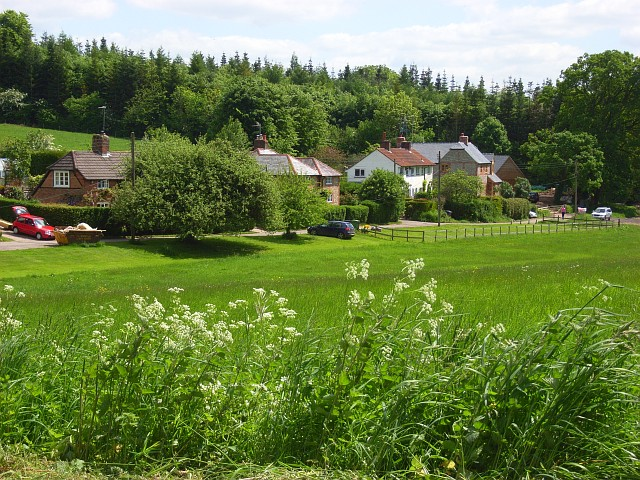
- Cottages in Dunley

- Location within Hampshire
- OS grid reference: SU4488653448
- Civil parish: Litchfield and Woodcott
- District: Basingstoke and Deane
- Shire county: Hampshire
- Region: South East
- Country: England
- Sovereign state: United Kingdom
- Post town: WHITCHURCH
- Postcode district: RG28
- Dialling code: 01264
- Police: Hampshire and Isle of Wight
- Fire: Hampshire and Isle of Wight
- Ambulance: South Central
- UK Parliament: North West Hampshire

Dunley is a hamlet in the Basingstoke and Deane district of Hampshire, England. It is in the civil parish of Litchfield and Woodcott. Its nearest town is Whitchurch, which lies approximately 3.7 miles (6.0 km) south-east from the village.
