= King's Hill, Hampshire =

Hill in Hampshire, England

King's Hill

Highest point
- Elevation: 218 m (715 ft)
- Prominence: 46 m (151 ft)
- Parent peak: Butser Hill
- Listing: TuMP
- Coordinates: 51°08′01″N 1°02′27″W

Geography
- Location: Bentworth, Hampshire
- Parent range: Hampshire Downs
- OS grid: SU672375
- Topo map: OS Landranger

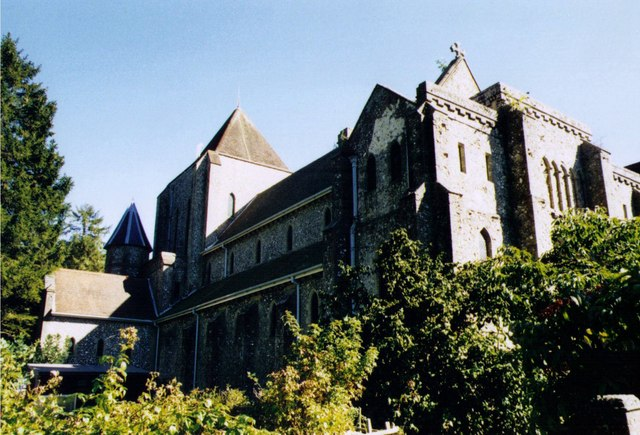
Alton Abbey near the summit of King's Hill

King's Hill is one of the highest points in the county of Hampshire, England. It is part of the Hampshire Downs and reaches 218 metres (715 ft) above sea level. Its prominence of 46 metres qualifies it as one of England's TuMPs.

King's Hill is situated in the parish of Bentworth. It lies on the Abbey Road between the villages of Medstead and Beech. To the northeast is Alton Abbey. Chawton Park Wood lies to the south of the open hilltop.
