= Lower Woodcott =

Village in Hampshire, England

Coordinates: 51.2897°N 1.3646°W

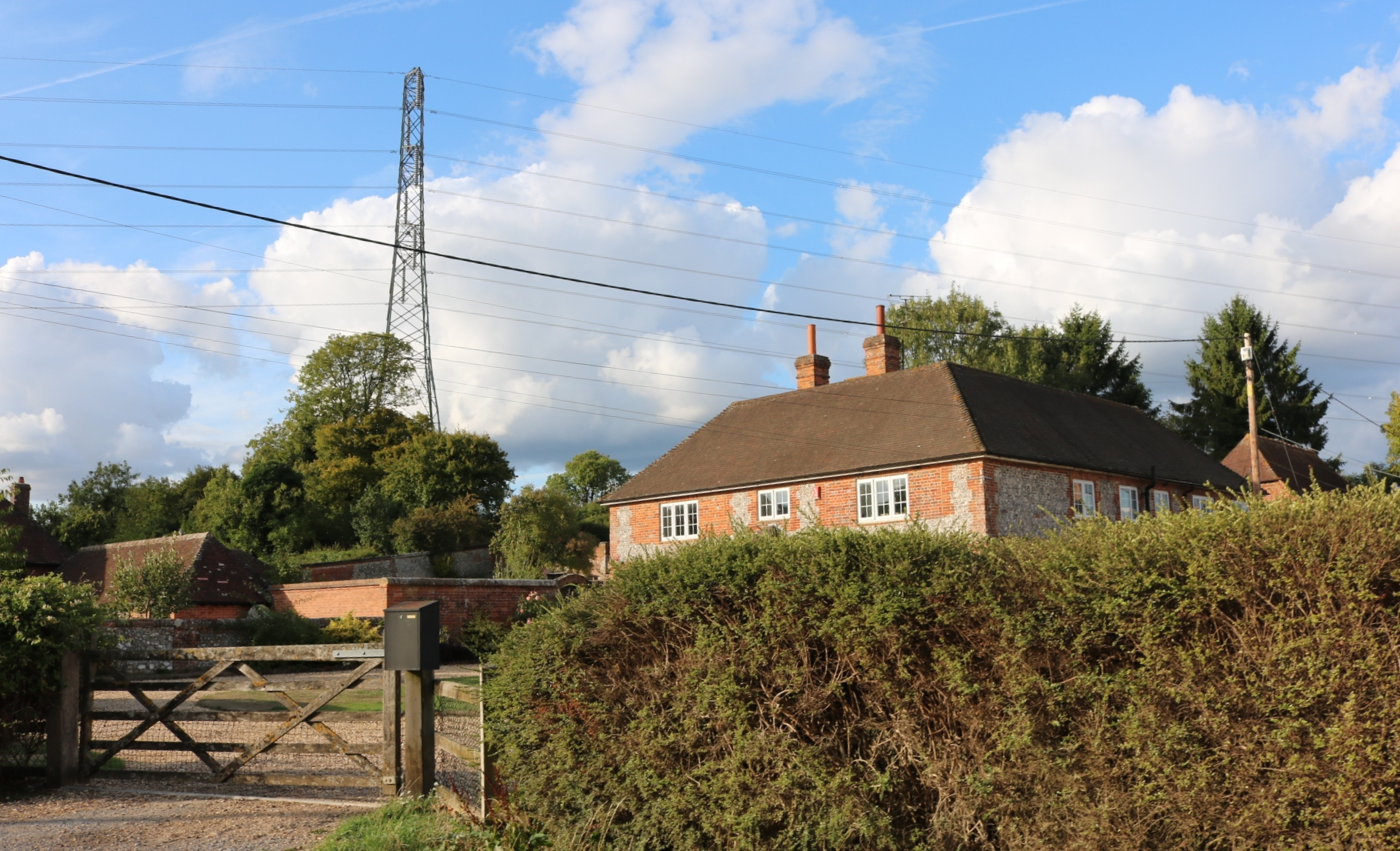
- Lower Woodcott Farm

- Location within Hampshire
- OS grid reference: SU4440454702
- Civil parish: Litchfield and Woodcott
- District: Basingstoke and Deane
- Shire county: Hampshire
- Region: South East
- Country: England
- Sovereign state: United Kingdom
- Post town: WHITCHURCH
- Postcode district: RG28
- Dialling code: 01256
- Police: Hampshire and Isle of Wight
- Fire: Hampshire and Isle of Wight
- Ambulance: South Central
- UK Parliament: Basingstoke

Lower Woodcott is a small village in the Basingstoke and Deane district of Hampshire, England. Its nearest town is Whitchurch, which lies approximately 4.3 miles (6.7 km) south-east from the village.

== Governance ==
The village is part of the civil parish of Litchfield and Woodcott, and is part of the Burghclere, Highclere and St Mary Bourne ward of Basingstoke and Deane borough council. The borough council is a Non-metropolitan district of Hampshire County Council.
