= Soldridge =

Hamlet in Hampshire, England

Coordinates: 51.11216°N 1.06932°W

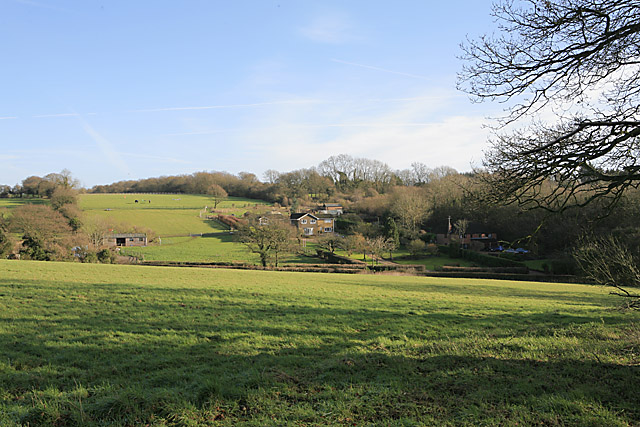
- Grosvenor Road seen from Gullet Lane

- Location within Hampshire
- OS grid reference: SU652351
- Civil parish: Medstead
- District: East Hampshire
- Shire county: Hampshire
- Region: South East
- Country: England
- Sovereign state: United Kingdom
- Police: Hampshire and Isle of Wight
- Fire: Hampshire and Isle of Wight
- Ambulance: South Central
- UK Parliament: East Hampshire

Soldridge is a hamlet in the East Hampshire district of Hampshire, England. It is 5 miles (8 km) southwest of Alton, just off the A31 road.

The nearest railway station is the restored Medstead & Four Marks station on the Watercress Line, trains from which connect with the nearest national rail station 5 miles (8 km) to the northeast, at Alton.

== History ==
Soldridge is first mentioned in 1233 as Solrigge meaning the muddy pond on the ridge. It is mentioned frequently throughout medieval documents, in relation to nearby Medstead, as a farm likely stood there.
