= Basingstoke Rural District =

Former local government area in the UK

Basingstoke Rural District is a former council district that comprised the areas of Basingstoke and the parishes that surrounded the large town. It now lies within the present-day Basingstoke and Deane district in Hampshire, England. Basingstoke and Deane Council assumed responsibilities on 1 April 1974 and comprises the areas of this council and the Kingsclere and Whitchurch Rural District.
