= Upper Woodcott =

Village and parish in Hampshire, England

Coordinates: 51.2918°N 1.3789°W

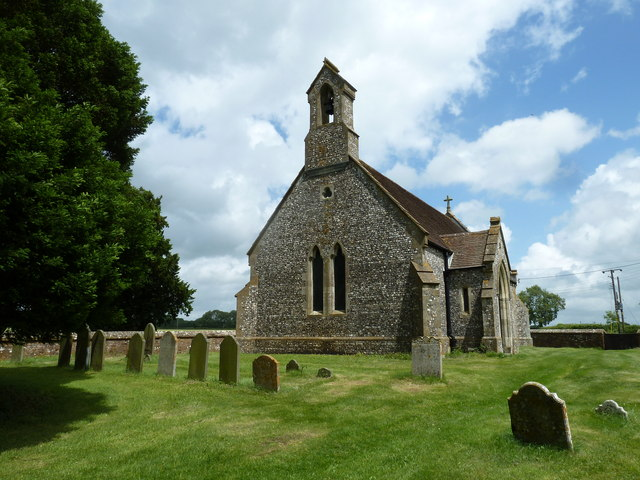

- Location within Hampshire
- OS grid reference: SU4340854927
- Civil parish: Litchfield and Woodcott
- District: Basingstoke and Deane
- Shire county: Hampshire
- Region: South East
- Country: England
- Sovereign state: United Kingdom
- Post town: WHITCHURCH
- Postcode district: RG28 7
- Dialling code: 01256
- Police: Hampshire and Isle of Wight
- Fire: Hampshire and Isle of Wight
- Ambulance: South Central
- UK Parliament: Basingstoke

Upper Woodcott or just Woodcott is a village and former civil parish, now in the parish of Litchfield and Woodcott, in the Basingstoke and Deane district of Hampshire, England. It is situated in the North Wessex Downs Area of Outstanding Natural Beauty. Its nearest town is Whitchurch, which lies approximately 4 1/2 miles (7 km) south-east from the hamlet. In 1931 the parish had a population of 87. On 1 April 1932 the parish was abolished to form "Litchfield and Woodcott".
