= North Street, Hampshire =

Hamlet in Hampshire, England

Coordinates: 51.096°N 1.082°W

North Street
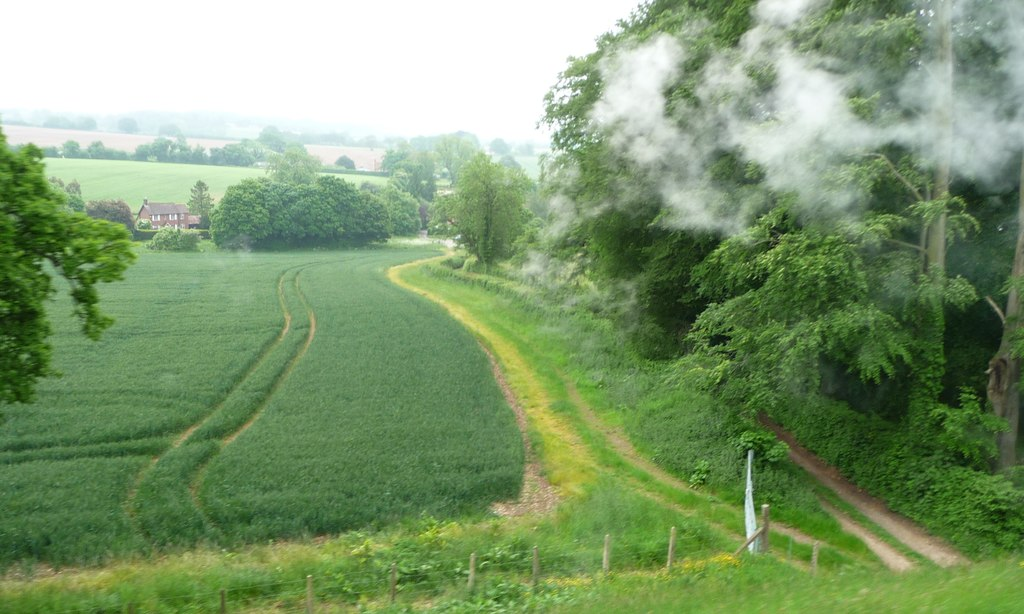
- Rookwood Lane, North Street

- Location within Hampshire
- OS grid reference: SU644333
- Civil parish: Ropley
- District: East Hampshire
- Shire county: Hampshire
- Region: South East
- Country: England
- Sovereign state: United Kingdom
- Post town: ALRESFORD
- Postcode district: SO24
- Dialling code: 01962
- Police: Hampshire and Isle of Wight
- Fire: Hampshire and Isle of Wight
- Ambulance: South Central
- UK Parliament: East Hampshire

North Street is a hamlet in the parish of Ropley in Hampshire, England. The hamlet lies on the A31 road from Alton to Winchester.

== Etymology ==
North Street is first recorded in 1347 as 'North st.' . Later spellings are 'Northstreete' in 1521 and 'Northstrete' in 1568. The name derives from Old English 'strǽt', meaning a settlement around a road or lane. The 'north' element refers to its placement north of Ropley.

== History ==
North Street is one of the few areas of Ropley where Romano-British settlement is known. It is unclear what sort of settlement, but metal detecting groups have uncovered a large amount of Roman finds, including pottery, coins, brooches and masonry, both to the Northeast and west of the hamlet. There is also a Romano-British enclosure recorded here.

== Notable buildings ==
- Manor Farmhouse, a late 18th-century building with later expansions and with brick walls in Flemish bond.
- Turnpike Cottage, a 17th-century cottage with later 18th-century additions.
- Ropelia Cottage, a 17th-century cottage with late 20th-century renovations.
- North Street Farmhouse, a 1730 cottage with a 1925 casement.
