= Kitwood =

Hamlet in Hampshire, England

Coordinates: 51.100000°N 1.05°W

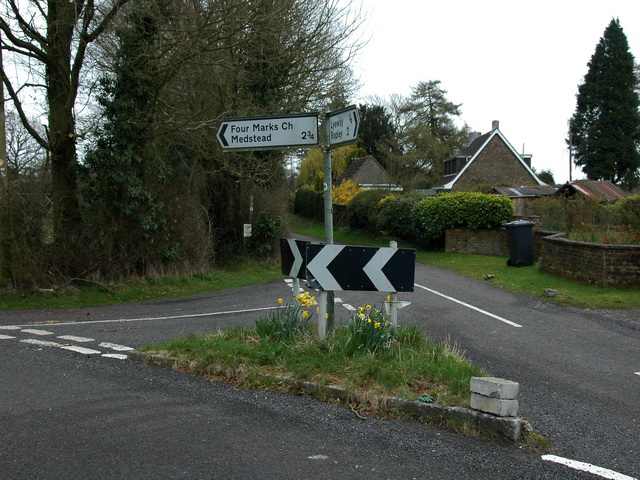
- Road junction in the centre of Kitwood

- Location within Hampshire
- OS grid reference: SU6661633840
- Civil parish: Four Marks
- District: East Hampshire
- Shire county: Hampshire
- Region: South East
- Country: England
- Sovereign state: United Kingdom
- Post town: Alton
- Postcode district: GU34
- Dialling code: 01420
- Police: Hampshire and Isle of Wight
- Fire: Hampshire and Isle of Wight
- Ambulance: South Central

Kitwood is a hamlet in the parish of Four Marks, Hampshire, England. It is in the south east of the Parish and has been part of Four Marks since its creation in 1932. Prior to this, it was part of Ropley Parish.

Although the settlement was located at the junction of Kitwood road and Swelling, as is visible in older maps, the settlement now spreads all the way from Swelling hill pond to Kitwood farm near Hawthorn Road.

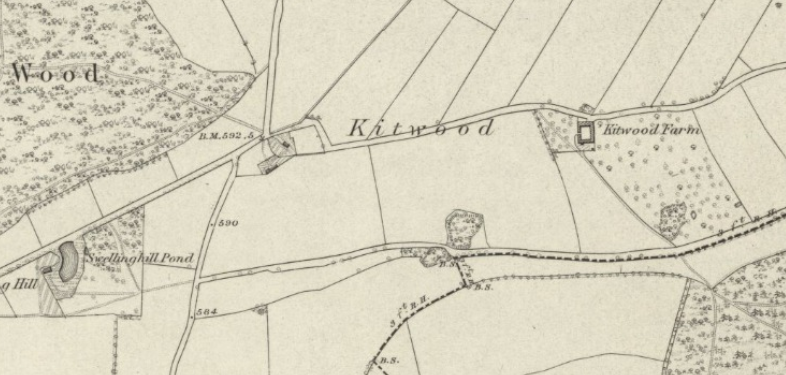
Map of Kitwood from 1870, showing the then newly built Kitwood Farm to the east

== Etymology ==
First mentioned in AD 1403 as kyteswode meaning the "Kite('s) wood" from Old English 'cýta' and 'wudu' . The actual woodland that is referred to stood somewhere near where Kitwood Plantation is nowadays.

== History ==
The earliest signs of human activity in Kitwood are a number of Mesolithic flint implements that have been found near the hamlet since the 2000s. Later evidence of Roman activity may also be present nearby as it has been suggested that Swelling Lane, which runs through the hamlet toward Ropley, is the remains of a Roman Road. However, no conclusive evidence exists of this.

=== Medieval ===
Archaeological evidence of activity in around the hamlet is minimal with only a few medieval potsherds found around the area. Since the early 1400s, Kitwood is also regularly mentioned in legal documents relating to Ropley. Kitwood Lane is recorded in a court roll record from 1413 as "kitteswodeweye" and during a hedgerow dating survey, commissioned for the Four Marks Village Design Statement, the hedgerow on either side of Kitwood Lane was dated to "approximately 800 years old". The wealth of records suggests significant activity in the area since the 1400s but little evidence of settlement. It is known that since the 13th Century there was settlement near Old Down Wood, northwest of the Hamlet.

=== Post Medieval ===
Long, parallel field boundaries running on a NE-SW alignment are visible north of Kitwood Farm are said to have been laid as a result of the inclosure act of which Ropley was the first parish to be enclosed by act of Parliament, the Ropley Inclosure Act 1709 (8 Ann. c. 16 Pr.).

=== Kitwood Farm ===
This farm, not to be confused with the more modern 19th century farmhouse that sits to the east of the main hamlet, was an 18th-century farmhouse that existed from around the early 1700s up to about 1908/9 when it disappeared from maps. The farmhouse stood roughly where Autumn Cottage on Kitwood Lane stands now.
