= Whitchurch Rural District, Hampshire =

Former local government area in the UK

Coordinates: 51.230°N 1.339°W

Whitchurch was a rural district in Hampshire, England from 1894 to 1932.

It was formed under the Local Government Act 1894 based on the Whitchurch rural sanitary district. It was abolished in 1932 under a County Review Order and went to form part of the Kingsclere and Whitchurch Rural District.
