= Ropley Dean =

Village in Hampshire, England

Coordinates: 51.08279°N 1.10296°W

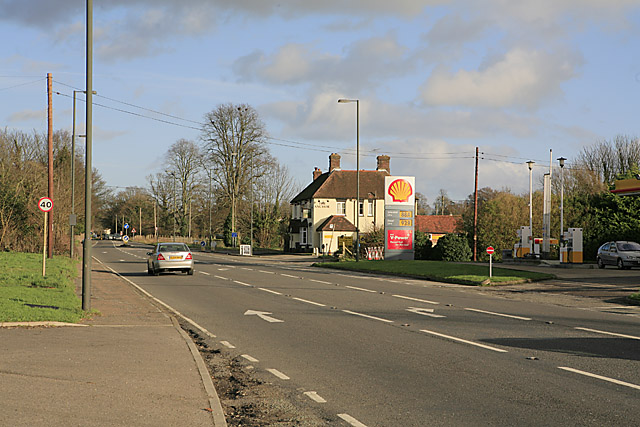
- The Thai House (formerly the Anchor Inn), now a steakhouse, Ropley Dean

- Location within Hampshire
- OS grid reference: SU629318
- Civil parish: Ropley
- District: East Hampshire
- Shire county: Hampshire
- Region: South East
- Country: England
- Sovereign state: United Kingdom
- Police: Hampshire and Isle of Wight
- Fire: Hampshire and Isle of Wight
- Ambulance: South Central
- UK Parliament: East Hampshire

Ropley Dean also Dene or simply The Dean / Dene is a hamlet in the parish of Ropley, Hampshire, England. It is 7.3 miles (11.7 km) southwest of Alton.

North of the hamlet is the restored railway station on the Watercress Line. Trains from here connect with the nearest national rail station 7.3 miles (11.7 km) to the northeast, at Alton.

== History and name ==
This Hamlet is relatively modern, prior to the later 19th century it only consisted of a couple of farms. Its name is first recorded in 1410 as L'Dene from Old English denu meaning valley. The valley its name is in reference to is that which the A31 runs down.

It has been postulated that the hamlet gave its name to an older name of the River Alre as a record from 1447 describes the river as the Denewater. The rivers current name is recorded for the first time over 100 years later in 1586. Hence it is theorised that Denewater was one of the original names for the Alre as the river used to flow further up valley, nearer to the hamlet. The valley in which Ropley Dean is situated, still floods after raining and can occasionally bear a stream.

== The Anchor Inn ==
The Anchor Inn also The Anchor was a pub in Ropley Dean situated at the corner of Petersfield Road and Winchester road open since at least the early 19th century- being first recorded in 1839. The building itself is little older. By the end of the 20th century the pub closed and has since been home to a variety of businesses including a Thai Curry restaurant and a Steakhouse.
