= Hattingley =

Hamlet in Hampshire, England

Coordinates: 51.131°N 1.083°W

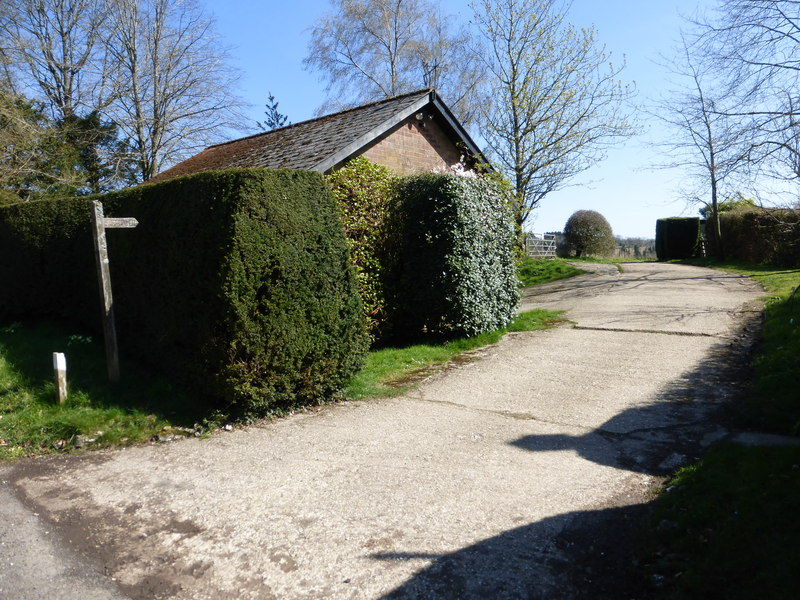
- Footpath off Hattingley Road

- Location within Hampshire
- OS grid reference: SU652351
- Civil parish: Medstead
- District: East Hampshire
- Shire county: Hampshire
- Region: South East
- Country: England
- Sovereign state: United Kingdom
- Police: Hampshire and Isle of Wight
- Fire: Hampshire and Isle of Wight
- Ambulance: South Central
- UK Parliament: East Hampshire

Hattingley is a small hamlet in the East Hampshire district of Hampshire, England.

== Geography ==
It is 5 miles (8.0 km) southwest of Alton, just off the A31 road.

== History ==
It was once in the large civil parish of neighbouring Bentworth, however it is now situated in Medstead.

The nearest railway station is the restored Medstead & Four Marks station on the Watercress Line, trains from which connect with the nearest national rail station 4.6 miles (7.4 km) to the northeast, at Alton.
