= Medstead =

Village and parish in Hampshire, England

Coordinates: 51.12948°N 1.06548°W

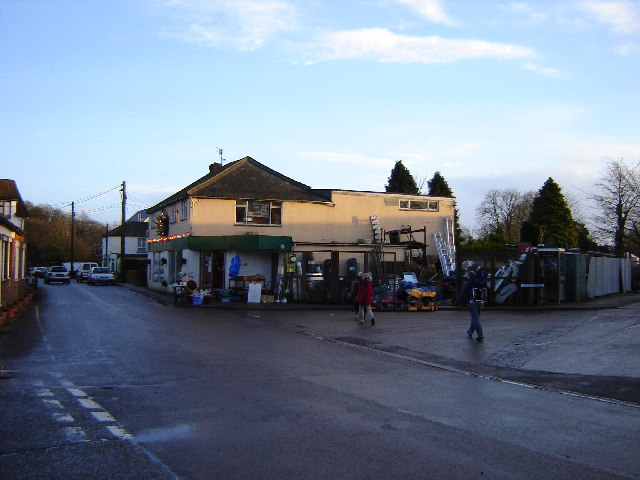
- Medstead village centre

- Location within Hampshire
- Population: 2,036 (2011 Census)
- OS grid reference: SU654371
- Civil parish: Medstead
- District: East Hampshire
- Shire county: Hampshire
- Region: South East
- Country: England
- Sovereign state: United Kingdom
- Post town: ALTON
- Postcode district: GU34
- Dialling code: 01420
- Police: Hampshire and Isle of Wight
- Fire: Hampshire and Isle of Wight
- Ambulance: South Central
- UK Parliament: East Hampshire

Medstead is a village and civil parish in the East Hampshire district of Hampshire, England. Its nearest town is Alton, which lies 4.3 miles (6.9 km) northeast of the village. According to the 2011 census, the village had a population of 2,036 people. The parish covers an area of 1,536 acres (622 ha) and has an average elevation of approximately 600 feet (180 m) above sea level. One of the county's high points at 716 feet (218 m), King's Hill, runs through Medstead and Bentworth.

The village church was first mentioned as a chapel in the Domesday Survey of 1086 and was soon replaced by a Norman church. The village has six Grade II listed buildings, including the 12th century St Andrew's Church and its war memorial, a farmhouse and a Victorian wheelhouse with a working donkey wheel. Medstead was one of the first villages in the United Kingdom to receive broadband.

The parish contains three individual hamlets; South Town, Soldridge and Hattingley. Medstead also has its own restored railway station on the Watercress Line, services from which connect with the nearest national rail station 4.6 miles (7.4 km) at Alton railway station.

== Etymology ==
Medstead is first recorded indirectly in the Domesday Survey of 1086 in the entry for the Manor of Alresford where 3 Churches are mentioned situated in the manor.

It is first explicitly mentioned in 1202 as Medested. Its name derives from the Old English words mǽd and stede and means the Farmstead on (or by) the meadow.

A common misconception of the meaning of the village's name is that it referred to its situation mid-way between the settlements of Alton and Alresford. In reality this theorised etymology is totally false as names referencing their location in terms of distance to other places are very rare.

== History ==
=== Prehistory to the Roman Occupation ===
The earliest evidence of human activity in Medstead consists of a number of Mesolithic flint implements found in the north of the village.

Flint tools from the Neolithic have also been collected all around the village. During a pre-construction archaeological excavation in the Southwest of the village a small pit was uncovered which contained a flint arrowhead in addition to a potsherd which dated to the Middle Neolithic. This suggests nearby settlement during the Neolithic.

Two Tumuli burial grounds dating to the Bronze Age in addition to individual finds of bronze axe heads suggest significant settlement in this time. A ring-shaped earthwork which lies near to the Castle of Comfort pub just North of the village may be one of the only Iron Age ringforts in East Hampshire however little to no research has been undertaken on the site so its date can not be confirmed and may be medieval in date.

Finds of Roman pottery and coins are numerous in and around Medstead and suggest settlement. Supposedly, according to local hear-say a mosaic was uncovered near to the Castle of Comfort pub, however this is unproven and not further evidenced.

=== The Middle Ages to the 18th century ===
Following the baptism of Cynegils of Wessex in 635, an area of land was granted to the church at Winchester. The area became known as the "Liberty of Alresford" and contained parts of present-day Old Alresford, New Alresford and Medstead.In 1160, St Andrew's Church was built on the existing site of the chapel and some parts of the original chapel were enlarged.

A map showing the extent of Medstead's parish in 1881.

Medstead Manor can be traced from the 14th century. In 1316, the Bishop of Winchester held the manor of Medstead and all adjacent land until 1346 when ownership was transferred. Seven years later, Martin de Hertham and his wife, Isabel, passed control of lands, rents and taxes in Medstead to William de Overton. He was followed by his son, also named William, who held lands in Medstead as well as a settlement called "Tadelyng" in 1428.

By the 18th century, Edward Rookes held Medstead Manor, although it is uncertain if he purchased or inherited it. In 1749, Rookes sold the manor to Sir William Jolliffe for £1400 (equivalent to £267,049 in 2025), after which the manor of Medstead disappeared from records.

In 1852, The British Gazetteer described Medstead as:

Medstead, Hants, a parish in the hundred of Fawley, union of Alton, Fawley division of the county 49 miles from London (coach road 51), 4 from Alton, 6 from Alresford. South Western Rail, through Guildford to Alton, thence 4 miles: from Derby, through London, etc., 181 miles. Money orders issued at Alton: London letters delivered 8 a.m.: post closes 6 1/2 p.m. In the church there are some old Norman pillars of beautiful workmanship, and in an excellent state of preservation.The living (St. Andrew) is a rectory, annexed to that of Old Alresford, in the diocese of Winchester: present net income, £580: patron, Bishop of Winchester: present incumbent, Earl of Guildford, 1797: contains 2,530 acres: 78 houses: population in 1841, 450: ass' prop' £2,402: poor rates in 1848, £314.

=== Enclosure ===
Medstead suffered two private parliamentary enclosure acts: the Old Alresford Inclosure Act 1735 (9 Geo. 2 c. 19 Pr.) enclosing Stankham and Soldridge Commons; and the Medstead and Bentworth Inclosure Act 1798 (38 Geo. 3. c. 35 Pr.), a joint bill, but separate allotment, with the adjoining village at Bentworth.

The first Medstead parliamentary award was made in March, 1736, and was a rapid piece of work. The wording and arrangements showed that careful attention had been paid to its contested parent in Ropley in 1709. It was planned to cover an estimated 500 acres although the exercise eventually scooped just over 650 acres, an increase of about a third. The primary protagonists were the lord of the manor of Old Alresford, Benjamin Hoadly, also bishop of Winchester and patron of the rectory of Old Alresford, which included Medstead; and John Shackleforth, lord of its subsidiary or 'inferior' manor of Medstead. This pair were closely supported by the Warden and Fellows of Winchester College, the President and Fellows of Magdalen College in Oxford and Joseph Soley, Rector of Old Alresford. Of course, the wardenship and the rectory were both in the gift of the bishop.

The second Medstead award of just over 231 acres was made in 1799. There is a sense of unfinished business from the first inclosure act, the Old Alresford Inclosure Act 1735. The aftermath of this second foray gutted Medstead of its commercial life and blighted the village. The charge was led by the gentleman trustees of a deceased Henry Drummond, esquire and lord of the manor, his nephew Charles Drummond and George Wheatley. This was the first local enclosure without a prominent part for a bishop of Winchester, now Brownlow North, but his son stood in his place: Francis, the rector of Old Alresford, worth £560 a year, whose remit included the chapelries of New Alresford, £250, and Medstead, £600.

=== Victorian to present day ===
Medstead's railway station was first opened in August 1868. The 1881 census for the Alton Union Workhouse included three paupers born in Medstead (then named 'Medsted'), including an 86 year old widow labourer, a 63 year old 'disability lunatic' who served as a domestic servant and a 26 year old 'disability idiot'. Medstead's parish boundary was altered in 1973 after the ecclesiastical parish of Four Marks was created. An underground bunker for the Royal Observer Corps was built in the village in 1963 and was continuously used until its closure in 1968.

Medstead received broadband internet in 2003, becoming one of the first villages in the United Kingdom to be connected. In 2018, Medstead's upgrade to Superfast broadband was completed as part of a county-wide initiative.

== Transport ==
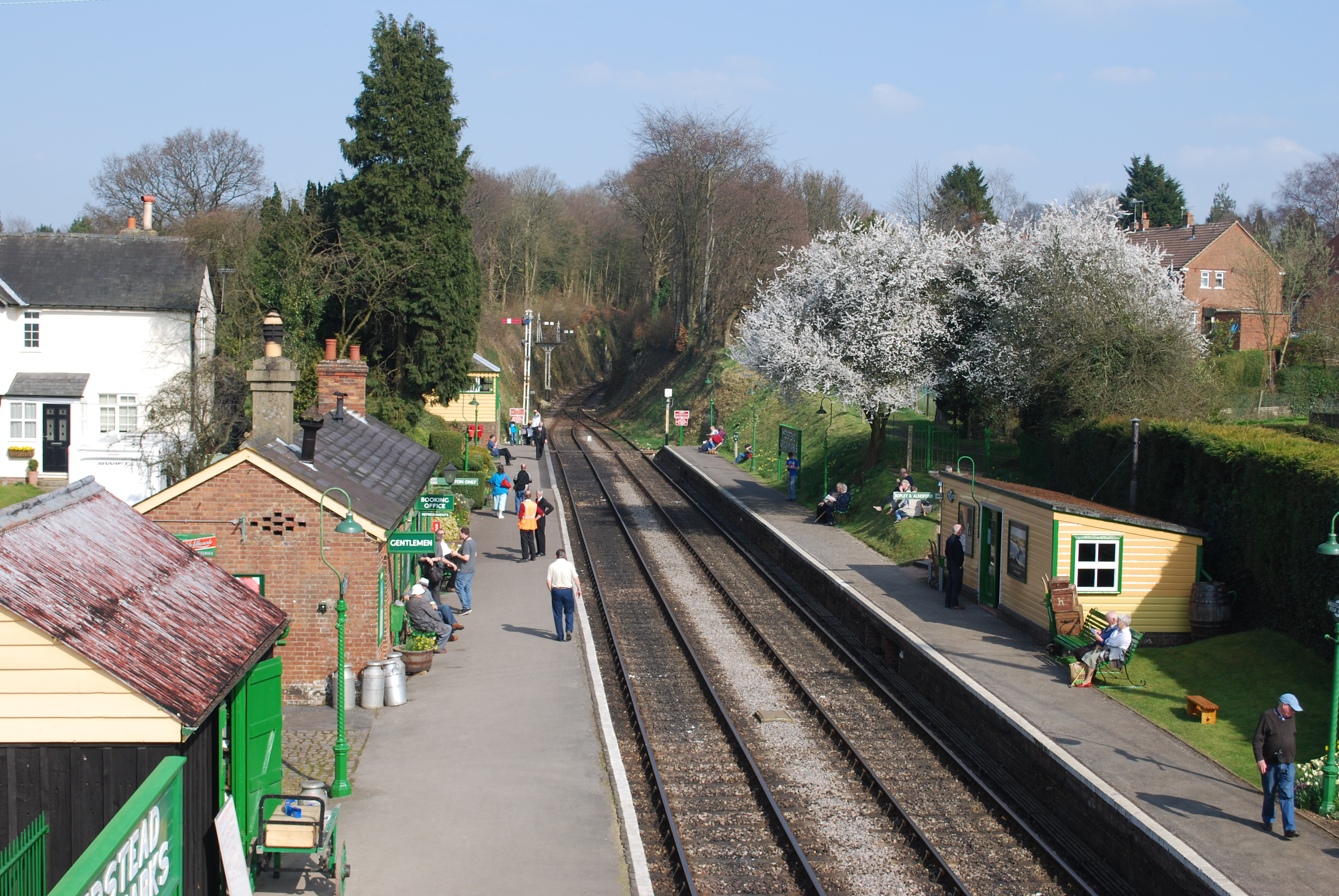
Medstead and Four Marks railway station from the east.

Medstead's railway station was first opened in August 1868 and was renamed to Medstead and Four Marks railway station on 1 October 1937. Having closed in 1973, the station was restored and re-opened in May 1983, following the reopening of the associated Watercress Line from New Alresford to Ropley having re-opened six years earlier in 1977; the decision was taken by Mid Hants Railway to restore the entire railway so that it could run its course to the town of Alton. Around 1.5 miles (2.4 km) of second hand track panels were purchased from Eastleigh for the Medstead and Four Marks section. The surviving buildings at the railway station were dilapidated, with one writer from a magazine suggesting they be demolished and replaced by a bus shelter. As the track was relaid at the station, a replacement wooden signal box was obtained from Wilton and placed into position near the track.

== Geography ==
Medstead is located in the eastern central part of Hampshire in South East England, 4.3 miles (6.9 km) southwest of Alton, its nearest town. The parish covers an area of 1,536 acres (622 ha) and has an average elevation of approximately 600 feet (180 m) above sea level. Before parts of the parish were ceded to Four Marks in 1973, Medstead's parish contained 2,484 acres (1,005 ha) and its highest point was 697 feet (212 m). The landscape is dominated by farms and woodland such as Medstead Grange, Imber Farm and Bushy Leaze Wood. The parish contains three individual hamlets: South Town, Soldridge and Hattingley. One of the Hampshire's high points at 716 feet (218 m), King's Hill, runs through Medstead and Bentworth.

=== Climate ===
Due to its location in south central England and its proximity to the sea, the average maximum temperature in January is 7.2 °C (45 °F) with the average minimum being 1.6 °C (35 °F). The average maximum temperature in July is 21.9 °C (71 °F), with the average minimum being 12.5 °C (55 °F). The village gets around 755 millimetres (29.7 in) of rain a year, with a minimum of 1 mm (0.04 in) of rain reported on 103 days a year.

Climate data for Odiham weather station (nearest to Medstead), Odiham, elevation: 9 metres (30 feet) (1981–2010)
| Month | Jan | Feb | Mar | Apr | May | Jun | Jul | Aug | Sep | Oct | Nov | Dec | Year |
|---|---|---|---|---|---|---|---|---|---|---|---|---|---|
| Record high °C (°F) | 14.8 (58.6) | 16.4 (61.5) | 20.8 (69.4) | 27.1 (80.8) | 28.2 (82.8) | 33.5 (92.3) | 35.6 (96.1) | 36.1 (97.0) | 29.6 (85.3) | 24.2 (75.6) | 17.7 (63.9) | 14.4 (57.9) | 36.1 (97.0) |
| Mean maximum °C (°F) | 12.3 (54.1) | 12.8 (55.0) | 15.4 (59.7) | 20.7 (69.3) | 23.5 (74.3) | 27.8 (82.0) | 29.2 (84.6) | 28.5 (83.3) | 25.0 (77.0) | 18.3 (64.9) | 14.2 (57.6) | 12.5 (54.5) | 31.1 (88.0) |
| Mean daily maximum °C (°F) | 7.2 (45.0) | 7.4 (45.3) | 10.3 (50.5) | 14.5 (58.1) | 18.6 (65.5) | 21.5 (70.7) | 24.2 (75.6) | 23.6 (74.5) | 20.5 (68.9) | 13.9 (57.0) | 10.3 (50.5) | 7.4 (45.3) | 15.0 (58.9) |
| Mean daily minimum °C (°F) | 1.6 (34.9) | 1.3 (34.3) | 2.0 (35.6) | 6.4 (43.5) | 9.7 (49.5) | 10.4 (50.7) | 12.7 (54.9) | 12.2 (54.0) | 9.9 (49.8) | 5.1 (41.2) | 4.2 (39.6) | 1.8 (35.2) | 6.4 (43.6) |
| Mean minimum °C (°F) | −6.2 (20.8) | −5.4 (22.3) | −2.3 (27.9) | 0.4 (32.7) | 4.2 (39.6) | 6.0 (42.8) | 8.6 (47.5) | 6.7 (44.1) | 2.5 (36.5) | −0.4 (31.3) | −1.4 (29.5) | −5.7 (21.7) | −8.1 (17.4) |
| Record low °C (°F) | −15.2 (4.6) | −15.9 (3.4) | −11.2 (11.8) | −5.6 (21.9) | −2.3 (27.9) | 1.3 (34.3) | 5.3 (41.5) | 2.4 (36.3) | −1.3 (29.7) | −5.3 (22.5) | −7.2 (19.0) | −13.4 (7.9) | −15.9 (3.4) |
| Average precipitation mm (inches) | 77.8 (3.06) | 56.0 (2.20) | 54.8 (2.16) | 52.6 (2.07) | 52.2 (2.06) | 48.5 (1.91) | 50.2 (1.98) | 52.1 (2.05) | 61.8 (2.43) | 87.2 (3.43) | 83.9 (3.30) | 78.5 (3.09) | 755.5 (29.74) |
| Average precipitation days | 12.2 | 9.8 | 10.5 | 9.5 | 9.5 | 8.6 | 8.4 | 8.6 | 8.9 | 11.7 | 11.7 | 11.5 | 120.9 |
Source: Met Office

== Demographics ==
According to the 2011 census, the parish of Medstead had a population of 2,036 people, of which 36.10% were in full-time employment and 13.30% in part-time employment, both slightly below the national average. There are 859 dwellings in the parish with an average size of 2.52 people.

Population growth in the parish of Medstead since 1801

| Year | Population | ±% |
|---|---|---|
| 1801 | 393 | — |
| 1811 | 350 | −10.9% |
| 1821 | 394 | +12.6% |
| 1831 | 418 | +6.1% |

| Year | Population | ±% |
|---|---|---|
| 1841 | 450 | +7.7% |
| 1851 | 482 | +7.1% |
| 1881 | 503 | +4.4% |
| 1891 | 451 | −10.3% |

| Year | Population | ±% |
|---|---|---|
| 1901 | 488 | +8.2% |
| 1911 | 655 | +34.2% |
| 1921 | 776 | +18.5% |
| 1931 | 1,088 | +40.2% |

| Year | Population | ±% |
|---|---|---|
| 1951 | 1,318 | +21.1% |
| 1961 | 1,383 | +4.9% |
| 2001 | 1,881 | +36.0% |
| 2011 | 2,036 | +8.2% |

Source: A Vision of Britain through Time, statistics.gov.uk (2001), and statistics.gov.uk (2011)

The 2011 census reported an almost equal number of males (1016, 49.9%) as females (1020, 50.1%), of which the majority (1988, 97.6%) were white ethnicity, broadly similar to the ethnical diversity of the wider Hampshire region, where 111,635 (96.56%) are registered on the 2011 census as being white ethnicity.

== Education and activities ==
Medstead Church of England Primary School lies immediately south of the village near the cemetery. Under the Education Act 1944, the previous site of Medstead's school was declared inadequate as it did not have enough space to accommodate a playing field and assembly hall. The school was consequently relocated to a larger site south of the village, where it is today. A pre-school has been in operation since September 1989, located in the grounds of the primary school after a successful petition ensured its relocation from the village hall.

The village hall is used for various activities, including hosting the village's gardening and lawn tennis clubs. In addition, Medstead has its own cricket club which has been in operation for over 150 years and a Bowls Club occupying a 40 square metres (430 sq ft) playing field which houses eight rinks. The main village hall was first built in the 1970s and has a capacity of 200 people; 150 people can be accommodated seated around tables or 120 for formal occasions. A separate small hall can accommodate 50 people with en suite kitchen and a separate bar area.

== Governance ==
The village falls under the East Hampshire parliament constituency, represented in the House of Commons by Conservative MP Damian Hinds since 2010. In County Council elections, Hampshire is divided into 75 electoral divisions that return a total of 78 councillors; Medstead, along with Bentworth, is in Alton Rural Electoral Division. In district council elections, East Hampshire is divided into 38 electoral wards that return a total of 44 councillors; Medstead is in Downland Electoral Ward, together with Four Marks.

== Landmarks ==
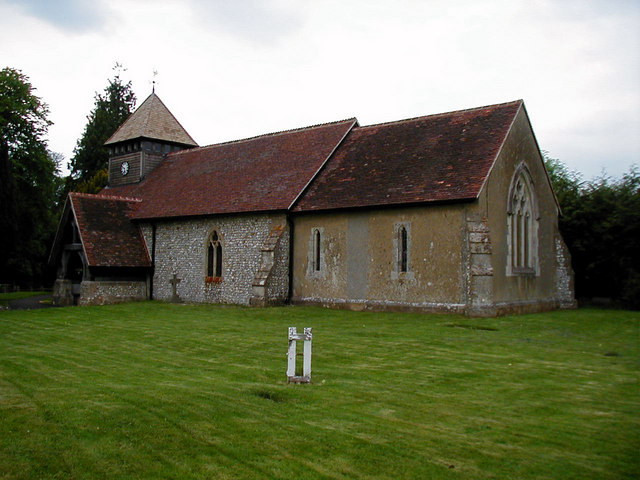
St Andrew's Church from the south side.

A chapel in the village was first mentioned in the Domesday Survey in 1086. The Norman church of St Andrew was first constructed in 1160 after the previous chapel was demolished. The church has flint walls whereas its chancel has cemented walls, along with windows dating from the 14th century. The church was restored in the 19th century, along with a nave extension and the addition of a new chancel arch. The churchyard has a Grade II listed war memorial which is dedicated to fallen soldiers of the First World War. The memorial is made out of Cornish granite and features a Celtic cross with a crusader's sword sculpted in its centre; it was unveiled on 17 October 1920 by Admiral Jervoise and dedicated by the rector of St Andrew's Church.

Medstead contains a total of six Grade II listed buildings. Southdown Old Farmhouse is a small manor which dates from the 18th century and has undergone 20th century restorations and extensions; the manor was designated as a listed building on 31 May 1985. Another Grade II listed building is a Victorian wheelhouse with a donkey wheel which lies immediately southwest of Southdown Old Farmhouse. The wheelhouse was built in the early 19th century and consists of weatherboarded timber frames on brick plinths. The donkey wheel is in working order and is made of a large timber axle with a rope hanging over a well.

== Notable people ==
The musician and composer Laura Jurd grew up in Medstead.
