= Oliver's Battery =

Village and parish in Hampshire, England

Coordinates: 51.0450°N 1.3523°W

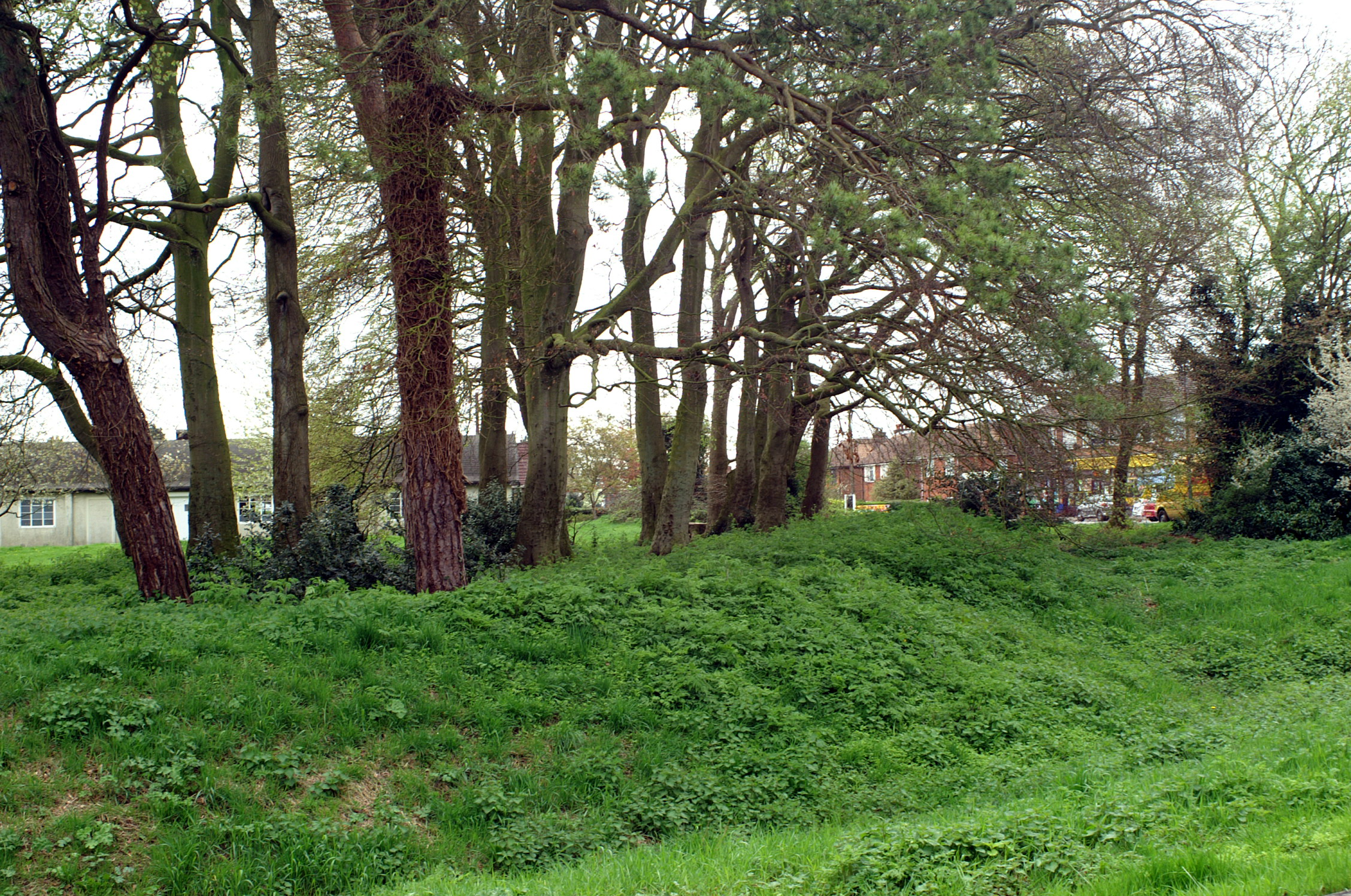
- The earthworks and shops in Oliver's Battery Road South.

- Location within Hampshire
- Population: 1,547 (2011 Census)
- OS grid reference: SU458277
  - London: 62.2m
- District: City of Winchester
- Shire county: Hampshire
- Region: South East
- Country: England
- Sovereign state: United Kingdom
- Post town: Winchester
- Postcode district: SO22
- Dialling code: 01962
- Police: Hampshire and Isle of Wight
- Fire: Hampshire and Isle of Wight
- Ambulance: South Central
- UK Parliament: Winchester

Oliver's Battery is a civil parish in Hampshire, England, of some 700 households located just to the south of the City of Winchester. The parish was formed in 1956 (in the then Winchester Rural District, and part of the City of Winchester District since 1974) from part of Compton parish. The parish does not include the whole of the settlement known informally as Oliver's Battery, with the northern boundary following the A3090 and therefore excluding Oliver's Battery Road North.

== History ==
The name Oliver's Battery refers to a prominent Iron Age earthwork. A fine Anglo-Saxon bowl from a burial within the Battery was on show for many years at the British Museum, but has now been returned to Winchester City Museum on long-term loan. The parish also contains a number of Bronze Age burial mounds. The Olivers Battery name dates back to the English Civil War and is specifically associated with Oliver Cromwell's siege of Winchester in 1645. A map of 1780 refers to the area as "Cromwell's Camp" and later maps show it as "Oliver Cromwell's Battery". The ancient earthwork may well have provided a suitable campsite for the besieging Parliamentarian forces, but cannon of the period would have lacked the range to fire on Winchester Castle and city walls from the so-called battery site.

For centuries, Oliver's Battery was open downland grazed by sheep. Permanent settlements only appeared in the early years of the twentieth century with the establishment of a military camp. During the First World War the army maintained an extensive Veterinary Hospital for horses. After the war, the camp was split up into small holdings with army huts being used as dwellings. Gradually, a community developed as huts were replaced with houses and other homes were built.

In the late 1970s the community was bisected by Badger Farm Road (now the A3090), which acts as a south-western ring road for Winchester. A southern Winchester park-and-ride scheme opened in 2010 and is intended to reduce rush-hour congestion on this road.

== Facilities ==
There is a local shopping centre built in the 1960s, with Sub Post Office. A small Anglican church, St Mark's, doubles up as a village hall and there is also a Catholic church, St Stephen's. Oliver's Battery Primary School was opened in 1973. St Peter's Catholic Primary School was built in the 1980s (having originated in Winchester in the 1850s), next to St Stephen's. The Catholic school and church are in Oliver's Battery Road North, and therefore not within the civil parish. There is no secondary school, but Kings' School is within walking distance.
