= Petersfield Rural District =

Former local government area in the UK

Petersfield Rural District is a former council district that comprised the areas of Petersfield and the parishes that surrounded the town. It now lies within the present-day East Hampshire district in Hampshire, England. East Hampshire Council assumed responsibilities on 1 April 1974 and comprises the areas of this council and the Alton Rural District — it was originally known as the District Council of Petersfield.
