= Oliver's Battery, Tresco =

Artillery battery on Tresco, UK

Oliver's Battery
- Tresco in the Isles of Scilly, Cornwall, England
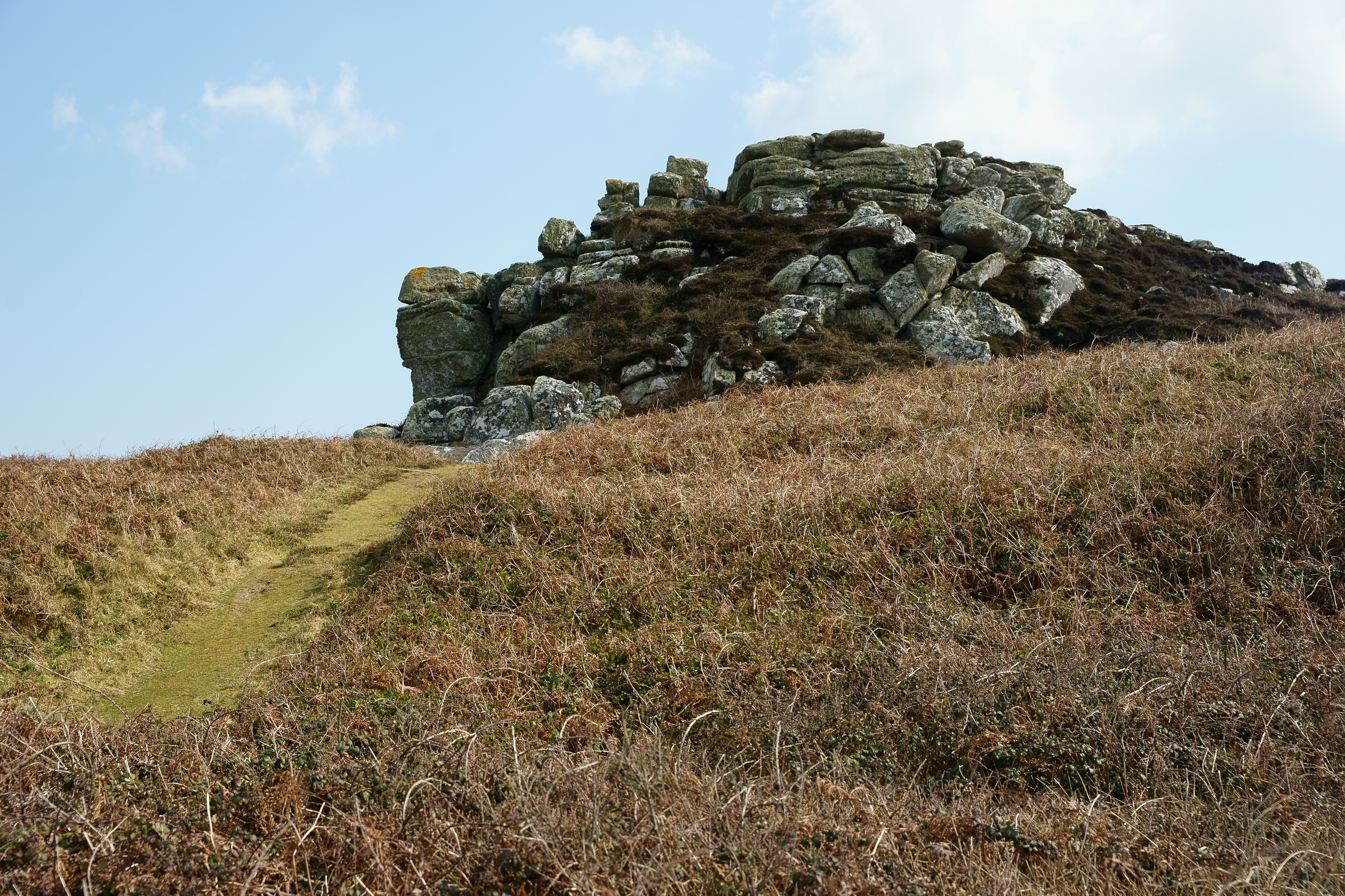
- Exterior of Oliver's Battery

Site information
- Type: Artillery battery
- Owner: Duchy of Cornwall
- Open to the public: Yes
- Condition: Ruined

Location
- Shown within the Isles of Scilly
- Coordinates: 49.9408°N 6.3317°W
- Grid reference: grid reference SV89311351

Site history
- Materials: Earth and rubble
- Events: 1651 invasion of the Scilly Isles

Oliver's Battery is a ruined artillery battery on the island of Tresco in the Isles of Scilly off of Cornwall, England. It was built by the Parliamentarian admiral, Sir Robert Blake, after he invaded Tresco in April 1651 during the years of the interregnum. It was used to bombard the neighbouring island of St Mary's, which was still held by an opposing Royalist army, and forced its surrender several weeks later. The battery comprised a triangle of ramparts, constructed using earth and rubble, which, combined with the natural stone features on the site, produced a substantial, if crude, fortification. It is now ruined, and owned by the Duchy of Cornwall.

== History ==
=== 17th century ===
Oliver's Battery was built in the interregnum following the English Civil War. The Isles of Scilly had supported Charles I during the conflict between 1642 and 1646, and, after a short period in Parliamentary control, the islands rebelled in favour of Charles in 1648. The islands became a base for Royalist privateers, and Parliament became concerned that the Dutch, then hostile to England, might counter the piracy by occupying the islands, gaining a foothold that they could then use against England. In 1651 Parliament sent Sir Robert Blake in charge of a naval task force to retake the islands.

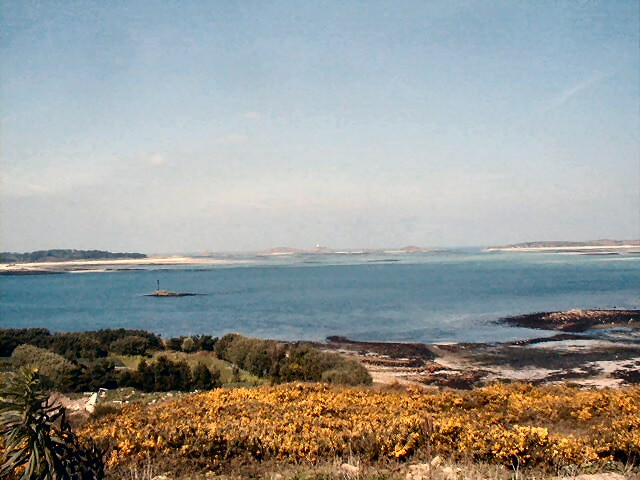
The waters controlled by Oliver's Battery; looking from the northern edge of St Mary's towards St Martin's (right) and Tresco and the battery (left)

Blake arrived in April 1651 and set about invading the island of Tresco. Taking the harbour of Old Grimsby in an amphibious assault on 18 April, he then bypassed the northern fortress of King Charles's Castle and marched south, intending to use Tresco as a base for taking the neighbouring island of St Mary's, approximately 2 kilometres (1.2 mi) away.

When Blake reached Carn Near on the south end of Tresco, he constructed an artillery position for a battery of three guns overlooking the channel between the island and St Mary's, as well as the harbour of St Mary's Pool, hoping to pressure the Royalists into surrender. The work was carried out rapidly between 19 April and 4 May, possibly reusing the site of a Bronze Age burial cairn. (Note: The erosion of the southern edge of the battery revealed various pottery fragments, and these have been assessed by Charles Thomas to have come from an earlier Bronze Age funerary cairn pre-dating the battery on the same site. Historian Mark Bowden, drawing on analysis by the local archaeologist Katherine Sawyer, disputes this interpretation.) When the battery began firing on 4 May, one of the guns exploded causing two deaths, but the bombardment soon recommenced and St Mary's agreed to surrender several weeks later on 23 May.

=== 18th – 21st centuries ===
The antiquarian William Borlase visited the site in 1752, which he thought was a breastwork defence named after the Parliamentary leader Oliver Cromwell. He remarked on how its construction was "irregular and uneven", and suspected that it was very old, pre-dating the civil war. He also noted how its position would have allowed it to protect the location he believed the Parliamentary forces had used as their camp, and commented as to how the winds and tides would have forced Royalist ships entering or leaving St Mary's harbour to sail into close range of its guns.

The blockhouse is owned by the Duchy of Cornwall and it is protected as a scheduled monument under UK law. The site was surveyed in 1990 by the Cornwall Archaeology Unit, and in 2009 by English Heritage.

== Design ==
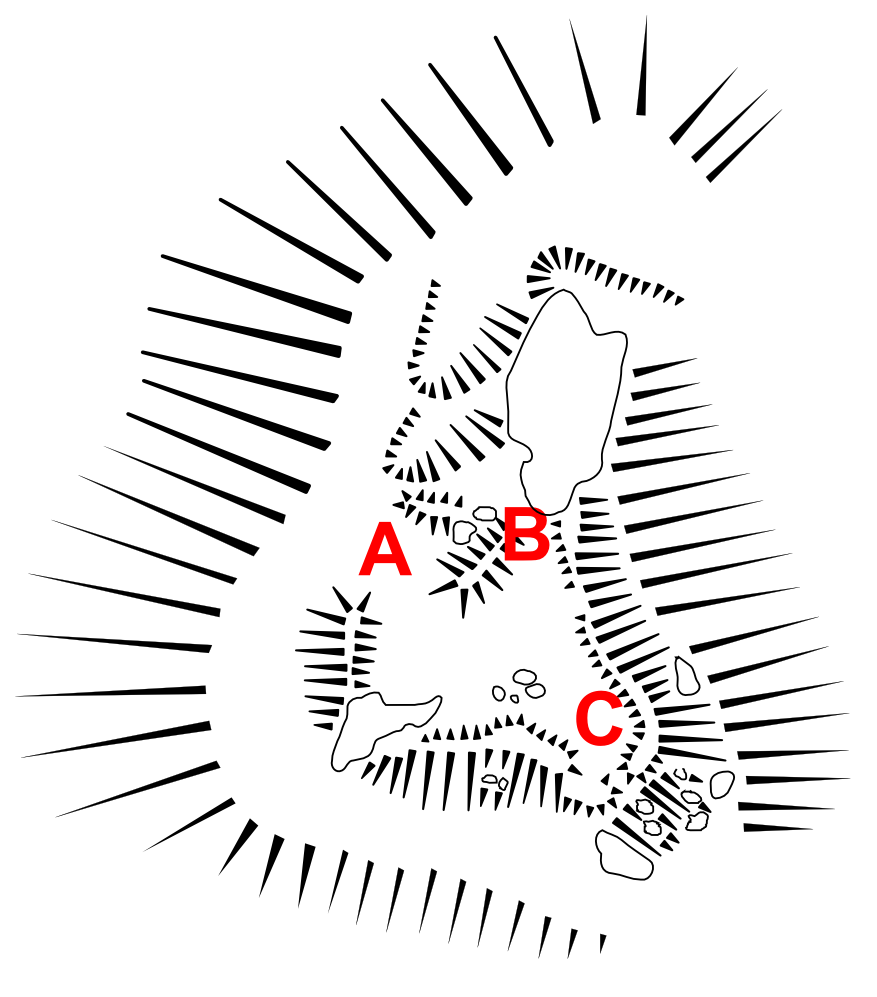
Plan of the battery; A – entrance; B – small building; C – gun platform

Oliver's Battery is on a hill overlooking the island of St Mary's to the south-east. It is triangular in shape, the sides of which are roughly 25 metres by 30 metres by 30 metres (82 ft by 98 ft by 98 ft) in length. The battery was entered from its north-western side, and in the north-east corner there was a small building, approximately 6 metres by 3.5 metres (20 ft by 11 ft), which may have been a store or a temporary gun magazine. The artillery pieces were located in the south-eastern corner of the battery, where a gun platform, 7 metres (23 ft) in diameter, occupied the highest part of the fortification.

The battery is surrounded by an earth and rubble bank, incorporating natural outcrops of stone, between 4.5 metres and 8 metres (15 ft and 26 ft) wide, and 2 metres (6 ft 7 in) high externally. On the west and south sides the ramparts are protected by a ditch, typically 4.5 metres (15 ft) m wide and 0.6 metres (2 ft 0 in) deep. The historian Mark Bowden considers the fortification to be "substantial but relatively crude", probably a result of the speed with which the building work was carried out.

At the bottom of the hill beside the battery are two rectangular earthworks, 16 metres by 8 metres (52 ft and 26 ft), and 26 metres and 12 metres (85 ft and 39 ft). Traditionally these have been thought to be Royalist gun batteries pre-dating the construction of Oliver's Battery, but recent scholarship casts doubt on this, suggesting that they are instead the remains of hollow ways and sand pits.

== Bibliography ==
- Ashbee, Paul (1986). "Ancient Scilly: Retrospect, Aspect and Prospect". Cornish Archaeology. 25: 186–219.
- Borlase, William (1756). Observations on the Ancient and Present State of the Islands of Scilly, and their Importance to the Trade of Great Britain. Oxford, UK: W. Jackson. OCLC 64415301.
- Bowden, Mark (2011). "Military Defences 1540–1951: Earthwork Sites and Minor Features". Research Department Report Series. London, UK: English Heritage. ISSN 1749-8775.
- Bowden, Mark; Brodie, Allan (2011). "Defending Scilly". Research News. 16: 8–11.
- Brodie, Allan (2011). "The Garrison, St Mary's, Isles of Scilly: The Defences of the Garrison 1500–1945, Survey Report". Research Department Report Series. London, UK: English Heritage. ISSN 1749-8775.
- O'Neil, B. H. St John (1961). Ancient Monuments of the Isles of Scilly (2nd ed.). London, UK: Her Majesty's Stationery Office. OCLC 58256.
