= South Town, Hampshire =

Hamlet in Hampshire, England

Coordinates: 51.12948°N 1.06548°W

South Town
- Location within Hampshire
- OS grid reference: SU654371
- Civil parish: Medstead
- District: East Hampshire
- Shire county: Hampshire
- Region: South East
- Country: England
- Sovereign state: United Kingdom
- Post town: ALTON
- Postcode district: GU34
- Police: Hampshire and Isle of Wight
- Fire: Hampshire and Isle of Wight
- Ambulance: South Central
- UK Parliament: East Hampshire

South Town is a hamlet situated in the civil parish of Medstead, Hampshire. Its nearest town is Alton, which lies 4.7 miles (7.6 km) away.

The nearest railway station is the restored Medstead & Four Marks station on the Watercress Line, trains from which connect with the nearest national rail station 5.2 miles (8.4 km) to the northeast, at Alton.
