= Four Marks =

Village and parish in Hampshire, England

Coordinates: 51.111°N 1.044°W

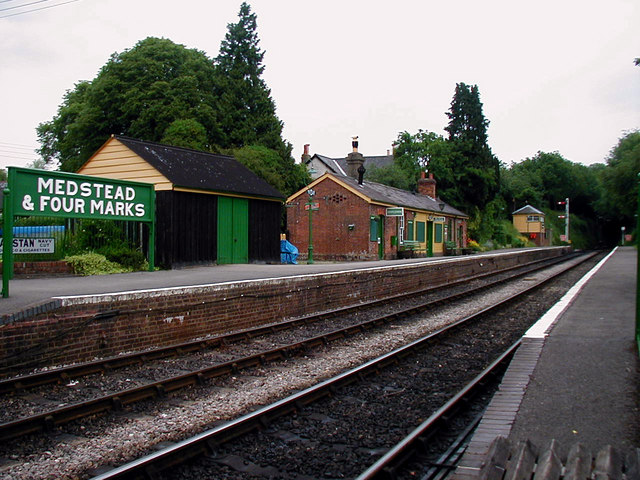
- Medstead & Four Marks Station

- Location within Hampshire
- Population: 4,799
- Demonym: Fourmarkian
- OS grid reference: SU669351
- Civil parish: Four Marks
- District: East Hampshire
- Shire county: Hampshire
- Region: South East
- Country: England
- Sovereign state: United Kingdom
- Post town: ALTON
- Postcode district: GU34
- Dialling code: 01420
- Police: Hampshire and Isle of Wight
- Fire: Hampshire and Isle of Wight
- Ambulance: South Central
- UK Parliament: East Hampshire

Four Marks is a village and civil parish in the East Hampshire district of Hampshire, England. It is 4.4 miles (7.1 km) southwest of Alton, on the A31 road. It is situated on the borders of the South Downs National Park on the Pilgrims' Way that leads from Winchester to Canterbury. It contains within it the medieval hamlets of Kitwood, Hawthorn and Lymington, although now the whole parish is relatively closely settled.

== Etymology ==
First mentioned within the c. 1550 Perambulation of the Manor of Alresford (a Perambulation being a detailed description of the boundaries of land) as 'Fowremarkes' . The relevant excerpt details;

"a certain empty piece of land called Fowremarkes near Bookemere and named thus because four tithings abut there mutually, that is to say, the tithings of Medsted Ropley Faryngdon & Chawton".

The 'Marks' element comes from Old English 'mark(e)' meaning boundary, or border, so, Four Marks directly translates as Four Borders. The borders being those of Medstead, Ropley, Farringdon and Chawton.

== History ==
=== Prehistory ===
In the New Stone Age there seems to be significant evidence of activity and settlement spread about the parish, which includes several Neolithic polished axeheads found near Headmore Farm, and others found near Swelling Hill pond and Brislands Lane. Several arrowheads and other flint tools have been found scattered within the parish too, suggesting not insignificant amounts of settlement. In the Early Bronze Age three barrows were constructed as graves for important members of the local community. These sit just South of Barn Lane. Some additional individual finds from this period have been found by hobby archaeologists near to the parish.

A pre-Roman ridgeway from the Old Sarum area, the Lunway, crosses through Four Marks from the north following the drier southern side of the ridge. It is itself crossed near the old Windmill Inn (now the Co-op store) by a summerway from Alresford and its river, following the quickest, driest, 'up-and-over' route to the River Wey.

Several features and finds dating to the Iron Age have been found in the village over the decades; these show a densely settled and worked landscape. Evidence of settlement was uncovered by pre-construction works near to Brislands Lane. This has been reinforced by finds of pottery, loom weights and coins around Four Marks and neighbouring villages over the years. In the Roman period a road was built from Winchester, then known as Venta Belgarum, to London (Londinium likely crossed through Four Marks), although this theory is not without controversy. The area around Four Marks was very active in this time, with villas and farmsteads, although little is known of within Four Marks except for the occasional coin.

=== Early history ===
The area was given by King Cenwalh of the West Saxons to the bishopric at Winchester, starting a chain of ecclesiastical management through to the current day. The commitment was confirmed in writing by a successor, King Ine, in A.D. 701 in a disputed charter. The charter listed many local gates and watering places, mostly identifiable today, showing that the area contained important Saxon husbandry. In the following centuries Four Marks seems to be quite empty as the soil was not attractive enough for farmsteads and water access was an issue as the village lies on a ridge. It was because of this fact that Four Marks became the site of the commons of various neighbouring parishes, especially Ropley, whose commons expanded over most of the current settlement of the village.

The earliest medieval settlement in Four Marks was Lymington, likely a small farmstead, which stood halfway between the railway bridge and Five Ash Pond on Lymington Bottom Road. This was first recorded in 1307 as Lenynton meaning the farmstead by the lime trees. This settlement disappeared by the 15th century and survives only in the lane name Lymington Bottom Road.

The oldest still inhabited part of the village is the hamlet of Hawthorn, first recorded in 1424 as Horethornes, which sits north of Hawthorn Road. It saw a great deal of activity from as early as the 15th century, and has been continuously settled since the 1500s. Here are also the oldest houses in Four Marks (see below).

As mentioned, Four Marks referred to the meeting point of four parishes. It was, therefore, not a place, but a four-way boundary point known as a quadripoint near the current Boundaries surgery (SU6715635272). It was marked by a large white stone, first recorded in 1759, which was reported destroyed by workmen during road construction in the 1960s. An old photograph notes its site tucked into a roadside hedge.

Apart from the accident of boundaries, 'Four Marks' for almost all its history and most of its modern times was an empty, but busy, place. People passed through, or near by, without great notice using the Roman Road, then later the King's Highway through Chawton Park Wood, and, beginning in the 18th century the Alton to Winchester turnpike (now the A31). The high point of the roads at about 215 metres was a chalk ridge, capped with clay and flints, lying between Telegraph Lane and the centre of Medstead. Rainwater flows to the north to the River Thames and, to the south, to the Solent. Under 50 inhabitants clustered away from the through road around small farms dotted along the old river bed called Lymington Bottom and, for instance, at Hawthorn, Kitfield and Kitwood.

=== Historic buildings ===
By the 18th century Four Marks had grown in size and was home to several farmsteads, many of which still stand today. Despite the listing of some historic buildings, several have gone unlisted. Below is a list of properties built prior to the 1830s:

Name	Date of construction	State
Headmore Farm	1500s	Well preserved & grade II listed
Jayswood Cottage	Circa 1680	Well preserved & grade II listed
Beech farm	1730s	Well preserved
Keepsake cottage	1700s	Well preserved
Kitwood Farm	1700s	Disappeared (not modern Kitwood Farm, which was built in the later 1800s)
Brislands Farm	1700s	Disappeared
Windmill Inn	1790s	Burnt down and rebuilt in 1920s; now the Co-op store and post office
Willis Farm	Early 1800s	Well preserved
Cobb Farm	Early 1800s	Well preserved
Semaphore Farm	1827	Well preserved & grade II listed

=== Modern history ===
The birth of the new village came in the years between 1894 and World War I. At least five major developers, one unidentified, descended on Four Marks intent on social improvement or plain commercial gain. Winchester College Estate conducted at least two major sales: 350 acres in Medstead and Soldridge offered in April 1894 and, in May 1912, around the main road in Four Marks. The Land Company of London held two auctions at Lymington Park Estate in 1896, offering over 140 plots with a hotel and shops on a farm bought from Charles Frederick Hemming. Lymington Park Estate surrounded Lymington Farm, a substantial set of buildings on the corner of Brislands Lane, grandly renamed Lymington Park Road for the auction, and Lymington Bottom, called Medstead Main Road. At almost the same time, William Carter, owner of Herbert Park, offered large opportunities in Alton and Kitwood Lanes. A local man, Frank Gotelee, who in 1901 had acquired much of the land in Medstead which had been accumulated in the 1850s and 60s by William Ivey, tried to sell freehold plots for development, although with less success.

Carter's development was initially called the Homestead Movement. Its defining characteristics were cheap, rural or semirural land suitable for market gardening or self-sufficiency, and the option of a basic house, usually single-storey 'colonial' style bungalows in a 'do-it-yourself' community. 'Colonial' was a trade name with the several standard designs, mostly one, two or three bedrooms with a living room and kitchen costing from £100 upwards. The higher prices also brought tile roofs instead of corrugated iron. Homestead's developments were sold without utilities: no clean water (use of a water tank or a well to be dug), no electricity (generator, solid fuel stoves and fireplaces, kerosene or gas lamps) and no sewerage (outside earth closet toilet).

In the ten years to 1901, the settlement around Four Marks doubled: inhabitants to 279 and dwellings to 67, and by 1911, a further increase to 334 people and 87 homes. Three maps of the sales survive for Winchester College, The Land Company and for Carter's Herbert Park. Together, they contain 242 plots comprising an estimated 251 acres, about half the total acreage enclosed in the 1709 Ropley enclosure and on approximately the same land. The maps also cover almost every nook and cranny of the early Four Marks developments, with the exception of the early bungalows on the southern side of Blackberry Lane; about 23 according to the 1912 map of Winchester College.

Within five years, the population of this small area to the south and east of the London to Winchester road had almost trebled to close to 250 people with over 30 new homes. Many new inhabitants, noted in later censuses, came from 'London': Battersea, Bloomsbury, Bow, Bowes Park, Camberwell, Chiswick, Ealing, Holborn, Hornsey, Islington, Kilburn, Kingston-upon-Thames, Leyton, Old Bailey, Paddington, St Pancras, Stamford Hill, Tooting, Tottenham, Tower Hamlets, Walworth, Westminster and Windsor.

The modern village of Four Marks was founded at the end of the nineteenth century on little developed old commons and wastes mostly left from the 1709 Ropley enclosure. Four Marks became a parish in 1932 under Alton Rural District Council when parts of six parishes were annexed: Chawton (1%), East Tisted (2%), Farringdon (17%), Medstead (4%), Newton Valence (13%) and Ropley (64%). According to Bartholomew's Gazetteer, the village of Four Marks is the only so named place in the United Kingdom.

A separate development, which began slowly shortly after the turn of the century, was an entirely different example of social change. The invention of two new popular forms of transport, bicycles and motor vehicles, transformed Winchester Road along its length. This single-carriageway was eventually dotted with flowering cherry and ornamental apple trees. In a steady growth from between the wars and into the 1950s, businesses catered for a 'mobile, fine evening and weekend pleasure pursuing population' heading for the country. Premises 'sprouted like mushrooms' providing fuel and mechanical assistance for motorists and cyclists and, with the townies who came by railway, for sustenance with general stores, road houses, wholesome refreshment rooms, small shops, cafés, the Windmill Inn, and even The Blinking Owl, a good class restaurant with a dance floor. Those smaller shops, which might otherwise have spread around the side streets with the bungalows, instead congregated prominently on Winchester Road taking best advantage of the needs of both visitors and locals. Many of the shops were made of rickety ex-Canadian Army huts.

In its current and ongoing phase from 1961, the population of Four Marks more than tripled in the next 50 years, the number of dwellings quadrupling. There were 3,893 inhabitants in 2011. There has been an explosion in piecemeal and large estate development in the last ten years.

=== Crimean myth ===
Claims have been made based on a local history that Four Marks was initially settled by returning soldiers of the Crimean War, 1853–56. The idea that a grateful government would give out land it did not own for a tiny selection of ordinary veterans uniquely in Four Marks is dubious. No supporting evidence has been found in government papers or in histories of the Crimean War. In the ten years to 1871, the population in Four Marks increased unremarkably to 139. If the small increase had been the result of the war, it would have happened before 1861 and not ten years later. A close examination of the occupants in 1861 shows no war-weary from Sevastopol, but a less exciting handful of fertile local families who worked the land on scattered existing farms: leaseholders, agricultural labourers, carters and a shepherd. The attractive Crimean story is a myth.

== Local amenities and points of interest ==
Four Marks has a large recreation ground including football, cricket, tennis courts, local bowls club and BMX ramps. The village centre has been recently refurbished, and includes a restful area surrounded by flowerbeds under the village clock. The local amenities include a chemist, a bakers with cafe, a fish and chip shop, a Chinese takeaway, an Indian restaurant, an off licence, a fine wine shop, both female and male hairdressers, Tesco and Co-op outlets, a filling station and limited free parking. The Co-op also houses the post office. There are two residential homes, a doctor's surgery, a veterinary surgery and a golf course.

=== Four Marks School ===
Prior to being made its own parish, the growing population of the then-hamlet of Four Marks required its own school. This was compounded by the fact that the main village school on Church Street in Ropley was far away from Four Marks.

The school was largely a gift of two benefactors. Marianna Hagen of Ropley was the driving force; she bought the plot of land, part of Homestead Farm on Hawthorn Road in 1902 from John Joseph Tomlinson, a London-based wholesale stationer. Tomlinson, in turn, gave the purchase price towards the cost of construction. At first, church services were held in the school until in 1908, when Hagen moved the 'Iron Room', a corrugated iron and timber hut, from Ropley Soke to opposite Belford House where it became the mission. This chapel is still visible now and lies in a dilapidated state.

Since construction the school has been expanded, including a large block built to the southeast of the old school building in the 1970s. It is a Church of England school, and bears the highest possible rank of "Outstanding" by OFSTED.

=== Village hall ===
The first village hall was built around 1910, intended as a social and multi-purpose institute was formed which met in borrowed premises. A permanent building arrived in 1913 and this has since been incorporated into today's Village Hall in Lymington Bottom.

=== Watercress Line ===
The village has its own restored railway station on the Watercress Line, services from which connect with the nearest national rail station 4.4 miles (7.1 km) to the northeast, at Alton. As a heritage railway, it does not run commuter services. Steam locomotives, restored and operated by the Watercress Line, run regular services between Alton and Alresford (Hampshire), stopping at Medstead and Four Marks and Ropley railway stations. The line was opened in 1865, joining Alton to Winchester.

The railway company twice investigated tunnels to cut through the Four Marks ridge, but these plans were discarded because of cost. The solution was to cut a great gouge through the top of the hill at the bridge in Boyneswood Road.

Medstead station was opened in 1868, with its name changing in 1937 to Medstead and Four Marks. The line provided an alternative route between London and Southampton. Besides transporting locally produced watercress, it was particularly important for military traffic between the Army town of Aldershot and the military embarkation port at Southampton.

The line was axed in 1973 and bought by a local preservation society two years later.

=== Observatory ===
Blackberry Lane was host to an important twin-dome observatory built in 1913 by James Worthington, precocious, wealthy, and the epitome of a new style of aggressive amateur astronomer. Worthington agreed with Percival Lovell, the owner of the now revered Lowell Observatory in Flagstaff, Arizona, that there were canals on Mars built by intelligent beings. The observatory was sold in 1919 when the theory was disproved to great embarrassment, and was pulled down about 1939. The circular ground works of the buildings can be found in the back garden of the original home now called 'Observatory'.

=== Semaphore ===
Telegraph Farm in Telegraph Lane was once part of an unfinished chain of semaphore telegraph stations intended to link the Admiralty in London to Plymouth to combat the threat of a French invasion in the wake of the Napoleonic Wars. It was built in 1826 between River Hill House in Binsted and Merryfield in West Tisted. The semaphore was never used in anger and the station was made redundant in 1847. The semaphore technology was eventually replaced by a telegraph wire along the track of the railway from Alton to Alresford. Its name comes from the fact that the semaphore technology was also known as telegraph at the time.

=== Mildred Bruce ===
The Honourable Mrs Mildred Bruce was a British racing motorist and aviator, the first woman to fly around the world solo over land. Bruce used to land her wooden, single-seat aerobatic biplane, the only Miles Satyr ever built, in the field across the road from her home at Pooks Hill in Alton Lane. She was visited here, at least once, by Amy Johnson, the first woman to fly solo to Australia. Johnson and other aviator visitors all landed in the same field.

=== Triple fff ===
Four Marks is the home of a small brewery with its own bar, Triple fff Brewery, whose beer can be found in pubs in the region.

== Notable people ==
- Mildred Bruce, aviator, lived in Four Marks on Alton Lane
- C. V. Durell, mathematician, lived in Four Marks
- Denis Rolleston Gwynn, political journalist and historian
- Jessie Louisa Rickard, author, lived in Four Marks
- Jane Devonshire, British Chef and 2016 winner of MasterChef.

== Literary associations ==
A surprising number of authors wrote in Four Marks. Here is a current list of books known to have been written in the village:

- David Cornick, Early Memories of Four Marks
- C. V. Durell, world best selling author of books on mathematics including School Certificate Algebra (1958)
- Chris Heal, Sound of Hunger (2018), Disappearing (2019), Reappearing (2020), The Four Marks Murders (2020), Ropley's Legacy (2021), The Winchester Tales (2022), Bad Moon Rising (2023), The War of the Raven (2023), Saints & Sinners (2023), La dernière patrouille de l'UC 61 (2023), Glimpses of the Famous (2025), eating wildly (2025), Lion Man (2026), Tall Stories (2026), The Man with no Shadow (2027)
- Jessie Louisa Rickard, Murder by Night (1939), among some 40 light comedy and detective novels
- W. C. H. Hudson, Myself When Young, Memoirs of a Tea Planter (2001)
- Betty Mills, Four Marks, its Life and Origins (1995)
- Denis Rolleston Gwynn, The Vatican and the War in Europe (1940), among dozens of books on Irish political figures
- John De Walton, illustrator of many books, such as children's author Percy F. Westerman's The Flying Submarine (1912)
- Gerald Wyeth, Four Marks School Boy's Memories

== Media ==
The village has a volunteer-produced monthly magazine, the Four Marks News which has been active since 1973.

The local newspapers are the Alton Herald and the Hampshire Chronicle. Both are published weekly. The Herald regularly features articles about Four Marks.

The Breeze is the local Radio station on 101.6FM with a transmitter based in Four Marks. The service is relayed from the Southampton area.

BBC South is the local BBC service, and ITV Meridian is the local ITV service. The BBC Local Radio service for the area is BBC Solent. All services are broadcast from the Southampton area.
