= Kingsclere and Whitchurch Rural District =

Former local government area in the UK

Coordinates: 51.32330°N 1.24889°W

Kingsclere and Whitchurch
- Rural district
- Area
  - 1951: 77,394 acres (313.2 km^{2})
- Population
  - 1939: 17,791
  - 1971: 27,545
- History
  - Created: 1 April 1932
  - Abolished: 31 March 1974
  - Succeeded by: Basingstoke and Deane
- Status: Rural district
  - HQ: Kingsclere
- Contained within
  - County: Hampshire

Kingsclere and Whitchurch Rural District was a rural district between 1932 and 1974 in Hampshire, England.

The district was formed as a merger of the abolished Kingsclere Rural District, centred on Kingsclere, and Whitchurch Rural District, centred on Whitchurch.

Kingsclere and Whitchurch Rural District was in turn abolished in 1974, with its area becoming part of Basingstoke District, which was renamed Basingstoke and Deane in 1978.

== Premises ==
The council had its offices in a converted and extended early eighteenth century house at 24 Swan Street in Kingsclere.

== Parishes ==
The district contained the following civil parishes:

- Ashmansworth
- Baughurst
- Burghclere
- East Woodhay
- Ecchinswell and Sydmonton
- Highclere
- Hurstbourne Priors
- Kingsclere
- Laverstoke
- Litchfield and Woodcott
- Newtown
- Overton
- St Mary Bourne
- Tadley
- Whitchurch

== Character ==
The northern part of the district was within the North Wessex Downs, which was designated as an Area of Outstanding Natural Beauty shortly before the council's abolition. The district included Highclere Castle.
