= Litchfield and Woodcott =

Civil parish in Hampshire, England

Coordinates: 51.28921°N 1.35536°W

Litchfield and Woodcott is a civil parish in the English county of Hampshire.

Forming part of the district of Basingstoke and Deane the main settlements in the parish are Litchfield, Dunley, Upper Woodcott and Lower Woodcott. At the time of the 2011 Census the population of the civil parish was 137.
