= Winchester Rural District =

Local government district in Hampshire, England (1894–1974)

Winchester Rural District was an administrative district of Hampshire, England that existed from 1894 until 1974. In the middle of the county, the rural district was made up of the area around the city of Winchester. As of 1971, it bordered a number of other Hampshire rural districts, as well as Eastleigh municipal borough, Southampton county borough and Fareham urban district.

Local government affairs in the Winchester Rural District were administered by Winchester Rural District Council and Hampshire County Council.

The district was abolished in 1974 when it was split between Winchester City Council and Eastleigh Borough Council.
