= Ropley =

Village and parish in Hampshire, England

Coordinates: 51.08305°N 1.07855°W

- Village
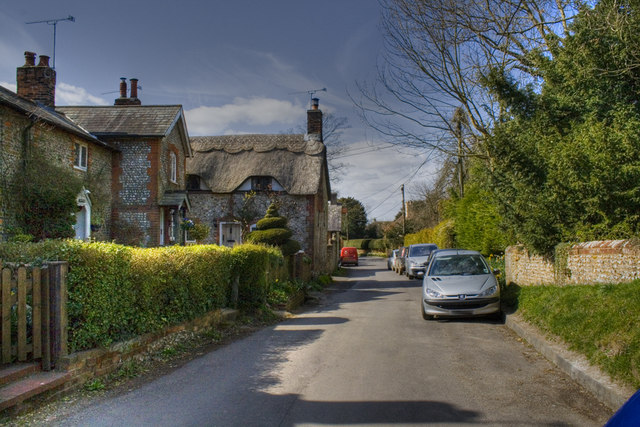
- View down Church Street

- Location within Hampshire
- Population: 1,526; 1,602 (2011 Census)
- OS grid reference: SU646319
- Civil parish: Ropley
- District: East Hampshire
- Shire county: Hampshire
- Region: South East
- Country: England
- Sovereign state: United Kingdom
- Post town: ALRESFORD
- Postcode district: SO24
- Dialling code: 01962
- Police: Hampshire and Isle of Wight
- Fire: Hampshire and Isle of Wight
- Ambulance: South Central
- UK Parliament: East Hampshire

Ropley is a village and large civil parish in the East Hampshire district of Hampshire, England. It has an acreage of 4,684 acres (1,896 ha), situated 4 miles (6.4 km) east of New Alresford. It is served by a station on the Mid Hants Railway heritage line at Ropley Dean, just over 1 mile (1.6 km) from the village shops. It is 6.7 miles (10.8 km) southwest of Alton, just off the A31 road. It lies within the diocese of Winchester.

The St Swithun's Way, part of the Pilgrims' Way from Winchester to Canterbury, passes through the village.

It is distinguished by its general absence of pavements in favour of boundary walls, hedges and mature trees. Ropley holds an annual Boxing Day walk, and a pram race on the spring bank holiday in May.

== Etymology ==
Ropley is first recorded in AD 1167 as Ropeleia. The name is derived from the Old English personal name Hroppa, cognate to modern day Robert, and the common suffix léah which means meadow, small woodland or woodland clearing. The latter meaning is most likely, hence Ropley is translatable as 'Robert's woodland clearing' which would have been known to Anglo-Saxon locals as Hroppanleah.

Ropley's etymology is also related to that of the hamlet of Lyeway about 2.25 km away. Lyeway is first recorded in 1327 in the personal name John atte Ligheweye. The name refers to a way or lane that led to the léah; in other words, Lyeway translates as the 'lane to Ropley'.

== History ==
=== Prehistory ===
Ropley has seen human activity and presence since the Lower Palaeolithic evidenced by a number of handaxes collected in the parish over the last few decades. Later Stone Age evidence from the Mesolithic and Neolithic is also very numerous and particularly evidence from the Neolithic suggest occupation and possibly even flint extraction in the vicinity.

Evidence of Bronze Age activity in the village is significant. Barrows dating to the Early Bronze Age number about five in the parish. A Middle Bronze Age gold torc, found in the village in 1843 suggests activity of local significance and is now in the Royal Cornwall Museum in Torquay although a replica can be found in the local Curtis Museum in Alton. In addition, an impressive imported stone axe (likely from Nuneaton dating to the transition of the Early and Middle Bronze Age further suggests the Bronze Age population in the area were well connected.

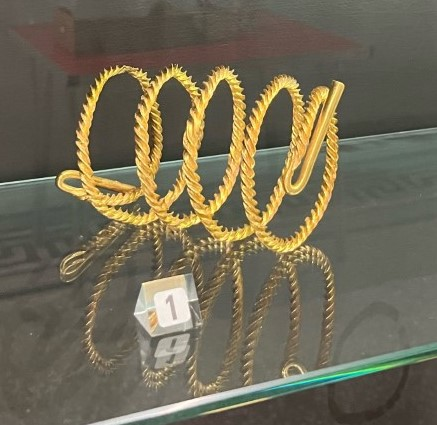
The Ropley gold torc, now in the Royal Cornwall Museum

Iron Age evidence is numerous in the village and its surroundings. Several banjo enclosure crop marks and smaller enclosures can be seen throughout the parish on satellite imagery. Additionally artefacts such as brooches, coins and pottery have been found in significant quantities.

During the Roman occupation the village saw its fair share of activity. It is possible that several roman roads passed through the village the largest of which was one of the main thoroughfares that connected London with Winchester. Settlement in Ropley at this time consisted of farmsteads and smaller settlements situated on, or near the sites of older Iron Age settlements, however no evidence of villas have been found within the parish.

=== The Middle Ages ===
In the Domesday Book of 1086, Ropley was part of the "Hundred of Bishops Sutton" (or "Ashley") and as a result part of Bishops Sutton's or Sudtone entry. Ropley is supposed to have provided the honey for William the Conqueror's mead, although there is no evidence for this, and is likely a myth of later creation.

Ropley was a comparatively large settlement for the area and by the 14th century has outgrown the population of Bishop's Sutton. This is mostly due to the large number of remote hamlets that the parish boundaries of Ropley encompassed such as North Street, South Street and Charlwood. By the 15th century there was a dramatic local shift away from arable to pasture farming, particularly of sheep, whose wool was widely traded from Alresford onwards.

==== The Gervais family ====
By the 13th century much of the manor of Ropley was owned by the Gervase family (also written as Gervais, Gervas, Gervase, Gerveis and Jervays). The name is of French/Norman origin and likely related to the other families who held lands throughout the country, such as that of Walter Gervais. In the 1370s the family began to gift lands in Ropley to the founding of Winchester College by William of Wykeham. William Gervas of Ropley, mentioned in Winchester College documents in 1256, is the first recorded member of the Gervais family in Ropley, although their presence in the village possibly went back earlier. The last known mention of the family in regard to the rentals of the land of Roger Gervays was in 1450. At this point the family had sold most of their lands to Winchester College.

=== Post Medieval ===
==== Inclosure act ====
Ropley Inclosure Act 1709
- Act of Parliament
- Parliament of Great Britain
- Long title: An Act for the enclosing of Ropley Commons, in the County of Southampton; and for Improvement of the old disparked Park of Farnham, in the Counties of Surrey and Southampton.
- Citation: 8 Ann. c. 16 Pr. (Note: This is the citation in The Statutes of the Realm.); 8 Ann. c. 20 Pr. (Note: This is the citation in The Statutes at Large.)
- Territorial extent: Great Britain

Dates
- Royal assent: 5 April 1710
- Commencement: 15 November 1709 (Note: Start of session.)

Status: Current legislation

The commons and common fields of Ropley, estimated at 500 acres, were enclosed by the Ropley Inclosure Act 1709 (8 Ann. c. 16 Pr.) in what was the first private act of Parliament of its kind in England. The bill was led by the Bishop of Winchester, Jonathan Trelawny, in an effort to restore his family finances, and by the College of Winchester. The enclosure was strongly contested by petition by many of the commoners, who claimed that the bishop and his three appointed commissioners were stealing their commons rights. Parliament declined to intervene. Serious and bloody repercussions followed affecting neighbouring parishes and later enclosures across the country.

=== Historic buildings ===
There are numerous old buildings in the village:

Name	Grade	Century of oldest part
St Peter's Church of England Church	Grade II	11th or 12th
The Forge	Grade II	15th with later extended Flemish bond red brick walls.
Smugglers	Grade unknown	15th with successive alterations and renovations through each century
Soame's Farm	Grade unknown	15th
The Old Farmhouse	Grade unknown	16th
The Old Manor House	Grade II	16th with later
Town Street Farmhouse	Grade II	16th
Dover Cottage	Grade II	16th
Ropley House	Grade II*	16th additions in 18th
Charlwood House	Unlisted	17th shown on a map of 1635
Fordes	Grade II	17th
Cromwell Cottage	Grade II	17th
Laurel And Pondside Cottages	Grade II	17th
Ropelia Cottage	Grade II	17th
Gardeners Cottage	Grade II	17th
Fieldview	Grade II	17th
Fairways	Grade II	17th
Sparrow Thatch	Grade II	17th
The Old Farm House	Grade II	17th
The Old Parsonage	Grade II	17th
The Post House	Grade II	18th
Bounty House	Grade II	18th
North Street Farmhouse	Grade II	18th (1730)
Exeter House	Grade II	18th
Archbishop's Cottage	Grade II	18th
Hall Place	Grade II	18th (1790)
Ropley Grove	Grade II	18th Flemish bond red brick walls
Carpenters	Grade II	18th
Little Barton	Grade II	18th
Stables 10 metres east of Hall Place	Grade II	18th
Yew Tree Cottage	Grade II	18th
Ropley Lodge	Grade II	18th
Old Down Cottage	Grade unknown	18th
Ropley Manor	Grade II	early 19th
Stable Block 20 metres south-east of the Post House	Grade II	early 19th

== St Peter's Parish Church ==
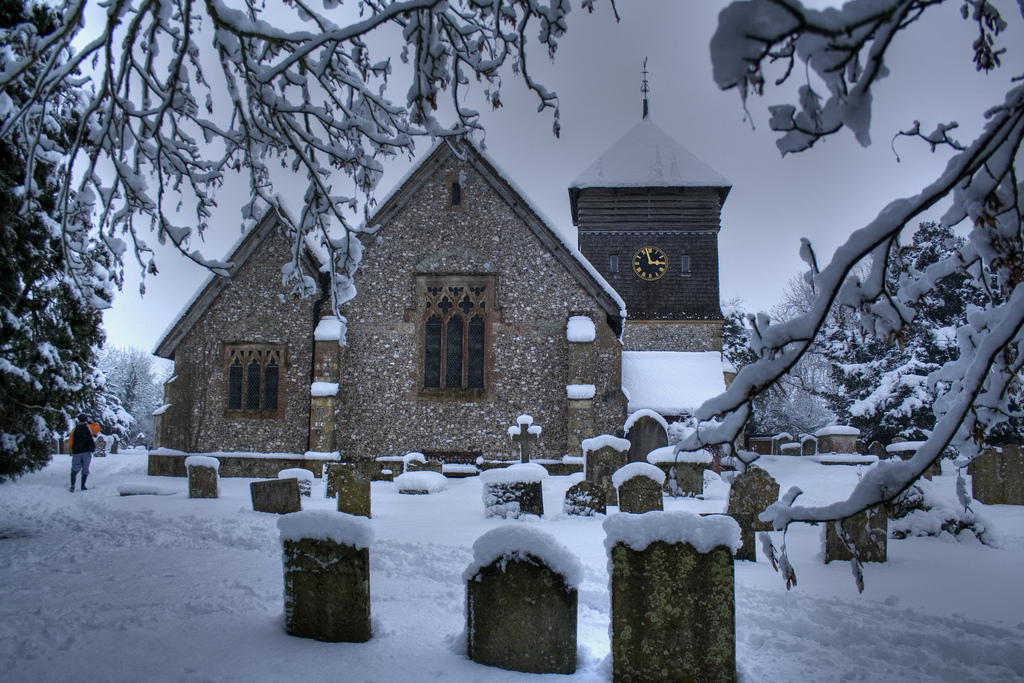
St Peter's Church in the snow

St Peter's Parish Church is one of the most ancient churches in the area, with the oldest parts dating to the 1000s. The church also bears some architectural similarities to St Peter's ad Vincula in nearby Colemore, now redundant, albeit larger. Throughout the medieval period the church saw several modifications, including extension and addition of a south chapel in the late 1200s.

The church here was considered a chapel until Ropley became a separate parish from Bishop's Sutton. Hence, in one of the first records mentioning from around 1270, the church in Ropley is known as the "Cappella de Roppele", meaning the chapel of Ropley in Latin.

In the Victoria County History entry for Ropley the bell inscriptions of Ropley's bells are preserved:

"There are five bells, the ring having been recast from four old bells into five by Samuel Knight in 1701. The tenor bears the inscription:

John Gilberd did contrive to cast from four this peale of fife (five).

John Gilberd was evidently the foreman in charge of the work. The fourth bell was recast by Robert Catlin in 1749, and the third is now cracked. The bell frame was made new at the general recasting, and is inscribed IG TO 1701".

Interestingly, through works and excavations done within the church itself, "workmen found in the South Transept the remains of a furnace and pieces of old bell metal", suggesting the bells were recast directly in the church.

The vicar of Ropley from 1796 to 1811 was the Reverend William Howley (who succeeded his father, also William Howley, in the post). Howley is perhaps Ropley's most famous resident, and went on to serve as a canon of Christ Church, Regius Professor of Divinity at Oxford University, Bishop of London (1813–1828), and Archbishop of Canterbury (1828–1848), in which capacity he crowned two British monarchs.

By the late 1800s the church "had fallen into such a state of dilapidation as to be actually insecure", leading to a restoration that was decided upon in 1891. However, planning did not begin until 1892, due to the appointment and settling-in of the new vicar, Rev. W. H. Leak. The new reverend was able to collect around £2,300 by 1896, about £244,000 in today's money, which was spent primarily on repairing the roof, re-paving the floor with pine blocks and concrete, and removing the old gallery.

Its World War I memorial lists 40 people who died, whilst the World War II tablet lists a further 10 people.

On the morning of 19 June 2014 the Grade-II listed church was severely damaged by a major electrical fire. This gutted the building and destroyed the roof. However, plans were put forward to repair the building, and after eight years, on 26 August 2022, the church was reopened to the public.

== Hamlets ==
Ropley contains many interesting and ancient hamlets that were part or currently are part of the historical area of Ropley Parish:

Ropley hamlets
Hamlet name	First mention	Year mentioned
Charlwood	Cherlewde	1218
Gilbert Street	Robertus f. Gilbertus	1203
Harcombe	Henrico de Havercompe	1208
Hawthorn	Horethornes	1427
Four Marks	Fowremarkes	around 1550
Kitwood	Kyteswode	1403
Lyeway	Ligheweye	1327
North Street	North st.	1347
Ropley Dean	l'Dene	1410
Ropley Soke	Hamerdene (an ancient name for the same region)	AD 701
Stapley	Stapol Wege	AD 932
Swelling Hill	Sweolynge	1403

== Amenities ==
=== Education ===
The village contains one primary school, Ropley CofE Primary School, founded in 1826 by the Reverend Samuel Maddock, who first built it on a previous site in Petersfield Road. William Faichen was the co-founder of the school, and became the first headmaster.

In 1869, the school burned down in a fire. It was rebuilt on the present day site at Church Street and reopened the same year. Since then, the school has operated continuously.

By the early 1900s it became clear that the population growth in Four Marks, then a hamlet within Ropley Parish, made necessary the construction of a new school there. Financed by Marianne Hagen, daughter of the wealthy politician Jacob Hagen, the Ropley School was opened in 1902. "RS 1902" can still be seen on the front of the main school building (see Four Marks School).

The school values its historic links with the community. Parts of the original Victorian traditional flint and brick buildings remain, and now form the hall and the school kitchen. The main teaching area consists of six modern classrooms with shared corridor working spaces. The most recent classroom was built in 2001 and is especially equipped for early years children.

The primary school is one of the feeder schools for Perins School, and both maintain high standards.

=== Station ===
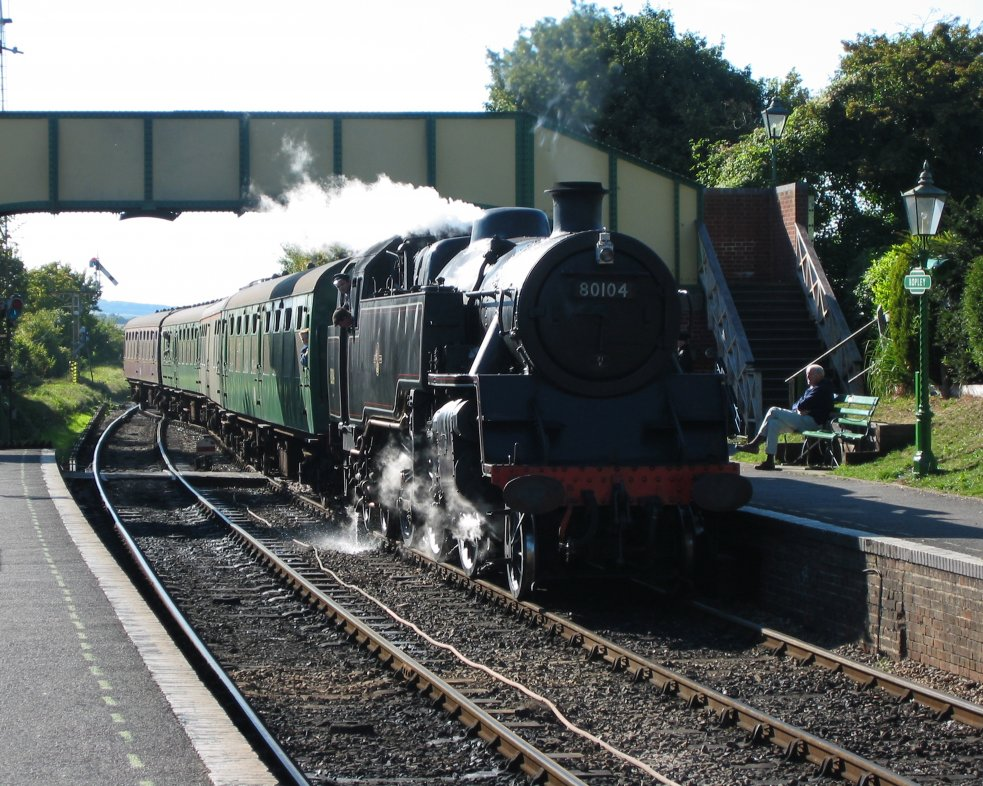
Ropley railway station

Ropley railway station opened in 1865, and has operated continuously since that date, other than for four years from 1973 to 1977. Originally opened by the London and South Western Railway, services ended in 1973, but were restored by a preservation society four years later, as part of the Mid Hants Railway, running heritage services between Alton and New Alresford. There is a 100-year established garden topiary by the station house side. The locomotive shed and engineering works are located adjacent to the station, and tours may be booked. Trains operate from May to September each year, with additional Christmas and New Year special services.

=== Ropley History Network and Archive ===
Since 2021 a local history group known as the Ropley History Network and Archive, abbreviated as RHN&A has been active in the village and its surrounding. The research group primarily focusses on the history and archaeology of the Ropley, in addition to some neighbouring parishes, like Four Marks, West Tisted and Farringdon. Their website, Ropley History hosts a large number of documents, maps, photographs and videos, the group also regularly hold talks and open sessions where artefacts and documents are digitised, discussed and presented.

=== Village Shop ===
The village has a small shop, formerly stables dating to the 19th century. It also doubles as a post office which replaced the older one which was opened in 1851 when the population was 818. In 1870, the population was 796.

== Governance ==
Ropley is part of the Alton Rural county ward, and returns one county councillor to Hampshire County Council.

Election	Member	Ward
2009	Mark Kemp-Gee	Alton Rural
2013	Mark Kemp-Gee	Alton Rural
2017	Mark Kemp-Gee	Alton Rural

Ropley is part of the Ropley and Tisted district ward, and returns one district councillor to East Hampshire District Council.

Election	Member	Ward
2015	Charles Louisson	Ropley and Tisted

== Notable people ==
- Peter Eade (1919–1979), theatrical agent lived in Ropley Grove until his death.
- Samuel Rawson Gardiner (1829–1902), English historian, born in Ropley.
- Jacob Hagen (1809–1870), English-born Australian businessman and politician; owned Ropley House and died in Ropley.
- Marianne Hagen (1852–1932), author and local philanthropist who funded the construction of several local public buildings, lived and died in Ropley
- Richard Holmes CBE, TD, JP, VR (1946–2011), British military historian, lived and died in Ropley.
- William Howley (1766–1848), clergyman in the Church of England, Archbishop of Canterbury 1828–1848 born and grew up in Ropley.
- Thomas Taylor (1753–1806), cricketer who played for the Hambledon Club, made 105 first-class appearances 1775–1798, born and lived in Ropley.
- Brian Timms (born 1940), former English first-class cricketer who played 232 matches, born and lived in Ropley.
- Thomas Edward Woodhouse (1830–1891), co-founder of the Hampshire Field Club & Archaeological Society, Vicar of Ropley from 1871 to 1891 where he lived and died.
