= Beech, Hampshire =

Village and parish in Hampshire, England

Coordinates: 51.14426°N 1.00950°W

Beech
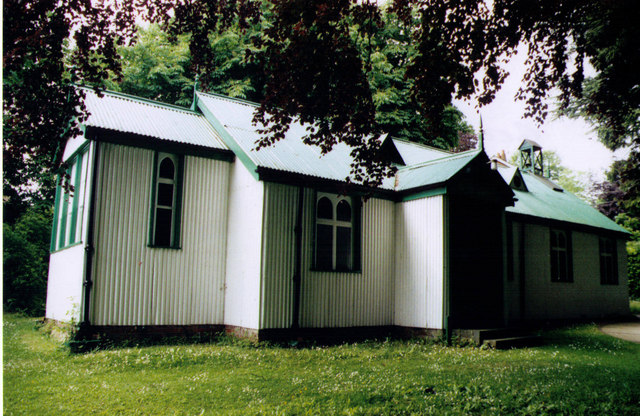
- St Peter's Church, Beech

- Location within Hampshire
- Population: 535; 532 (2011 Census)
- OS grid reference: SU693388
- Civil parish: Beech
- District: East Hampshire
- Shire county: Hampshire
- Region: South East
- Country: England
- Sovereign state: United Kingdom
- Post town: Alton
- Postcode district: GU34
- Dialling code: 01420
- Police: Hampshire and Isle of Wight
- Fire: Hampshire and Isle of Wight
- Ambulance: South Central
- UK Parliament: East Hampshire

Beech is a village and civil parish in the East Hampshire district of Hampshire, England. It lies 2 miles (3 km) west of Alton, just west of the A339 road.

The road between Bentworth and Beech runs over King's Hill (218 m), one of the county's high points. The nearest railway station is 2 miles (3 km) east of the village, at Alton.

== History ==
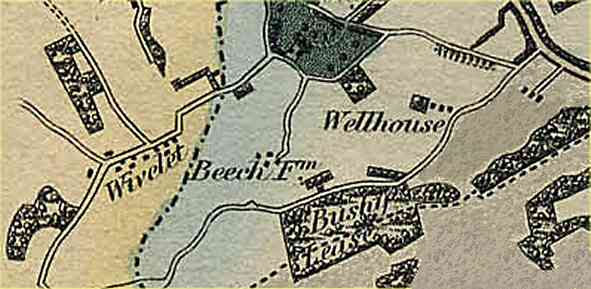
1826 map showing Beech Farm

One of the first examples of the village name Beech is in Greenwood's map of Hampshire dated 1826, which shows a "Beech Farm" between "Wivelet" (the current Wivelrod) to the west, and "Wellhouse" to the east, now Wellhouse lane in the current Civil Parish of Beech.

Modern Beech started to take shape in the 1890s when the landowner began to sell off parcels of land for housing - much of it in the low-cost "colonial" style of wood and corrugated iron construction. This process accelerated after the First World War inspired by Lloyd George's "Homes for Heroes" programme.

The small church building on Wellhouse Road dates from 1902 and the village hall at the east end of Wellhouse lane was established 1932 in a building that was previously part of a print works.

At the west end of Wellhouse Road there was a well from which water was pumped by a large wooden wheel inside which was a track operated by a donkey or pony. This was still there in 2024.

Since the 1960s the original colonial-style housing has generally been replaced by modern detached houses of high value.

Beech used to be part of the parish of Bentworth until boundaries were changed in the 19th century. Today, the Beech Civil Parish (CP) is next to the Bentworth CP to the north and the Medstead CP to the west.

=== Present day ===
The village is now an affluent residential area with little commercial activity within the village boundary. The 2015 electoral roll for Beech lists 457 people living in 217 different addresses.

By year 2000 the Village Hall, although well used, was in need of modernisation. Thanks to the generosity of local inhabitants in an appeal for funding, supported by the National Lottery, a programme of expansion and refurbishment began in 2008. In 2010 the new Village Hall was officially opened by broadcaster, writer and gardening expert Alan Titchmarsh, a former resident of the village.

== Geography ==
The Parish of Beech is located in the north-eastern area of Hampshire approximately 11 miles (18 km) south of Basingstoke, 15 miles (24 km) east of Winchester and two miles (3 km) from the market town of Alton. Beech is close to, but outside, the northern boundary of the South Downs National Park.

The village has a linear nature, sitting largely within a narrow valley that descends (by minor road) for almost two miles (3 km) from Alton Abbey, which at 217 metres (712 ft) is one of the highest points in Hampshire, on the slopes of King's Hill, to the Alton - Basingstoke trunk road at 106 metres (348 ft).

The area in which Beech is situated is primarily rural. The parish has an area of 5.26 square kilometres (1262 acres) and is a broad mix of woodland, farmland and, in the village area, residential developments. In the past, the area has had an agriculturally based economy, although this influence has declined with modern farming practices.
