= Privett railway station =

Former railway station in Hampshire, England

Privett
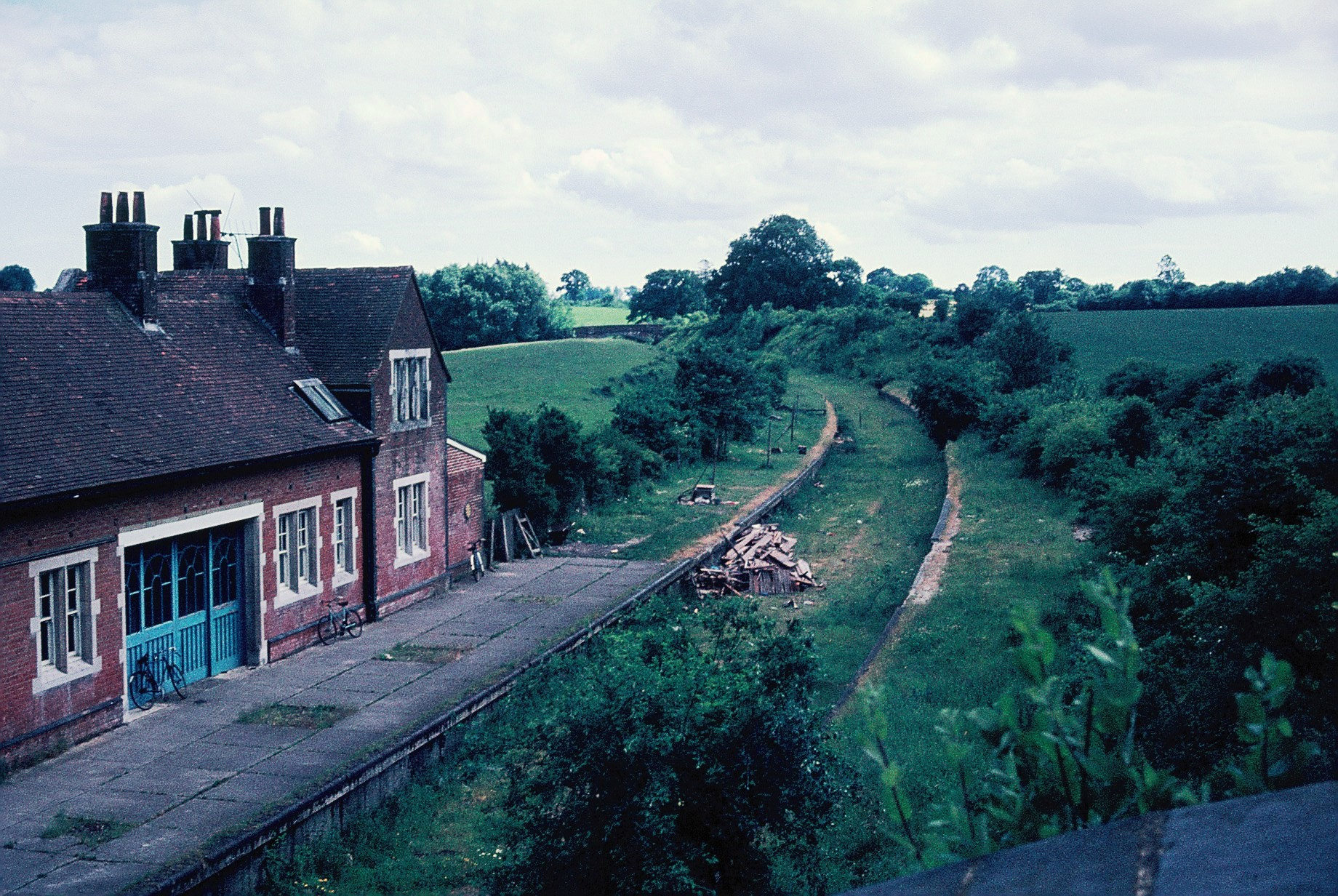
- The remains of the station in 1968

General information
- Location: Privett, East Hampshire; England
- Coordinates: 51.0531°N 1.0405°W
- Grid reference: SU675285
- Platforms: 2 (1903–1921); 1 (1921–1955)

Other information
- Status: Disused

History
- Pre-grouping: London & South Western Railway (1903–1923)
- Post-grouping: Southern Railway (1923 to 1948); Southern Region of British Railways (1948 to 1955)

Key dates
- 1 June 1903: Opened
- 7 February 1955: Closed
Location

Privett was an intermediate railway station on the Meon Valley line, which ran from Alton to Fareham in Hampshire, England, during the first half of the 20th century. Named after the hamlet of Privett, the station was located over half a mile (1 km) away from its namesake and was built in largely uninhabited countryside.

== History ==
=== Name ===
Opened on 1 June 1903 north of the village, a few yards east of the Alton road (now the A32), it caused Privett Halt in Gosport to be renamed to avoid confusion. This followed an earlier dispute over the exact name of the station. It was originally to be named 'West Tisted', following the convention that stations were named after the parish they were in. The family that owned Basing Park, the country estate on the edge of which the station was sited, insisted on the station being named Privett after the hamlet that formed part of their estate. This matter, coupled to the station being sited far from any local settlements but close to the Basing Park house, led many to conclude that the station was built specifically for the owners of the Park. The fact that a Carriage Drive was built leading from the house to the station only led credence to this rumour.

=== Facilities ===
Like all the stations on the line, Privett station accommodated double railway track and long platforms capable of serving 11-coach express trains. The large station buildings, designed by T. P. Figgis, were on the 'Down' platform and built in a highly regarded Tudor Revival style. They incorporated lavish passenger facilities including a large booking office with a tiled floor and a timber framed roof, separate gentlemen's and ladies' waiting rooms (as well as a large passenger shelter on the 'Up' platform) and a refreshments room. The station building also contained the station master's accommodation and other more functional rooms such as a goods office and lamp room. A signal box on the 'Up' platform controlled trains passing through the station as well as the extensive goods yard built to the south of the station site.

=== Engineering works ===
The Meon Valley Railway was a particularly difficult line to construct and it took six years to build the 22 miles of line. Its most dramatic feature was the 1,000 yards (910 m) Privett tunnel, the northern entrance of which was close to the station. The station was the summit of the line, at 519 feet (158 m) above sea level.

=== Traffic ===
Given the station's remote location, passenger numbers never matched the extensive facilities. In 1921, following the Meon Valley line's downgrading from a through route to a local line (see the line's main article for more information) the 'Up' platform was closed, as was the signal box, which remained in use purely to control the goods yard. All trains now called alongside the main station buildings on the former 'Down' platform.

=== Closure ===
The station remained at half capacity for the next 34 years. On 7 February 1955 the station was closed (along with West Meon and Tisted stations) and all services were withdrawn. The last special train to call at the station was on 6 February 1955 when an enthusiasts' special called 'The Hampshireman' briefly stopped at the station (which officially closed the next day).

== The site today ==
The station became a private house. The platform canopy was removed during conversion. Until the 1970s a fish pond occupied the former track space between the platforms but this has since been filled in.

== Public house ==
Following the opening of the railway a public house and hotel was built across the Alton-Gosport road from the station. This was initially named 'The Privett Bush' (a pun on the common plant named Privet). The hotel is still in business, now named 'The Angel'.

== Route ==
Preceding station	Disused railways	Following station
Tisted	British Rail; Southern Region; Meon Valley Line	West Meon

== See also ==
- List of closed railway stations in Britain
