= Droxford =

Village and parish in Hampshire, England

Coordinates: 50.964187°N 1.136467°W

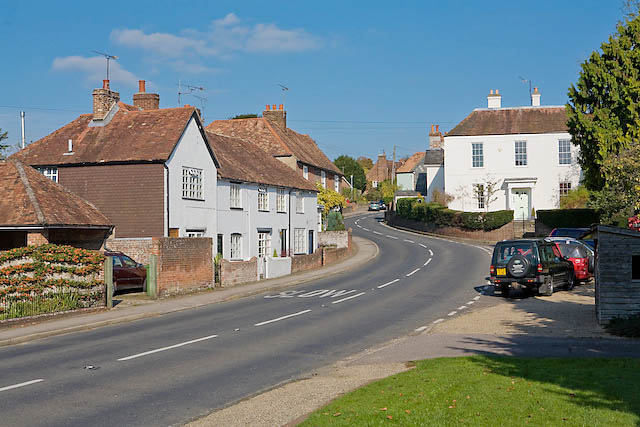
- High Street

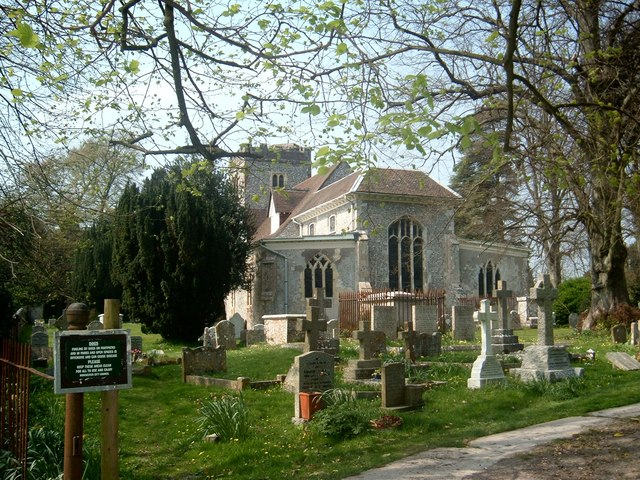
- The local church is medieval and dedicated to All Saints and St Mary

- Location within Hampshire
- Population: 600; 675 (2011 Census)
- OS grid reference: SU 60738 18662
- District: City of Winchester
- Shire county: Hampshire
- Region: South East
- Country: England
- Sovereign state: United Kingdom
- Post town: SOUTHAMPTON
- Postcode district: SO32
- Dialling code: 01489
- Police: Hampshire and Isle of Wight
- Fire: Hampshire and Isle of Wight
- Ambulance: South Central
- UK Parliament: Winchester

Droxford (arch. Drokensford) is a village in Hampshire, England.

== Geography ==
The village is clustered with slight ribbon development along its main, north–south, undulating road. It is entirely on the lower half of the western slopes of the Meon valley. Farms and residential outbuildings stretch to the west, north and south. It is centred around the Church of St Mary and All Saints, a mainly 13th- and 14th-century church with a 1599-built tower, together listed in the highest category for heritage. Next to the church is the old rectory dating from the 18th century. The village is 3.5 miles (5.6 km) east of the nearest town Bishop's Waltham.

It is toward the centre-west of the South Downs National Park which was upgraded and expanded from a smaller AONB within which it sat in 2011. The non-dualled, non-trunk A32 passes through the village between Gosport and Alton which is largely bypassed by two motorways in the national network known as the A3 and M3. The former Meon Valley Railway has been converted into a lengthy footpath running from West Meon to Knowle Junction and the railway station converted to a house, a short walk across the water meadows from the village.

== Amenities ==
The village has a convergence of national long-distance footpaths, a number of holiday lets and bed-and-breakfast establishments, a post office, a refuelling garage, one pub and a village hall. Neighbouring isolated Shirrell Heath commands a view of the Hamble and Meon valleys, with the often "blue" hills of the Isle of Wight on the horizon.

== History ==
During the late 5th and early 6th centuries, the Jutes inhabited the Meon Valley, and at Droxford there is the remains of a large Jutish cemetery that has produced various grave goods, providing evidence of their settlement.

The Manor of Drocenesforda (Droxford) was granted to the Prior and monks of St. Swithun, Winchester, by King Egbert in 826. In 939 king Æthelstan granted 17 hides of land at Droxford to his half-sister Eadburh. By the time of the Domesday Survey Droxford which included much of Swanmore (the name of one of its tythings) and Shedfield had passed to the Bishop of Winchester, to support the monks. This arrangement continued until 1551 when it was surrendered to the crown. It was passed on to the Earl of Wiltshire.

The bishopric regained the manor in 1558, holding it until the Civil War. During the rule of Parliament the manor was transferred into private hands but on the Restoration of King Charles II in 1660 it was restored to the bishopric.

This situation continued until 1869 when the manor (amounting to a lessened, mid-19th-century, wealth and control of land management in the parish) was removed from the bishopric as part of the Bishops Resignation Act 1869, and the area of the parish glebe (church lands) had also been substantially reduced by this time. A Primitive Methodist church or chapel was built in 1886.

A railway came to serve Droxford in 1903 across the river in the neighbouring more rural parish with the building of the Meon Valley Railway. Droxford railway station was built to the north east of the village and settlement grew around the station including a hotel, railway workers' cottages and a cluster of private homes. These extended to the north to the Brock Bridge or Brockbridge farm and mill which retains its name.

In June 1944 Allied leaders including Winston Churchill, Dwight Eisenhower, and Charles de Gaulle met in a railway carriage at Droxford railway station to discuss the imminent D-Day invasion. There is a bench in the village to commemorate this meeting of world leaders in Droxford. British Railways closed the railway to passengers in 1955, and freight in 1962. After being used for testing and storage purposes it was finally removed in the 1970s.

=== Church and landowner poverty relief ===
Aside from its state-incepted poor rate relief, the parish had minor legacies since the late 17th century and medium legacies relative to its small population since the 1850s for its poorest residents.

John Arthur, by will 1722, endowed for the poor of "the tithings of Droxford and Hill" £30; John Dee, by will 1749, gave for the local poor £50 (equivalent to £10,000 in 2025); and the Rev. James Cutler, formerly rector of the parish, by will 1782, left £50. These sums, with accumulated interest, were laid out in the purchase of £215 1/20 "consols" (consolidated investments), by 1905 held by the official trustees, the dividends, amounting to £5 11/30 a year being applied with the similar-size Boucher charity.

In 1850 James George Boucher, by will, bequeathed to the rector and churchwardens a sum by 1905 growing to £190 18s. 7d. consols, with the official trustees, for the benefit of the poor of the parish. The dividends, amounting to £4 23/30.

These dividends were for example in 1905 distributed thus: to the vicar of Shedfield £4..., to the vicar of Swanmore £3..., to be distributed in those districts, and £2 13s. 6d. was given in money to ten poor people in Droxford (i.e. £2 27/40, equivalent to £280 in 2025).

By Inclosure Award of 9 May 1855, two allotments of 4 acres each were allotted for the use of the poor of Shedfield, the rents of which, amounting to about £25 a year, were still in 1905 applied for public uses, subject, however, to yearly rent-charges. Under the same award 5 acres was allotted as a recreation ground. By deed of 1880 a site and buildings were given at minimal value for the purpose of reading and recreation rooms.
