= Meon Valley Trail =

Meon Valley Trail may refer to:

- Meon Valley Trail (cycle trail), a 16 km (9.9 mi) circular trail for cyclists in Hampshire, England
- Meon Valley Trail (footpath), an 18 km (11 miles) bridleway section of the Meon Valley Trail in Hampshire, England

== See also ==
- Meon Valley Railway
