= East Tisted =

Village and parish in Hampshire, England

Coordinates: 51.08515°N 0.99984°W

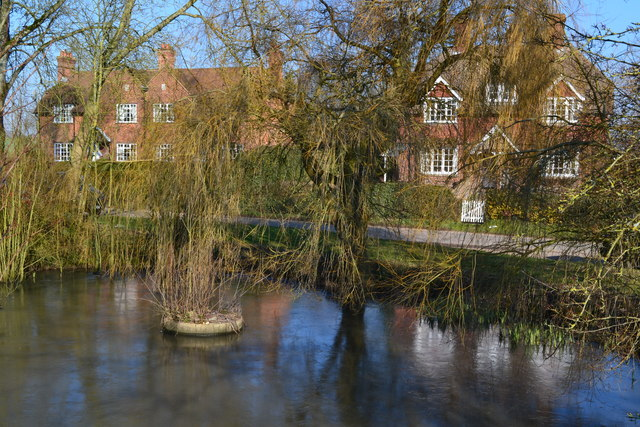
- Village pond at East Tisted

- Location within Hampshire
- Population: 221; 209 (2011 Census)
- OS grid reference: SU701322
- Civil parish: East Tisted
- District: East Hampshire
- Shire county: Hampshire
- Region: South East
- Country: England
- Sovereign state: United Kingdom
- Post town: Alton
- Postcode district: GU34
- Police: Hampshire and Isle of Wight
- Fire: Hampshire and Isle of Wight
- Ambulance: South Central
- UK Parliament: East Hampshire

East Tisted (/ˈtaɪstɛd/) is a village and civil parish in the East Hampshire district of Hampshire, England. It is 4.8 miles (7.7 km) south of Alton on the A32 road.

The village lies 50 miles south-west of London, 14 miles east of the city of Winchester, 3.5 miles north-east of the village of West Tisted, 2.5 miles west of the village of Selborne, and 1.5 miles west of the village of Newton Valence. It has a population of about 200, residing in about 100 households.

== Etymology ==
East Tisted was first settled in the early medieval period and was given its name by these early Anglo-Saxon settlers. Its name comes from the Old English 'Ticce' and 'Stede' meaning Ticce's Farmstead. Alternatively the name might come from the word Old English word 'Ticcen' meaning young goat or kid. Nearby West Tisted, which shares the name, predates East Tisted in terms of settlements and records.

== History ==
In the 13th century Alice Holt Forest was the second largest hunting forest in Hampshire, a perambulation of the Forest in this century shows East Tisted as being part of it:

From Rompesdene (Junction of A32 with Petersfield Road) to Tusted (East Tisted) then the high way (A32) through the middle of the ville of Farendone (Farringdon) and through the middle of the ville of Chautone (Chawton)

The manor of East Tisted dates back to the 13th century when it was granted by the Crown to Adam de Gurdon. The manor passed by inheritance to the Norton family. Mary I of England stayed with John Norton at Tisted on 11 July 1554 as she travelled to her wedding at Winchester.

In 1644, the manor and estates were seized by the Commonwealth from the Norton family as Sir Richard Norton was a supporter of the Royalist cause: the family regained the estates in 1661, after the Restoration. They passed by marriage to the Paulet/Powlet families. In 1808, the estate was sold to the Scott family.

A map made in 1743 held in the Winchester college archives shows the centre of the parish (going no further east than Goleigh Wood) as having around 15 individual properties. This map is somewhat mysterious as no known cause for its creation is known, nor why Winchester college holds it, as it never held any lands in East Tisted, only Ropley. It also shows a number of now disappeared buildings to the west of the modern day A32.

In the 18th century, the parish of East Tisted had a share in the income from the turnpike tolls charged on the main road between Basingstoke and Winchester. This was used to fund a village school.

== Rotherfield Park ==
Just west of East Tisted is Rotherfield Park, an ancient estate first mentioned in 1015 as Hrytherafeld meaning the open and for cattle. There was likely settlement here predating a hunting park, which is medieval in origins and is first mentioned in the 16th century. Near to the park is a large amount of prehistoric activity.

== Amenities ==
The village church, St. James, and the Rectory lie to the west of the village on the east side of the A32 road. The church dates back to the 14th century, it has the family tombs of the Norton family. The church was largely rebuilt in 1846.

Tisted railway station and the route of the Meon Valley Railway—both closed since 1955—lie to the east of the village. The nearest railway station is 4.7 miles (7.7 km) north of the village, at Alton.

East Tisted had a primary school, also serving some of the surrounding villages, until its closure in 1981 due to falling numbers.

Rotherfield Park lies to the west of the village, on the opposite side of the A32 road to that of the village.
