= Wickham railway station (Hampshire) =

Former railway station in Wickham, Winchester, England

Wickham
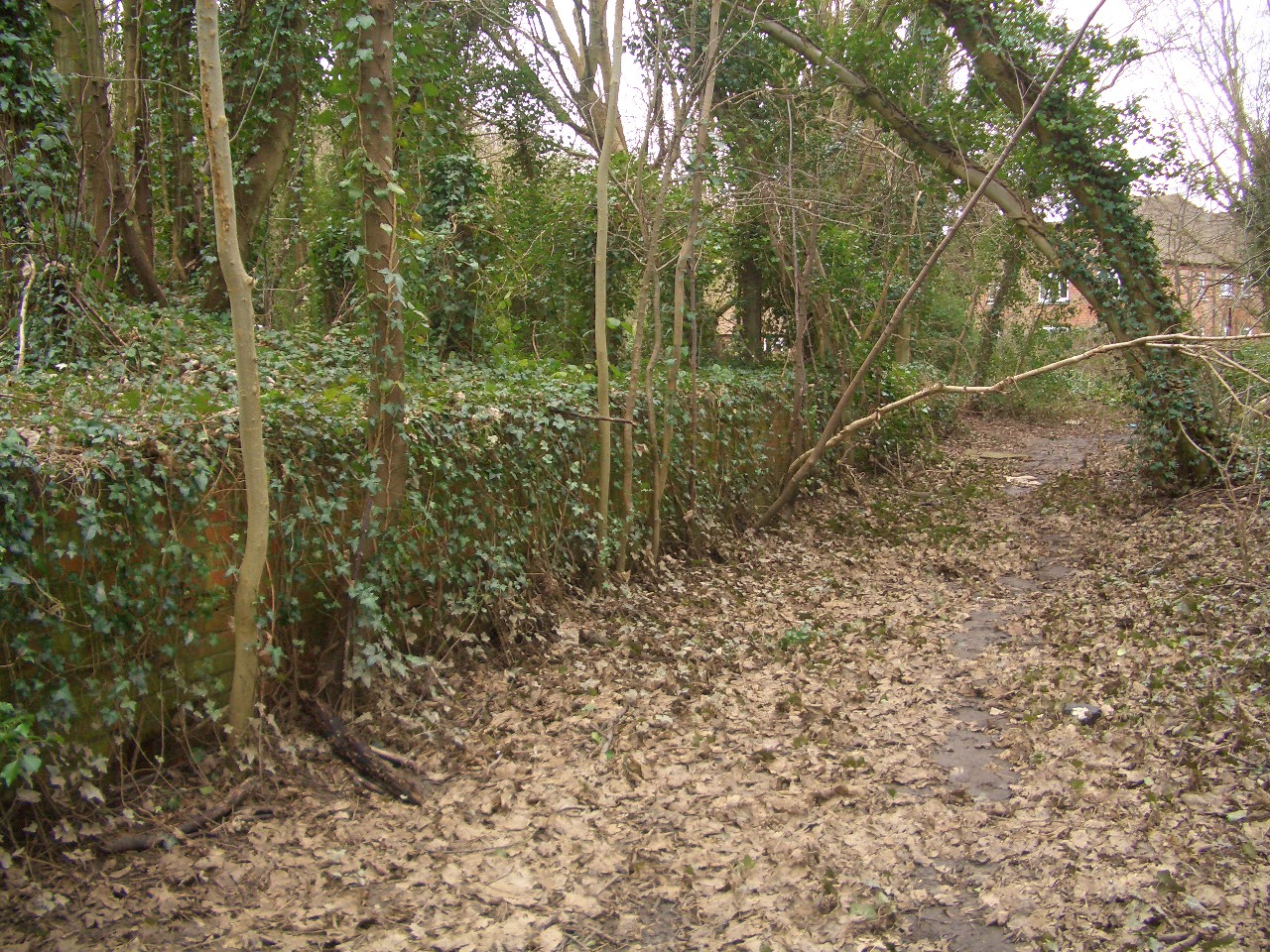
- The overgrown goods platform at the site of the station at Wickham in 2009

General information
- Location: Wickham, Winchester; England
- Coordinates: 50.9015°N 1.1833°W
- Grid reference: SU575117
- Platforms: 2

Other information
- Status: Disused

History
- Original company: London and South Western Railway
- Pre-grouping: London and South Western Railway
- Post-grouping: Southern Railway

Key dates
- 1 June 1903: Station opened
- 7 February 1955: Station closed to passengers
- 30 April 1962: Station closed to goods
Location

Wickham (Hants) railway station served the village of Wickham in Hampshire, England. It was on the Meon Valley line of the London and South Western Railway. The station opened in 1903 and closed to passengers in 1955 and to goods in 1962. The main building was to a design by the architect T. P. Figgis.

Wickham station was a fairly busy hub for local agriculture despite modest passenger numbers, particularly in summer when “strawberry specials” would run. Over time, declines in rural traffic and rising competition from road transport decreased the station’s viability, leading to its eventual closures.

== History ==
=== Opening ===
The station was opened by the London and South Western Railway on 1 June 1903. It was on the Meon Valley line between Droxford and Fareham; Knowle Halt, between Wickham and Fareham, opened in 1907. The Meon Valley line had been authorised on 3 June 1897, and opened on 1 June 1903.

=== Closure ===
The station closed to passengers on 7 February 1955 and to goods traffic on 30 April 1962. The prospect was raised of Wickham becoming part of a heritage railway in the 1960s after closure of the line. Indeed, the line was leased by Charles Ashby from West Meon to Droxford, through Wickham and the line used for testing of his Sadler Pacerailer. Several locomotives arrived, including a Terrier now based on the Isle of Wight. However it was not to be. Hopes were dashed when the connection with the Eastleigh to Fareham line was lifted. This left the line isolated and the last train to run was a USA tank loco up the line. After this date the line was lifted by BR and some sections purchased by Hampshire County Council. The section between Mislingford and Knowle, through Wickham, is owned by Rookesbury Estates limited who lease the former line out to Hampshire County Council as a footpath.

== The site today ==
The station was demolished after closure and the site is now part of a woodland path.

== Route ==
Preceding station	Disused railways	Following station
Droxford; Line and station closed	British Rail; Southern Region; Meon Valley Railway line	Knowle Halt; Line and station closed
