= West Meon railway station =

Former railway station in the City of Winchester, England

West Meon
- West Meon station soon after opening

General information
- Location: West Meon, City of Winchester, Hampshire; England
- Coordinates: 51.0086°N 1.0862°W
- Grid reference: SU642237
- Platforms: Two

Other information
- Status: Disused

History
- Original company: London and South Western Railway
- Pre-grouping: London and South Western Railway
- Post-grouping: Southern Railway; Southern Region of British Railways

Key dates
- 1 June 1903: Opened
- 7 February 1955: Closed
Location

West Meon was a railway station in West Meon, Hampshire, southern England. It was an intermediate railway station on the Meon Valley line, which opened from Alton to Fareham on 1 June 1903. The main station building was designed by T. P. Figgis. It closed in 1955 and the station area is now a picnic area and nature reserve.

== History ==
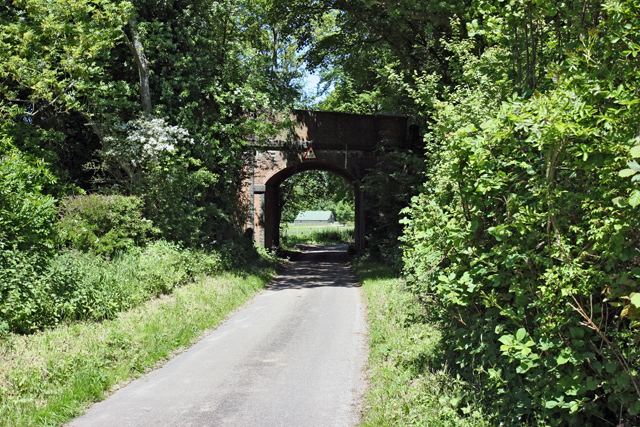
Bridge supporting the disused line, near to the station

The Meon Valley line was particularly difficult to construct, costing the equivalent of 27 million pounds in 1983 values.). The terrain around West Meon was very uneven, requiring large works of civil engineering to build the railway. In quick succession, heading into West Meon from the north, the line required a tall embankment with a large tunnel driven through it to carry it over the A272, a tunnel and, immediately before the station, an impressive viaduct of wrought iron over the River Meon valley itself.

=== Closure ===
Station platforms, 2014

Never a busy station, its only substantive commission was to move a complete farm in 1933. It was finally closed on 7 February 1955. The station buildings remained for several years, but were eventually demolished for hard core rubble for a car park in Denmead. The four-span West Meon viaduct was demolished in 1957.

== The site today ==
The only remains today are the 600-foot-long (180 m) platforms which were cleared of trees in 2015 to provide a grassy area with picnic tables. An interpretation board has been installed to provide a brief description of the scene and an Ordnance Survey benchmark. The site of the former goods yard is now a car park for users of the Meon Valley Trail and the approach road from the village is still called 'Station Road'. The goods storage yard opposite the platform area was converted by volunteers into a wildlife area for the local primary school. A pupil won a school competition by naming the area 'The Nature Station'.

== Route ==
Preceding station	Disused railways	Following station
Privett	British Rail; Southern Region; Meon Valley Railway line	Droxford

== See also ==
- List of closed railway stations in Britain
