= Tisted railway station =

Former railway station in Hampshire, England

Tisted
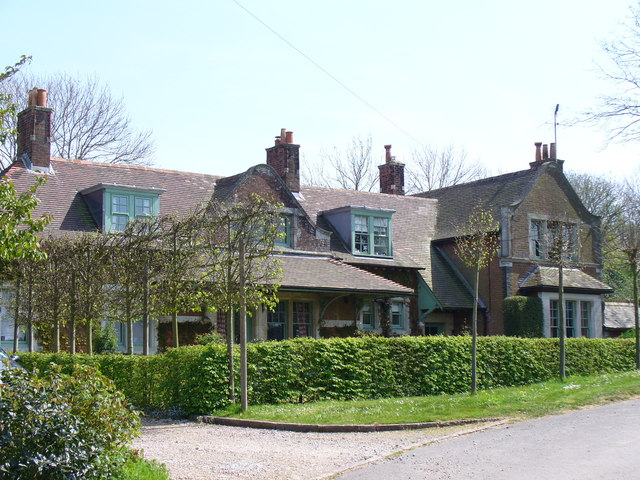

General information
- Location: East Tisted, East Hampshire; England
- Coordinates: 51.0849°N 0.9922°W
- Grid reference: SU706321
- Platforms: 2

Other information
- Status: Disused

History
- Original company: London and South Western Railway
- Pre-grouping: London and South Western Railway
- Post-grouping: Southern Railway; Southern Region of British Railways

Key dates
- 1 June 1903: Opened
- 7 February 1955: Closed
Location

Tisted was a railway station on the Meon Valley line, which served the village of East Tisted, in Hampshire, England.

== History ==
The station opened in 1903 as a stop on the Meon Valley Railway; it was closed in 1955 due to low patronage of the service. The main station building, designed by T. P. Figgis, is now a private residence.

The last train, hauled by two T9 class locomotives (30301 and 30732), left the station on 6 February 1955.

== The site today ==
The station building survived the closure and is now a private residence. A British Rail Mark 1 carriage sits at the platform; this is one of the former Pilkington Glass Railtour set of coaches.

== Route ==
Preceding station	Disused railways	Following station
Farringdon Halt	British Rail; Southern Region; Meon Valley Railway line	Privett
