= Pacerailer =

Railbus Prototype

- The prototype Pacerailer at the derelict platforms of Droxford station in April 1968
- Manufacturer: Sadler Rail Coach Company
- Designer: Charles Sadler Ashby
- Constructed: 1960s
- Scrapped: 1970s
- Number built: 1
- Number scrapped: 1
- Capacity: ~48

Specifications
- Doors: 2 (one each side)
- Steep gradient: 1:10
- AAR wheel arrangement: B
- Track gauge: 4 ft 8 1/2 in (1,435 mm) standard gauge

The Pacerailer was a prototype railbus, a vehicle consisting of a bus-style body on a four-wheeled railway-vehicle chassis, built by Charles Sadler Ashby's Sadler Rail Coach Company (SRC) in the 1960s. Unlike most other railbuses, it was intended as a luxurious vehicle which could give good views on scenic routes, and the bodywork and seating was based on motor coaches rather than buses.

Following the closure of Droxford station, on the Meon Valley Railway in Hampshire, both it and the track south to Wickham station were leased by SRC, who used the line to demonstrate the Pacerailer to potential buyers. A section of the line was rebuilt with a 1:10 incline to demonstrate the vehicle's abilities on steep gradients. Weighing just 6 tons, it had a good power-to-weight ratio and could reach 70 mph (110 km/h). The wheels had metal flanges but also solid rubber tyres.

There were problem with vandalism at the site, with the tracks intentionally blocked and points jammed in an effort to derail vehicles, and on 4 May 1970 the Pacerailer prototype was burned out and badly damaged. Ashby was in advanced negotiations to reopen the line between Cowes and Ryde on the Isle of Wight using Pacerailers. It was alleged that one of the Isle of Wight's bus companies was behind the vandalism and arson at Droxford. The underframe survives; as of 2022 it is currently located on the Isle of Wight Steam Railway, used as the structure for a pedestrian bridge.

Ashby died in February 1976 and SRC was dissolved in December 1976, having failed to sell the Pacerailer to any railway company.

A similar concept, the Pacer, was successfully developed by British Rail in the 1980s.
