= Stotfold (house) =

Grade II listed building in London, England

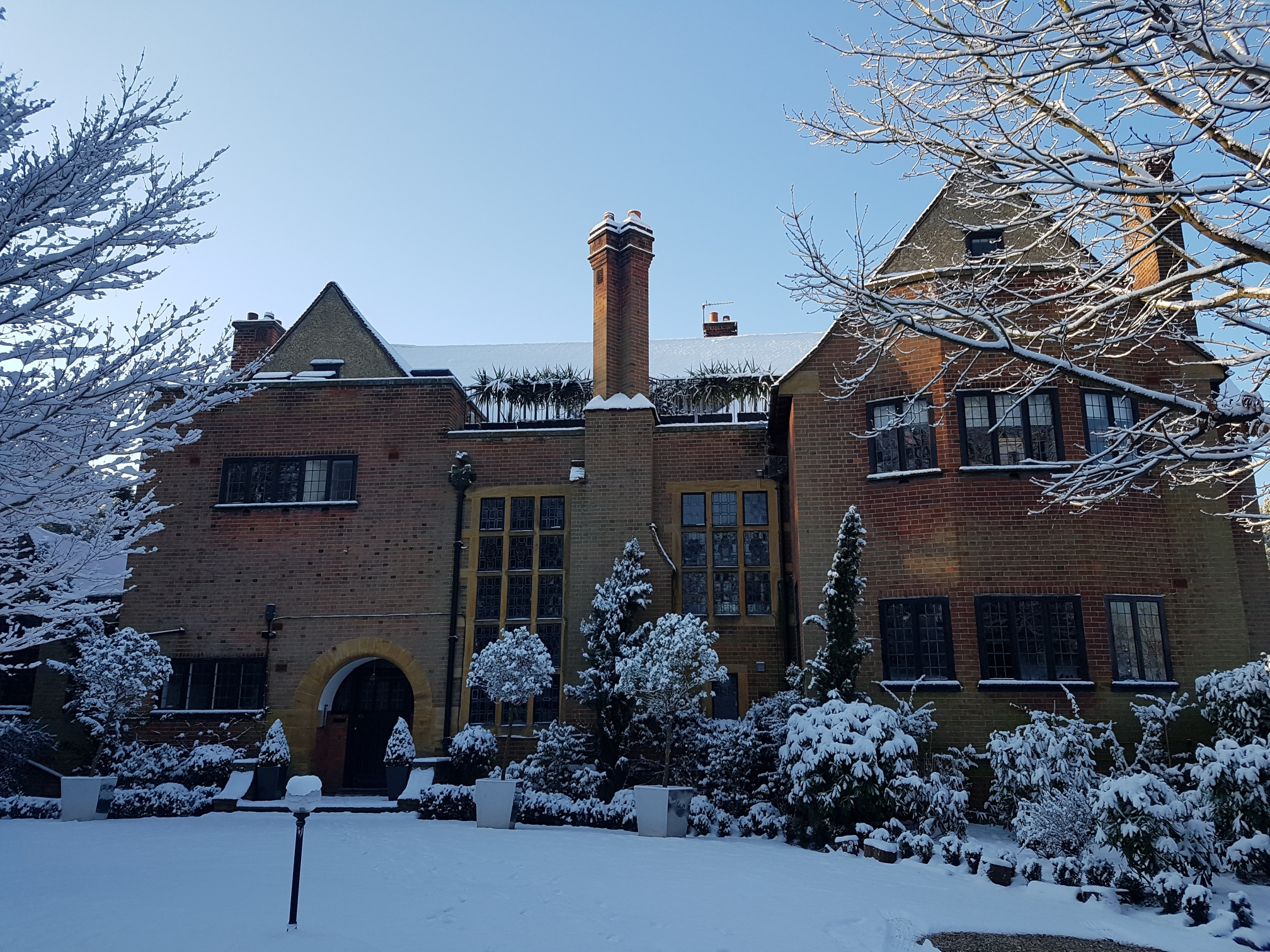
- Stotfold, February 2018
- Interactive map of Stotfold
- 51°24′36″N 0°02′27″E
- Type: House

History
- Built: 1907

Site notes
- Architect: Thomas Phillips Figgis

Stotfold is a 1907 Arts & Crafts house in Mavelstone Road in the London Borough of Bromley. It became a Grade II listed building in 1993 for being "of special architectural or historic interest considered to be of national importance and therefore worth protecting".

A "huge baronial style house", it was designed by Thomas Phillips Figgis, for John Roe Hickman of Buck & Hickman. In the 1950s, it was converted into flats.

It is featured in English Heritage's collection of architectural photography. It is also featured in "Great Houses of the Arts and Crafts Movement: One Hundred Masterworks 1860–1914" by David Cole, published 9 Jun 2026
