= Meon Valley Trail (cycle trail) =

Coordinates: 50.919°N 1.184°W

The Meon Valley Trail is a 16 kilometres (9.9 mi) trail for cyclists in Hampshire, England. The trail passes through Butser Hill, Clanfield, West Meon and East Meon.

Full details of the route can be found on the Hampshire County Council website.
