= A32 road =

Road in Hampshire, England

A32

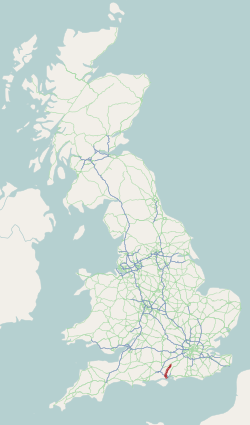

Route information
- Length: 29.1 mi (46.8 km)

Major junctions
- South end: South Street (B3333) in Gosport; 50.7942°N 1.1187°W
- A27 in Fareham M27 in Fareham A334 in Wickham A272 in West Meon
- North end: A31 in Chawton; 51.1318°N 0.9944°W

Location
- Country: United Kingdom
- Primary destinations: Fareham

Road network
- Roads in the United Kingdom; Motorways; A and B road zones
← A31	→ A33

The A32 is a road in Hampshire, southern England, that links Gosport and Alton. Starting at Gosport, facing Portsmouth, it travels north via Fareham, Wickham, Droxford, before joining the A31 road near Alton. The road is 29.2 miles (47.0 km) long from the seafront at Gosport to the roundabout with the A31 near Alton, and has entirely non-primary status.

== Route description ==
Despite its non-primary status, the road forms the main access to the town of Gosport. At rush-hour times, the road is often extremely congested (northbound in the morning rush, southbound in the evenings) as commuters head through central Fareham from the Gosport peninsula to the M27.

The main pinch-point is the 1-mile (1.6 km) long section of road between the Newgate Lane Flyover (junction B3334) and the Quay Street Roundabout in central Fareham where traffic delays often cause northbound tailbacks of 3 miles (4.8 km) at peak times. During the evening rush, traffic can at times back up to the M27 at Junction 11 and along the inside lane of the motorway.

There have for many years been plans to provide a light rail solution to the traffic problem by utilising the former Gosport to Fareham railway line but this was scrapped in 2005. Part of the former railway line has since been converted for "Eclipse" bus rapid transit routes.

The A32 is a popular route for motorcyclists, particularly at weekends; the cafe ( now Loomies, formerly a "Little Chef") where the A272 crosses the A32 at West Meon has become central meeting place for many groups of riders. The historic site of Fort Widley to the south is easily accessed from Wickham and is a popular route for motorcyclists.

== Route history ==
The original 1923 designation of the A32 used to run further north from Alton, terminating at Loudwater, Buckinghamshire on the A40. Southbound, it followed the current A4094 through Bourne End, the current A4155 through Marlow and Henley-on-Thames into Reading, the current B3031 to Whitley Wood and the current B3349 through Spencers Wood, Riseley and Hook.

== Junction list ==
County	Location	mi	km	Destinations	Notes
Hampshire	Gosport	0.0	0.0	South Street (B3333)	Southern terminus adjacent to Gosport Fountain; continues as B3333 beyond point
Hampshire	Fareham	5.5	8.9	A27 / Portland Street / Quay Street – City centre, Sarisbury, Titchfield	Southern terminus of A27 concurrency
Hampshire	Fareham	5.8– 6.0	9.3– 9.7	M27 / A27 east – Portsmouth, Southampton, Portchester	Northern terminus of A27 concurrency
Hampshire	Fareham	7.3	11.7	M27 east – Portsmouth, Gosport	Access only from M27 west to A32 north and from A32 south to M27 east; M27 junction 10
Hampshire	Wickham	9.3	15.0	A334 west (Fareham Road) / Grindall Fld to B2177 – Botley	Information signed northbound only; eastern terminus of A334
Hampshire	West Meon	20.7	33.3	A272 – Petersfield, Winchester, Bramdean, Langrish	
Hampshire	Chawton	29.1	46.8	A31 / Northfield Lane / Winchester Road to A339 / A33 – Winchester, Alton, Farnham, Basingstoke, Reading, Four Marks, Alresford, Odiham, Bentley, Chawton	Northern terminus
1.000 mi = 1.609 km; 1.000 km = 0.621 mi

== In popular culture ==
The A32 is referenced in a children's song.
