= West Meon =

Village and parish in Hampshire, England

Coordinates: 51°00′43″N 1°05′16″W

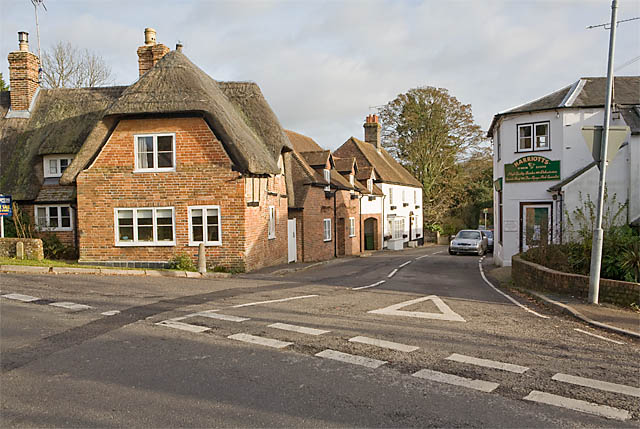

- Location within Hampshire
- Population: 724 (2011 Census)
- OS grid reference: SU640240
- Civil parish: West Meon
- District: City of Winchester
- Shire county: Hampshire
- Region: South East
- Country: England
- Sovereign state: United Kingdom
- Post town: PETERSFIELD
- Postcode district: GU32
- Dialling code: 01730
- Police: Hampshire and Isle of Wight
- Fire: Hampshire and Isle of Wight
- Ambulance: South Central
- UK Parliament: Winchester

West Meon is a village and civil parish in Hampshire, England, with a population of 749 people at the 2011 census.

== Geography ==
It is 2 3/4 miles (4.4 km) north-west of East Meon, on the headwaters of the River Meon. Its closest town is Petersfield which is 6 1/2 miles (10.5 km) to the east.

There are a number of walks around the village and surrounding hills along the South Downs Way and the bridleway provided by the, now defunct Meon Valley Railway Line, which leads 11 miles (17.7 km) south from West Meon to Wickham.

== History ==
A charter of 932 in which King Æthelstan granted West Meon to the thegn Æthelweard includes a detailed account of the boundary of the estate which almost coincides with the boundary of the modern parish of West Meon. The Manor of West Meon was listed in the Domesday Book as owned by the Bishop of Winchester. A charter of 1205 confirmed the grant of land to the Prior and Convent of St. Swithun, Winchester, in whose hands it remained until the Dissolution of the Monasteries. In 1541 the manor was granted to the Dean and Chapter of Winchester by Henry VIII, and the maintenance of six theology students at each of the universities of Oxford and Cambridge was ordered. In 1544 the king changed this regulation, and the manor was granted to Thomas Wriothesley, Earl of Southampton, in whose family the manor remained until 1677.

Other lands in West Meon Parish held by the Wriothesley family were the manors of Hall Park, Coombe and Woodlands. Another manor, called Punsholt, was first mentioned in 1341 when it was held by Walter de Ticheborne. Later the manor was combined with that of West Tisted and followed the same descent. Punsholt Farm in the North of the Parish indicates the site of the manor.

The manor of Woodlands is now occupied by the Woodlands Estate, situated in the north of the parish. Woodlands is notable for its collection of model farm buildings, built by the Nicholson family of Basing Park, Privett. Woodlands once boasted a coaching inn, shop, school, and a chapel, all of which are now private residences.

During the Civil War West Meon was the scene of several skirmishes prior to the Battle of Cheriton, which was fought on 29 March 1644.

The remains of a Roman villa have been uncovered in Lippen Wood, a mile from the village. The outer walls of the villa, some hypocaust pillars and a patterned mosaic floor were found during a 1905 excavation.

Thomas Lord of cricket ground fame retired to the village in 1830. The eponymous pub is in the high street. British spy Guy Burgess lived in the village and his ashes were interred in the family plot in the churchyard. Between West Meon and East Meon is Westbury House which was built in 1904, after the previous Palladian mansion on the estate was destroyed by fire.

== Woodlands ==
Woodlands is a hamlet situated in the North of the parish. Originally a large portion of land held under the Manor of West Meon, it was separated in 1677. Another Manor, known as Punsholt, was first mentioned in 1341. A chapel was situated here, dedicated to St Mary the Virgin, but by the early 17th century the chapel was in ruins, and sat nearby to an old Manor House. Punsholt Farm is built on the site of the former Chapel of St Mary.

The hamlet is notable for its collection of late 19th century architecture, predominantly built by the Basing Park Estate, which had engulfed Woodlands by the 1880’s. A Chapel was erected by the estate in 1889, and built in the traditional “Nicholson Style”- a local name for the style of the buildings erected by the Nicholson family of Basing Park. Woodlands also boasted a school paid for by the estate, in a now private house known as School Cottage.

A coaching inn also existed here, known as the Three Horseshoes. The establishment was operating from at least the 18th century, and finally closed in 1903, when the license was transferred to a new establishment at Droxford. The Woodlands Estate was formed in 1945, when the property was purchased from Basing Park by the 4th Baron Northbrook.

== Notable Buildings ==
West Meon House, former Rectory now private house.

West Meon Parish Church, built in mid-19th century in flint and stone.
