= T. P. Figgis =

British architect

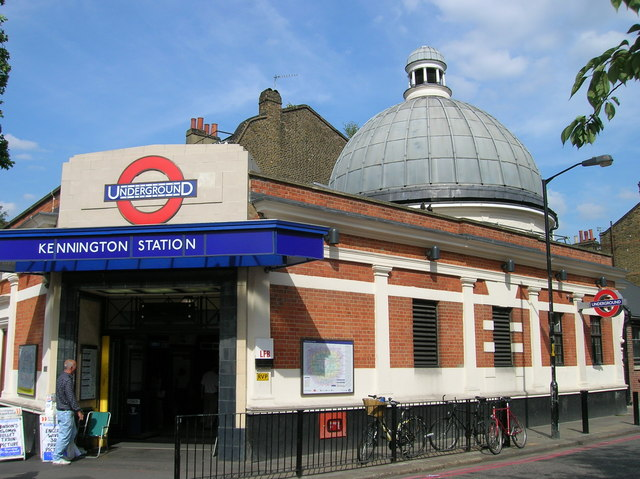
Figgis's Kennington station. The canopy and display panel above the entrance are later additions.

T. P. (Thomas Phillips) Figgis (1858–1948) was a British architect working in the late 19th and early 20th centuries. His work included private houses as well as public buildings.

T. Phillips Figgis was the second son of Thomas Gilbert Figgis from Dublin, Ireland, and his wife Margaret Phillips.

Some of his best-known works are the original station buildings for the City & South London Railway (C&SLR, now part of London Underground's Northern line) which opened in 1890. Figgis designed the stations at Stockwell, Oval, Kennington, Elephant and Castle and Borough. When the C&SLR was extended, he later designed a station at Clapham North and the station and C&SLR's offices at Moorgate. Most of Figgis's buildings for the C&SLR have been replaced or substantially altered; only Kennington (with minor alterations) and Moorgate remain.

Other railway buildings he designed included the four new stations on the Meon Valley Railway.

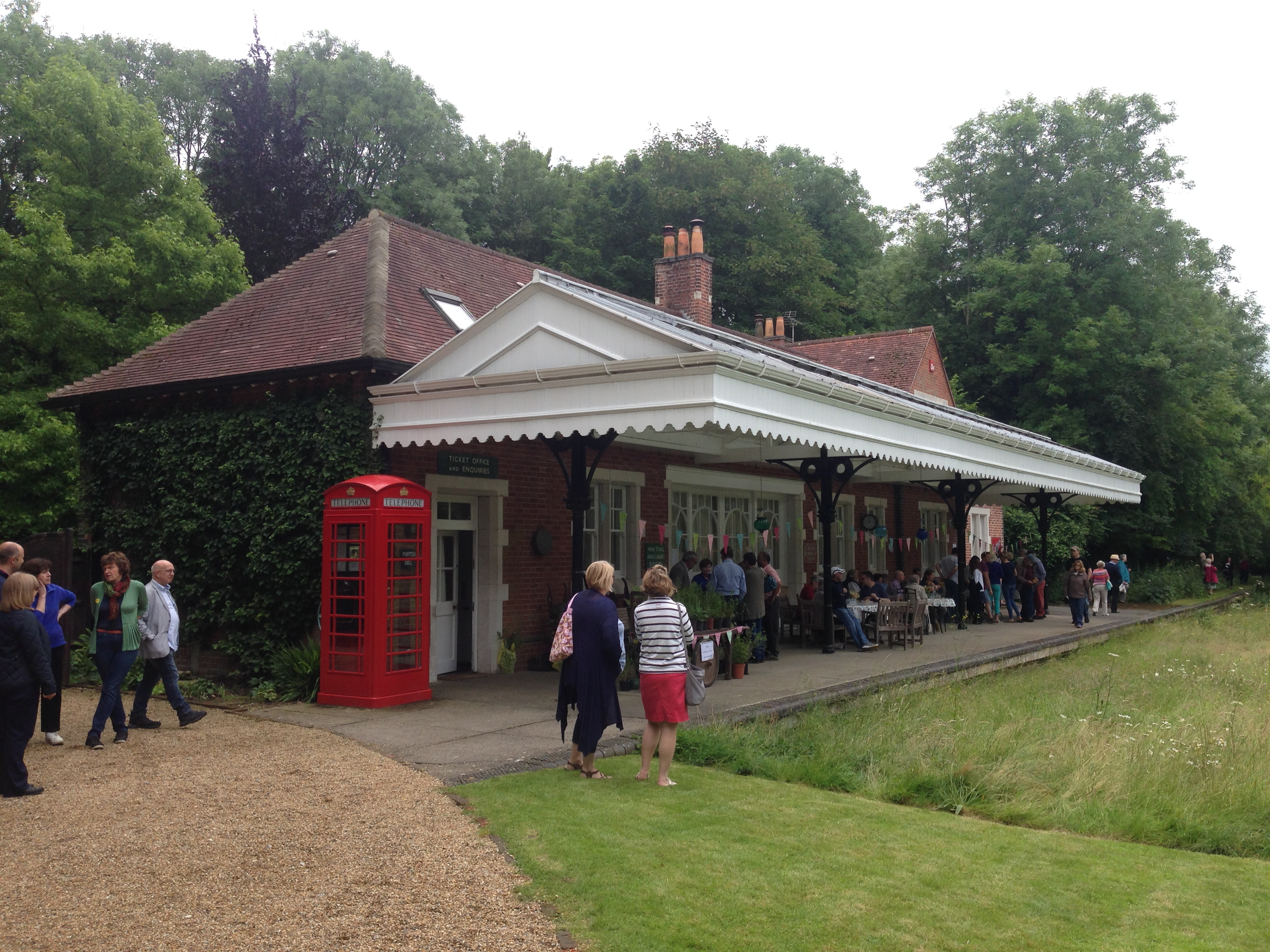
Droxford station 2016

He undertook several commissions for the Presbyterian Church of England, including St Columba's Church, in Alfred Street, Oxford (now a United Reformed Church), an extension to St Paul's Church, Isle of Dogs, and St Ninian's Church, Golders Green (now a Hindu temple).

He was the architect of Stotfold, a 1907 listed Arts & Crafts house in Bickley, Kent.
