= Meon Valley Railway =

Former local railway in the south of England

Overview
- Status: Closed and dismantled
- Owner: London and South Western Railway
- Locale: Hampshire, United Kingdom
- Termini: Alton; Fareham
- Stations: 9

Service
- Operator(s): London and South Western Railway

History
- Opened: 1 June 1903
- Closed: 5 February 1955 (passengers, freight between Farringdon and Droxford); 30 April 1962 (freight between Fareham and Droxford); 13 August 1968 (freight between Alton and Farringdon)

Technical
- Line length: 22 miles 24 chains (35.89 km)
- Number of tracks: One
- Track gauge: 4 ft 8 1/2 in (1,435 mm) standard gauge
- Highest elevation: 519 ft (158 m)

The Meon Valley Railway was a cross-country railway in Hampshire, England, that ran for 22 miles (36 km) between Alton and Fareham, closely following the course of the River Meon. At its northern (Alton) end, it joined with the Alton Line from London. It was conceived as an additional main line to the area around Gosport, and it was opened in 1903. It never fulfilled its planned potential, and remained a local line through sparsely populated agricultural areas, and it closed to passenger services in 1955; some local goods services continued until total closure in 1968.

The name does not refer to an independent company; it was constructed and run by the London and South Western Railway (LSWR).

== History ==
=== Background ===
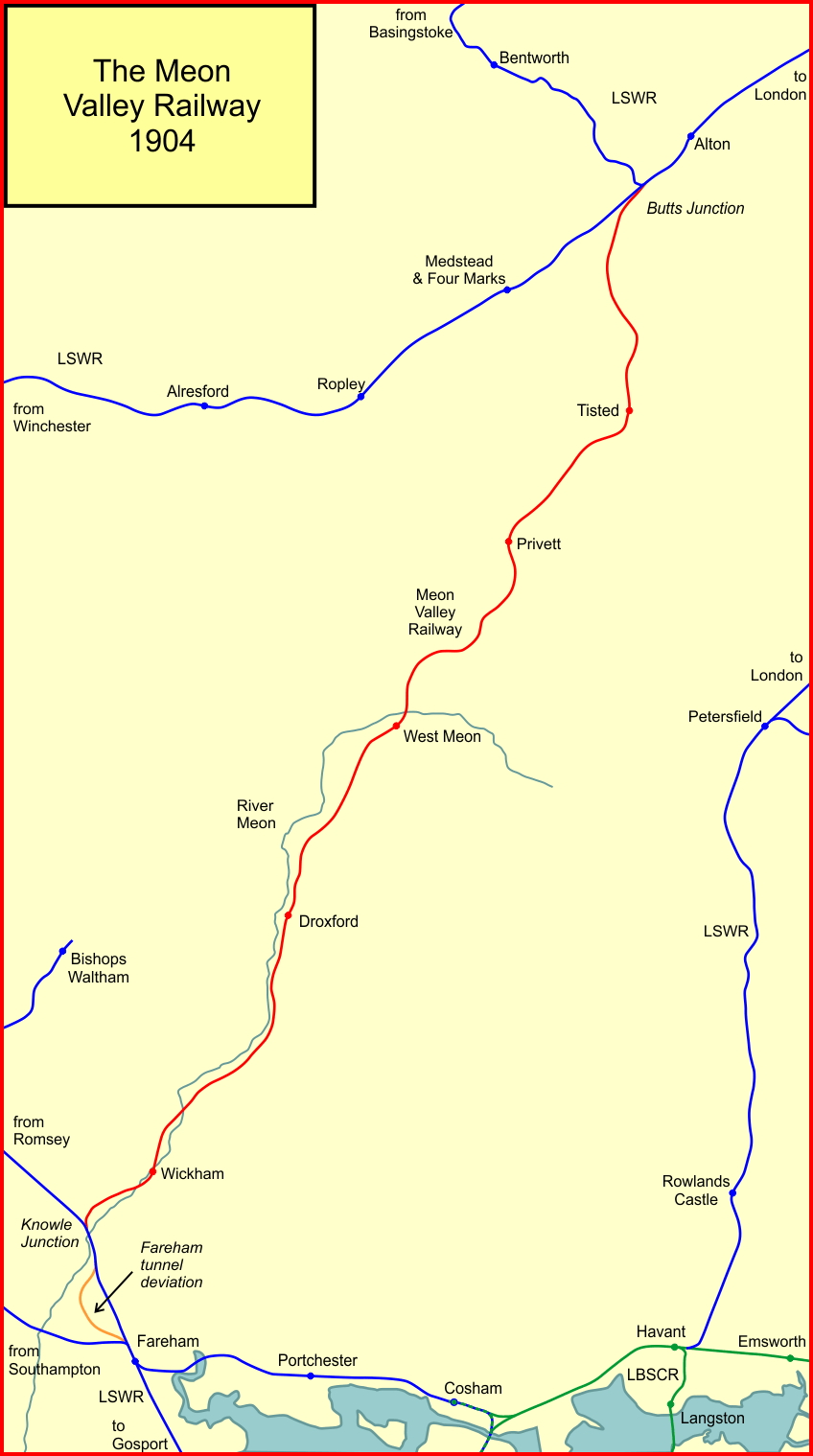
The Meon Valley Railway in 1904

By the last decade of the nineteenth century, the railway map of Great Britain was already mature, and there were few gaps waiting to be filled by speculators. In 1852 the London and South Western Railway had reached Alton, from Brookwood on the London to Southampton main line, and the Mid-Hants Railway was opened in 1865, continuing from Alton to Winchester. There were a number of proposals for railways in the Meon Valley in the middle and late 19th century; its south-westerly orientation suggested a direct line to an area west of Portsmouth, but successive schemes came to nothing.

Nevertheless in 1895 a line was promoted to connect the Great Western Railway at Basingstoke to Portsmouth, in part using the Meon Valley. The agricultural district through which it was to run was not prosperous, and the northern part of the area is rather poor for farming, but the promoters urged the idea of national defence, requiring rapid connection with Portsmouth in the event of war. The cost of the line would be £2,000,000.

The incumbent railways at Portsmouth were the London and South Western Railway and the London, Brighton and South Coast Railway (LBSCR). These companies had established main line connections between London and Portsmouth, and after a period of intense mutual hostility, had formed a working arrangement that suited them and which they did not want to have disturbed. A line that would give the Great Western Railway access to Portsmouth was greatly undesirable to them. There are conflicting reports whether the GWR actively encouraged the proposals, but in any case the parliamentary bill failed in the House of Lords on the grounds that the scheme was too costly in relation to its benefit.

Nevertheless, fearing that a modified scheme might soon be put forward by some party supporting the GWR, the LSWR responded by undertaking to connect Alton with Basingstoke and Fareham. As part of the measures to fulfil that, the Basingstoke and Alton Light Railway was built under the Light Railways Act 1896, obtaining the Basingstoke and Alton Light Railway Order 1897 and opening on 1 June 1901.

=== Authorisation of the Meon Valley Railway ===
South Western (Meon Valley) Railway Act 1897
- Act of Parliament
- Parliament of the United Kingdom
- Long title: An Act for enabling the London and South Western Railway Company to construct new Railways and to widen their Farnham Alton and Winchester Railway in the county of Southampton and for other purposes.
- Citation: 60 & 61 Vict. c. xxxv

Dates
- Royal assent: 3 June 1897

Text of statute as originally enacted

So far as the Fareham connection was concerned, the LSWR progressed a scheme for a railway down the Meon Valley; it was successful in Parliament and the South Western (Meon Valley) Railway Act 1897 (60 & 61 Vict. c. xxxv) was passed on 3 June 1897. It was to run from a junction west of Alton to another junction north of Fareham, joining the Gosport branch of the original London and Southampton Railway there.

The line was conceived as a main line, and the Directors stated that it would be designed so as to be suitable to carry express trains from London via Aldershot to Southampton, Gosport and Portsmouth.

Accordingly it would be designed with moderate curvature, but the undulating terrain made a ruling gradient of 1 in 100 unavoidable. The formation and structures would be made for double track, but only a single line would be laid, with passing loops at the stations. Long platforms, at 600-foot (183 m) capable of handling ten-coach trains, would be provided.

In anticipation of the development of a new, and busy, main line, the Farnham to Alton section of the existing LSWR network was doubled in 1901.

The line was constructed two tunnels, Privett Tunnel, 1,056 yards, and West Meon Tunnel, 539 yards, and a viaduct at West Meon, with four wrought iron lattice arches of 56 feet span. The summit of the line was 519 feet above sea level. As the emphasis was on aligning the railway as a through route, several of the stations were some distance from the settlements they were to serve. However they were well-designed by the architect T. P. Figgis with leanings towards the Arts and Crafts movement, including the provision of stained-glass door windows and tiled interiors. Relfe & Son of Plymouth were awarded the construction contract. The LSWR's engineer in charge of the works was W. R. Galbraith; Henry Byer was the resident engineer.

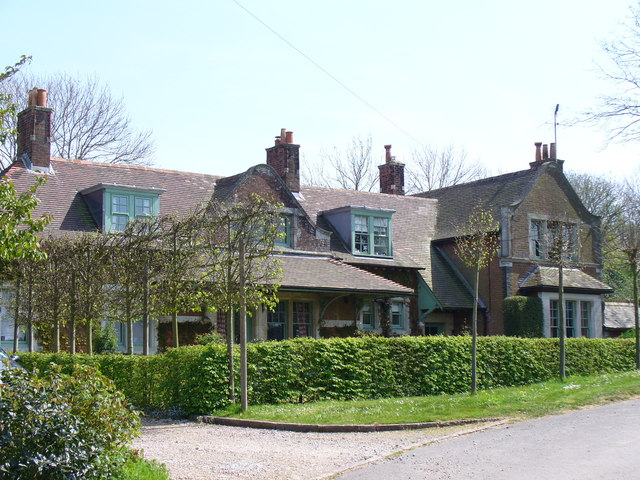
Former East Tisted station, now a private home, in a Tudor style used by MVR

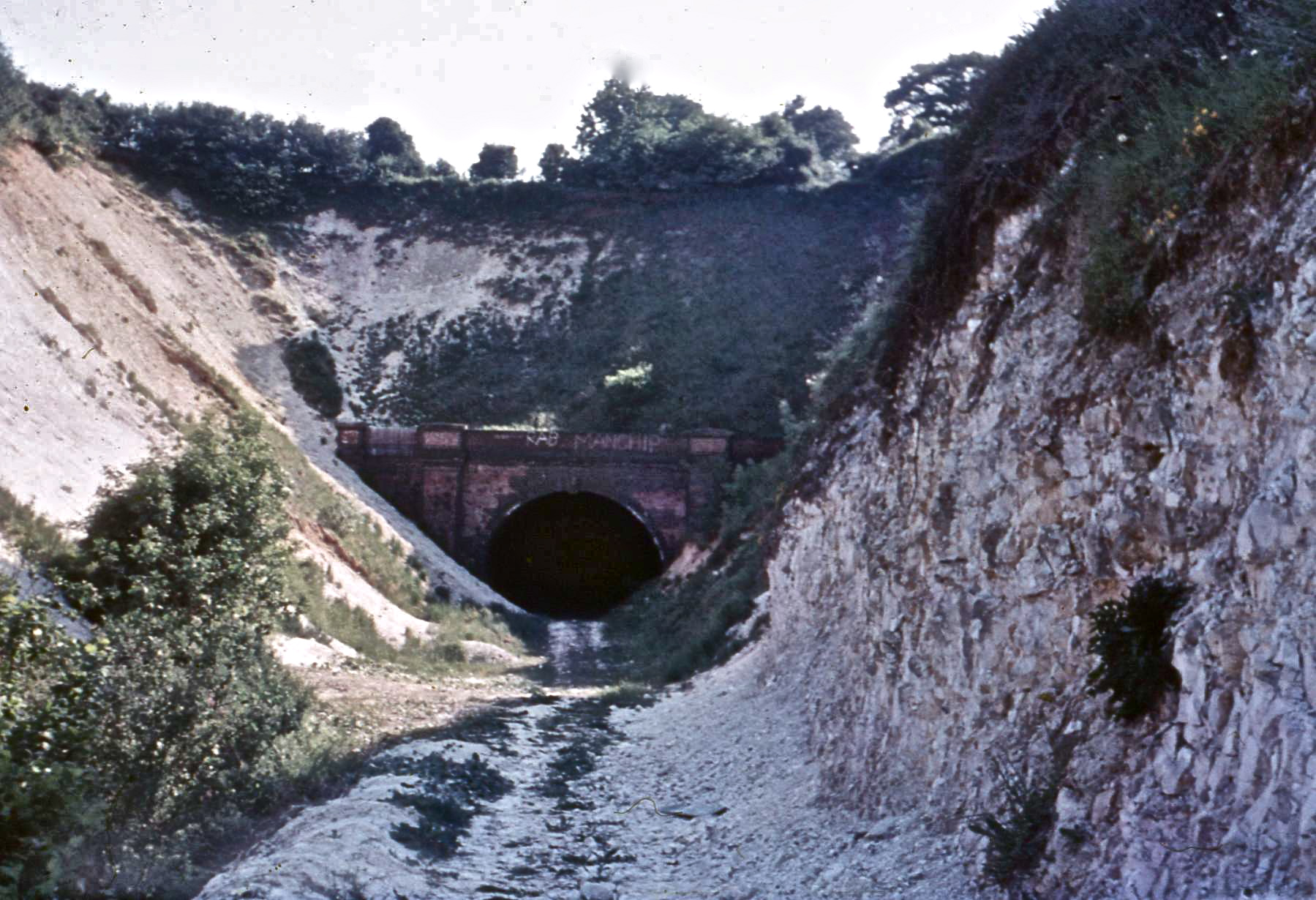
The south portal of Meon Tunnel in 1970

=== Construction and opening ===
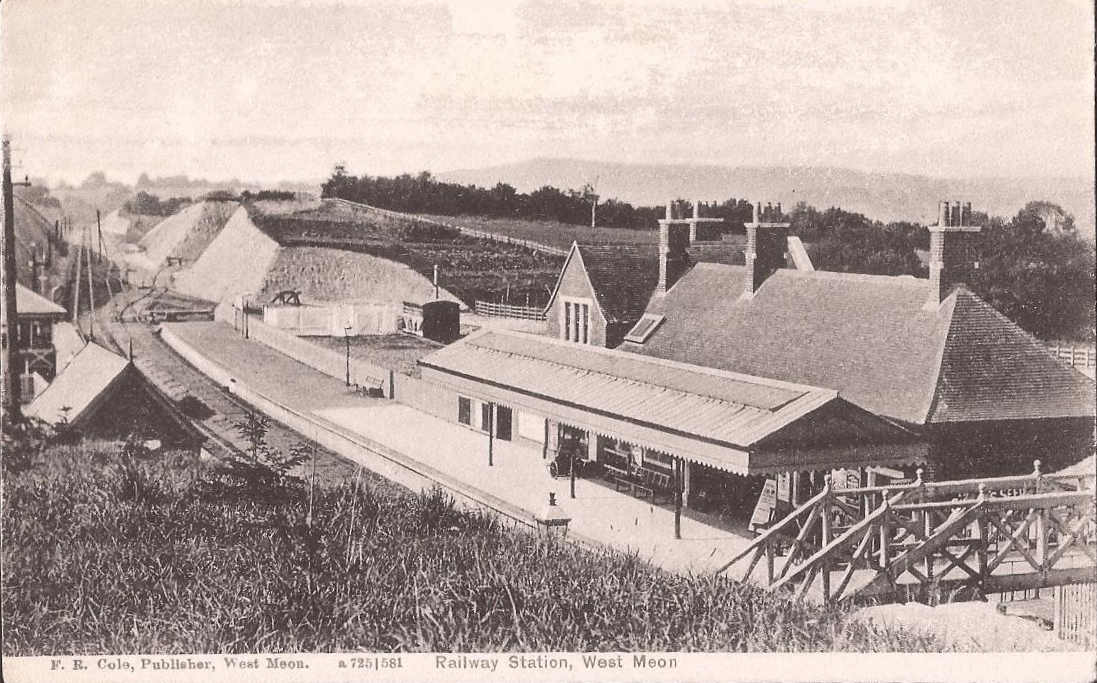
West Meon station

Construction began in 1898, with the first sod being cut just south-east of Farringdon. A problem during construction was obtaining a water supply for locomotive use, and for concreting, since the geology of the area is chalk.

The line opened for traffic on 1 June 1903. There was no public ceremony, but anyone was allowed a free one-way trip to the adjacent station. The total cost of construction, including the Fareham deviation line, was £399,500.

The West Meon viaduct shortly after construction – only the concrete piers remain

=== Early operation ===
Waterloo to Gosport through trains were mostly hauled by Adams "Jubilee" Class 0-4-2 locomotives and the Alton-Fareham only were firstly Adams 4-4-2 Radial Tanks - the engines were turned on the triangle at Gosport and at Alton a turntable was provided.

=== Knowle tunnel and junction ===
The Meon Valley line joined the original Gosport branch of the former London and Southampton Railway at Knowle Junction to reach Fareham station. That line passed through Knowle Tunnel, which had given extraordinary trouble during the earlier construction. The tunnel continued to present difficulties, and as the Meon Valley Line was intended as a first class main line, a deviation line avoiding the tunnel was in the course of construction. On 2 October 1904 the deviation was brought into use for up trains (going away from Fareham), and the line through the tunnel was singled, being used only by down trains (towards Fareham). Double track was laid on the deviation line, and from September 1906 all trains used the deviation, and the tunnel was closed temporarily while major repairs were carried out. On 2 June 1907 a single line only was opened through the tunnel to carry all up and down Meon Valley trains, and all connections at Knowle were removed. Trains to and from the Romsey direction used the deviation line and Meon Valley trains went through the tunnel.

Knowle Junction ceased to be a true junction as the original connection between the MVR and the Eastleigh to Fareham Line was removed. The MVR now used an independent single-track line through the tunnel to Fareham station. One disadvantage of this arrangement was that the section of the original line between Fareham and Knowle was only accessible from the Fareham end, so that the private sidings on it could not be easily reached from the main line. The deviation line had severe gradients which heavy up freight trains had to surmount. In 1921 the junction connections at Knowle were reinstated so that main-line trains from either direction could use the old line.

In 1907 the single track tunnel route was provided with a halt for passengers and two private sidings, serving the mental hospital at Knowle. The halt was known as Knowle Asylum Halt. It was alongside the Meon Valley single track, although the double track Romsey line was alongside, but without a platform face. The name of the halt was changed to Knowle Halt in 1942. In the 1950s it had the distinction of being illuminated by two electric lights, powered from the hospital's internal supply, when the neighbouring Botley station continued to depend on oil lamps. One of the sidings adjoined this platform; the other, which served a large brick works, was situated about half-way between Knowle and Fareham. Subsequently a third siding was added to serve an abattoir.

=== First World War ===
During the First World War the Meon Valley line was used for troop trains bound for the docks and France, but during this time the Waterloo to Gosport through services were suspended, and they were never fully restored.

=== Southern Railway ===
The LSWR was incorporated into the new Southern Railway in 1923 as part of the process known as the grouping of the railways, following the Railways Act 1921. By then passenger train services on the line had been much reduced: there were now six or eight services a day, mainly formed of two- or three-coach trains hauled by Drummond M7 tank engines, with LSWR T9 class engines remaining for faster services. Goods services remained important, with a twice-daily service pick-up train service. The junction at Alton between the Meon Valley line and the Mid-Hants line was called Butts Junction; the signal box was abolished in 1937, and subsequently the two lines up to Alton were operated as two parallel single tracks.

=== Second World War ===
During the Second World War the line was used lightly compared to other railways in the region, although there was an increase in goods traffic supplying the naval dockyard at Portsmouth. A few troop trains used the line late at night. In 1941 a special military freight train, hauled by a Drummond 700 class locomotive, was stabled for the night at Tisted, with the crew receiving instructions to stay with the engine and be ready to depart instantly in an emergency; the train was carrying 48 mines.

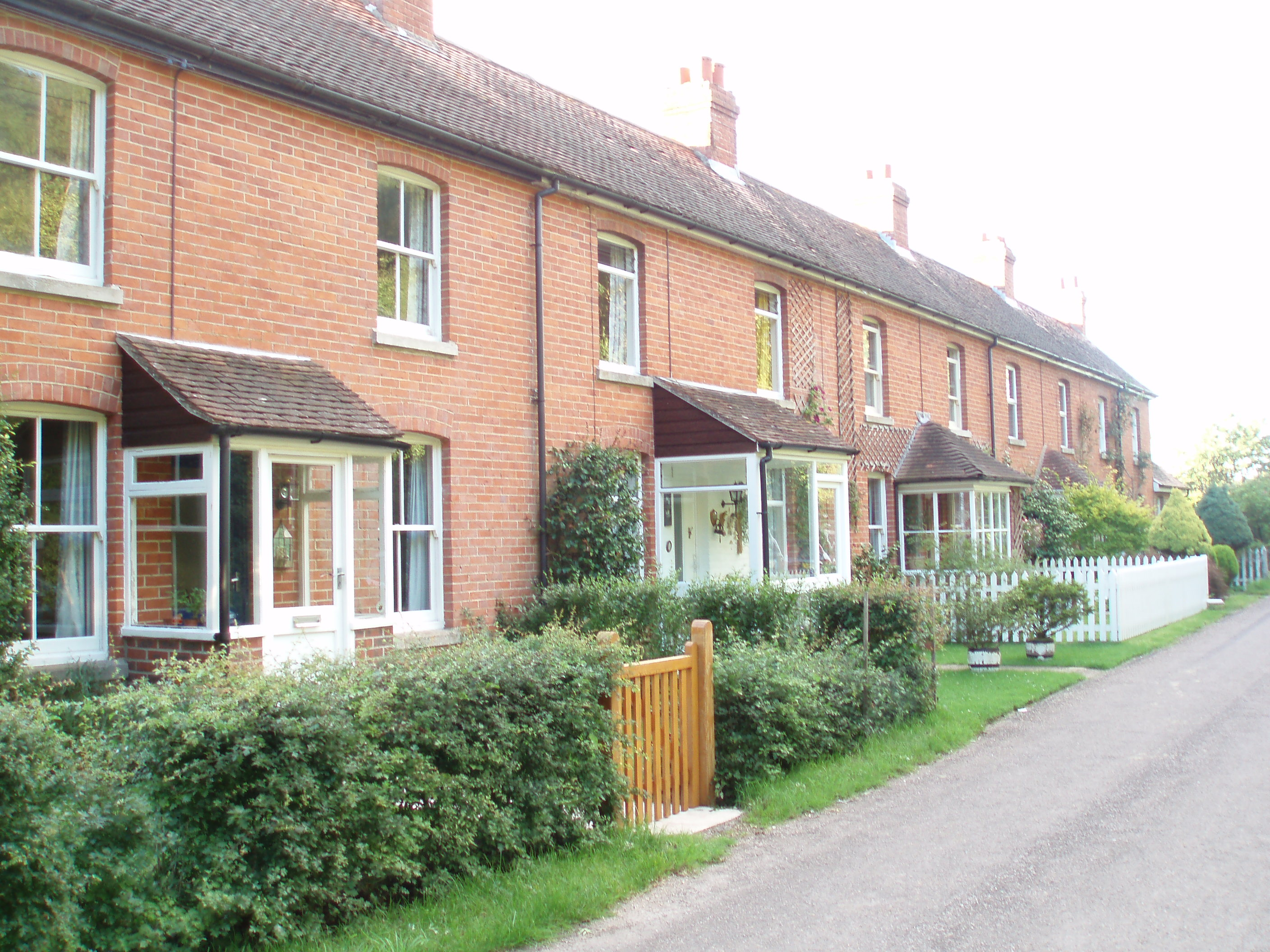
A terrace of cottages near Wickham, built for railway workers

The MVR had a brief spell of intensive use during the build-up to D-Day when huge numbers of men and equipment had to be moved to the south of England, kept in readiness and finally transported to ports. Large numbers of tanks were moved by rail to Mislingford goods yard where they were dispersed to local hard-standings for temporary storage. Mislingford was also the site of a temporary wooden platform to serve the large number of Canadian troops who were encamped in the Forest of Bere.

A final meeting took place on 2 June 1944 in connection with the Normandy landings (D-day). The British Prime Minister Winston Churchill, the Prime Ministers of Canada and South Africa, William Lyon Mackenzie King and Jan Smuts, and other Allied leaders arrived in a special train at Droxford station for a conference at the nearby HQ of U.S. General Dwight D. Eisenhower, the Supreme Allied Commander, at Southwick House. The train was formed from part of the Royal Train of the London, Midland & Scottish Railway. The station had an exceptionally long siding and was close to a deep cutting. It was considered that if threatened by an air raid, the train could be pushed into the relative safety of the cutting.

== Post-War and British Railways ==
The Southern Railway was nationalised in 1948, becoming part of British Railways. The rise of private car ownership and the major shift of local goods traffic from rail to road caused the Meon Valley line to become increasingly uneconomical to operate, and services were gradually run down. After the last timetabled service on Saturday 5 February 1955 the Meon Valley Railway closed to passenger traffic. Course comments that "There is little doubt that in 1955 the Meon Valley was unsustainable as a passenger railway." On the following day, Sunday, a special train called 'The Hampshireman', organised by a rail enthusiasts' group, ran along the full length of the line – the last train to do so. It was hauled by two T9s double-heading.

From 7 February 1955 goods services were to continue with a once-a-day service from Fareham to Droxford only, and a similar service from the northern end only from Alton to Farringdon.

The southern section to Droxford was closed completely on 30 April 1962 after the passage of an enthusiasts' railtour. The goods service to Farringdon was maintained until 5 August 1968, when the final part of the Meon Valley Railway was closed to all traffic.

== After closure ==
=== Knowle tunnel ===
From 6 May 1973 the deviation line, now only used by Romsey trains, was completely closed and partly used for the M27 motorway. British Railways had secured money for the further rebuilding and strengthening of the tunnel line, in exchange for the use of the avoiding land.

=== Sadler Vectrail ===
After the 1962 closure of the southern portion of the line, Charles Ashby purchased Droxford station and a section of line. He used it for testing a design of railbus that he had developed called the Pacerailer. This was essentially a bus-style vehicle; it used road-vehicle style pneumatic tyres on its drive wheels and flanged steel wheels at each end to guide it. As well as the MVR itself, a special steep-gradient section of track was built for testing at Droxford. A company called Sadler Vectrail Ltd was established in 1966 to re-open the Ryde to Cowes railway on the Isle of Wight using Sadler Rail Coaches and the prototype vehicle appeared briefly at an Island Industries Fair, but the scheme was unsuccessful.

Ashby also purchased an LBSCR 'Terrier' tank engine no. 32646 for £750, which he brought to Droxford in 1964, but in May 1966 this was sold to Brickwoods, the Portsmouth-based brewer, for display outside a public house on Hayling Island and it was moved, by road, for this purpose on 16 May 1966.

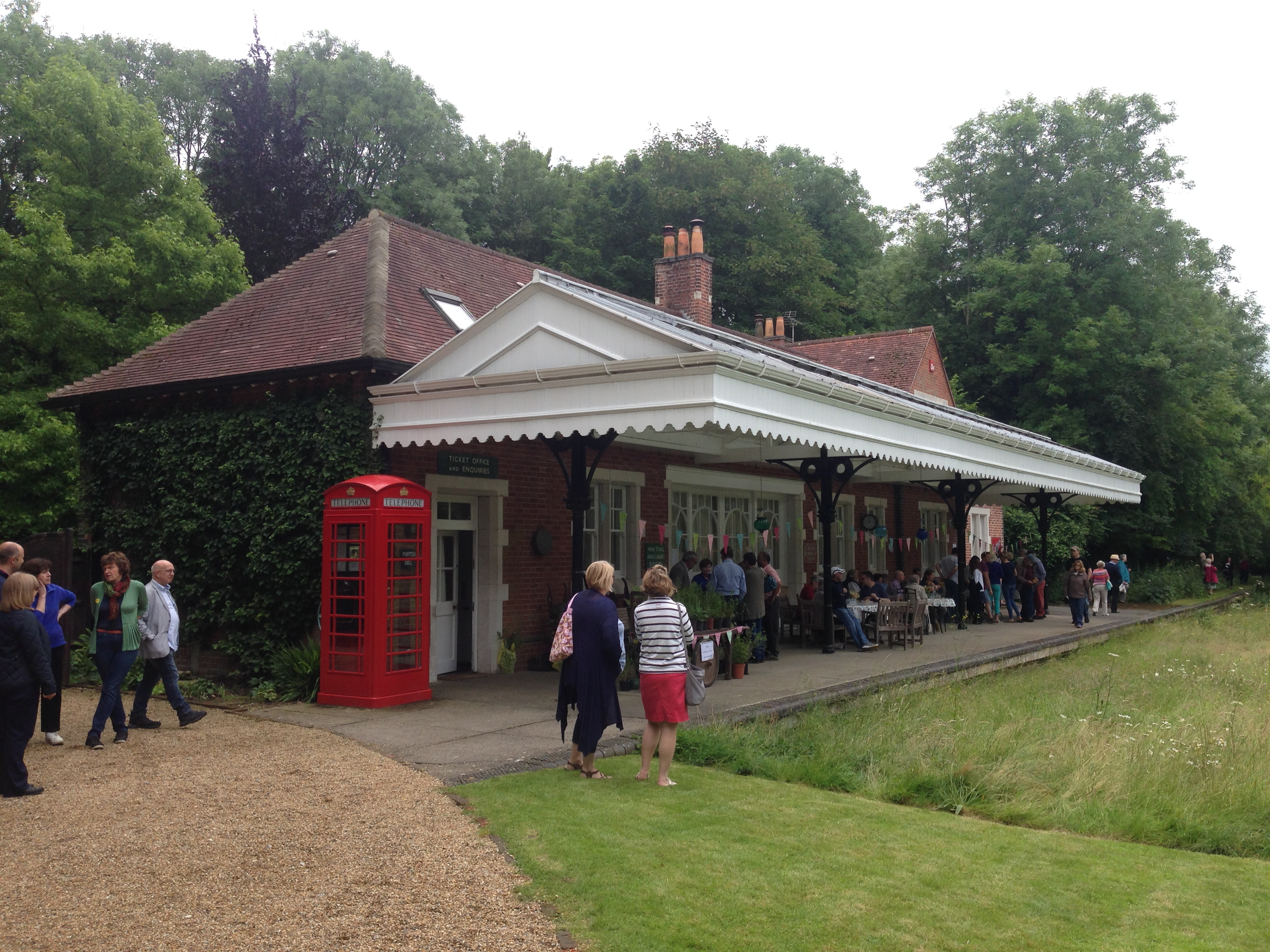
Droxford station in 2016

The southern portion of the line also became home to the Southern Locomotive Preservation Company Limited (SLP) which came to an agreement with Mr Ashby to store some of their stock at Droxford. To this end, they moved several locomotives, including 'USA' tank engine no. 30064, as well as rolling stock, to Droxford. The locomotive arrived at Knowle Junction from Salisbury on 7 January 1968. However, a fire at the site, and the fact that BR planned to sever the connection with the Eastleigh to Fareham line, meant that plans for a preserved railway came to nothing.

After the closure of Knowle Junction in 1970 the southern section of the line was cut back as far as the A32 road bridge north of Wickham. Ashby therefore had use of the line between that point and Droxford station. He used two small Ruston-Hornsby diesel shunters and two ex-BR carriages to operate private-charter trains for a short time. The last standard gauge vehicle to run on any part of the Meon Valley Railway was an Austin Mini-based railcar owned by him.

== Locations ==
- Alton; opened 28 July 1852 by LSWR; still open;
- Butts Junction; junction for the Mid-Hants Line and the Basingstoke Line;
- Farringdon; opened 15 May 1931; closed 7 February 1955;
- Tisted; opened 1 June 1903; closed 7 February 1955;
- Privett; opened 1 June 1903; closed 7 February 1955;
- West Meon; opened 1 June 1903; closed 7 February 1955;
- Droxford; opened 1 June 1903; closed 7 February 1955;
- Wickham; opened 1 June 1903; closed 7 February 1955;
- Knowle Junction;
- Fareham; London and Southampton Railway station; opened 29 November 1841; still open.

== Modern developments ==
=== Meon Valley Trail ===
During March 2014, the former railway line was cleared of all trees and shrubs as the former track bed is to be turned into an express cycle way and bridleway between Wickham and West Meon as part of a £5 million investment in a network of core cycling routes in and around the South Downs National Park.

=== Campaign for Better Transport report ===
In January 2019, Campaign for Better Transport released a report identifying the line was listed as Priority 2 for reopening. Priority 2 is for those lines which require further development or a change in circumstances (such as housing developments).

== In popular culture ==
The poem Autumn Journal by Louis MacNeice, published in 1938, includes a description of a pre-First World War journey from Hampshire to London on a cross-country train via the Meon Valley. West Meon and Tisted are mentioned as two of the stations that the poet passes through on his journey.

Shortly after the final closure of the MVR in 1968, the section of line between Alton and Farringdon was used for the filming of a television commercial for Cadbury Milk Tray chocolates. The 'action man' character jumps onto the roof of a moving train that consisted of a diesel locomotive and two carriages. Library footage at the beginning of the clip shows a third-rail electrified section elsewhere. The clip may be viewed on YouTube.
