= Alton Town Hall =

Municipal building in Alton, Hampshire, England

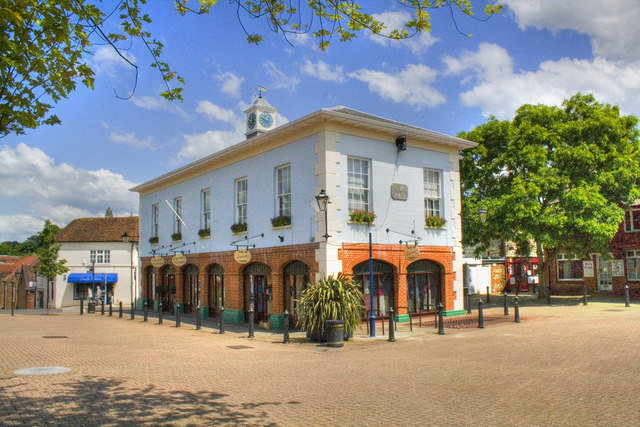
- Alton Town Hall

- Shown in Hampshire
- 51.1486°N 0.9776°W
- Location: Market Square, Alton

History
- Built: 1813

Site notes
- Architectural style: Neoclassical style

Listed Building – Grade II
- Official name: Town Hall
- Designated: 31 March 1977
- Reference no.: 1094175

Alton Town Hall is a municipal building in the Market Square in Alton, Hampshire, England. The structure, which is the meeting place of Alton Town Council, is a Grade II listed building.

== History ==
The first such structure in Alton was a medieval guildhall which dated back at least to the early 15th century. The court rolls indicate that, by the 17th century, the structures in the Market Square included a cage, stocks and whipping post.

The current building was financed by public subscription and was a reconstruction of an existing building: it was designed by in the neoclassical style, built in red brick with coloured rendering and was completed in 1813. The building, which was extended in 1840, was arcaded on the ground floor so that markets could be held, with an assembly room on the first floor. The design involved a symmetrical main frontage with six bays facing onto the west side of the Market Square: this elevation featured five sash windows on the first floor. There were quoins at the corners and a modillioned cornice at roof level.

The building became the meeting place of the local board after it was formed in 1860 and it was the venue for the trial of Frederick Baker, accused of the murder of Fanny Adams, in December 1867: Baker was found guilty and hanged outside Winchester Gaol later that month. After significant population growth, partly due to its status as a market town, the area became an urban district with the town hall as its headquarters in 1894. A fire station was established on the ground floor in the early 1920s.

The town hall continued to serve as the offices and meeting place of the urban district council but ceased to be the local seat of government when the council acquired an early 18th century residential property in the High Street and converted it for municipal use in 1934. The council also established a new purpose-built fire station on an adjacent site at the corner with Cross and Pillory Lane at the same time. Concerts and other events that were held to raise funds for the Wings for Victory Week during the Second World War. (Note: An illuminated certificate in the town hall commemorates the fund raising efforts.) Following local government reorganisation in 1974, the town hall became the offices and meeting place of Alton Town Council; an extensive programme of refurbishment works, which involved the conversion of the ground floor into retail units, was completed in 1987. A square wooden cupola, with clock and weather vane, was subsequently installed on the roof to recognise the work of Ewart Ings, the last town clerk of the urban district council.
