= Alton, Hampshire =

Market town in Hampshire, England

Coordinates: 51°08′59″N 0°58′37″W

Alton
- Town
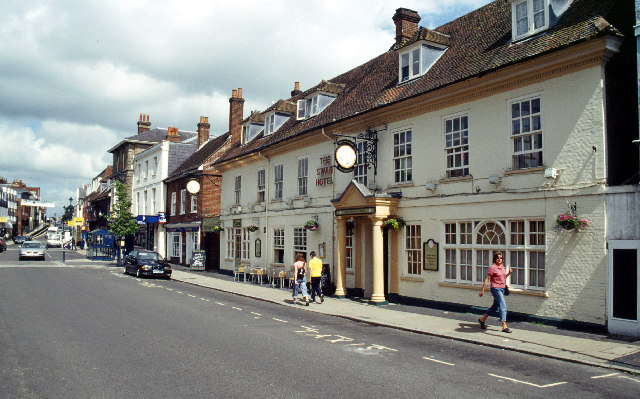
- Alton, looking north east along the High Street

- Location within Hampshire
- Population: 17,880 (2021 Census)
- OS grid reference: SU716394
- Civil parish: Alton
- District: East Hampshire
- Shire county: Hampshire
- Region: South East
- Country: England
- Sovereign state: United Kingdom
- Post town: ALTON
- Postcode district: GU34
- Dialling code: 01420
- Police: Hampshire and Isle of Wight
- Fire: Hampshire and Isle of Wight
- Ambulance: South Central
- UK Parliament: East Hampshire

Alton (/ˈɔːltən/ AWL-tən) is a market town and civil parish in East Hampshire, England, near the source of the northern branch of the River Wey. It is on the A31 road 8.5 miles (13.7 km) southeast of Farnham and 16 miles (26 km) northwest of Winchester.

It was an important market town: it was recorded in the 11th-century Domesday Book as having the most valuable market in England. There have been multiple historic battles in Alton, in 1001 and during the English Civil War in 1643. Alton was the site of the treaty in which Robert Curthose recognised Henry I as the King of England.

The town had an urban district council until 1974, when a civil parish was established, creating Alton Town Council. The town had a population of 17,880 at the 2021 census.

The town has connections with Sweet Fanny Adams, who was famously murdered in 1867, and Georgian novelist Jane Austen.

== History ==
=== Toponymy ===
The River Wey has a source in the town, and the name Alton comes from an Anglo-Saxon word "aewielltun" meaning "farmstead at the source of the river". Alton was recorded in the Domesday Survey of 1086 as Aoltone. During the Saxon period Alton was known as Aweltun.

=== Early history ===
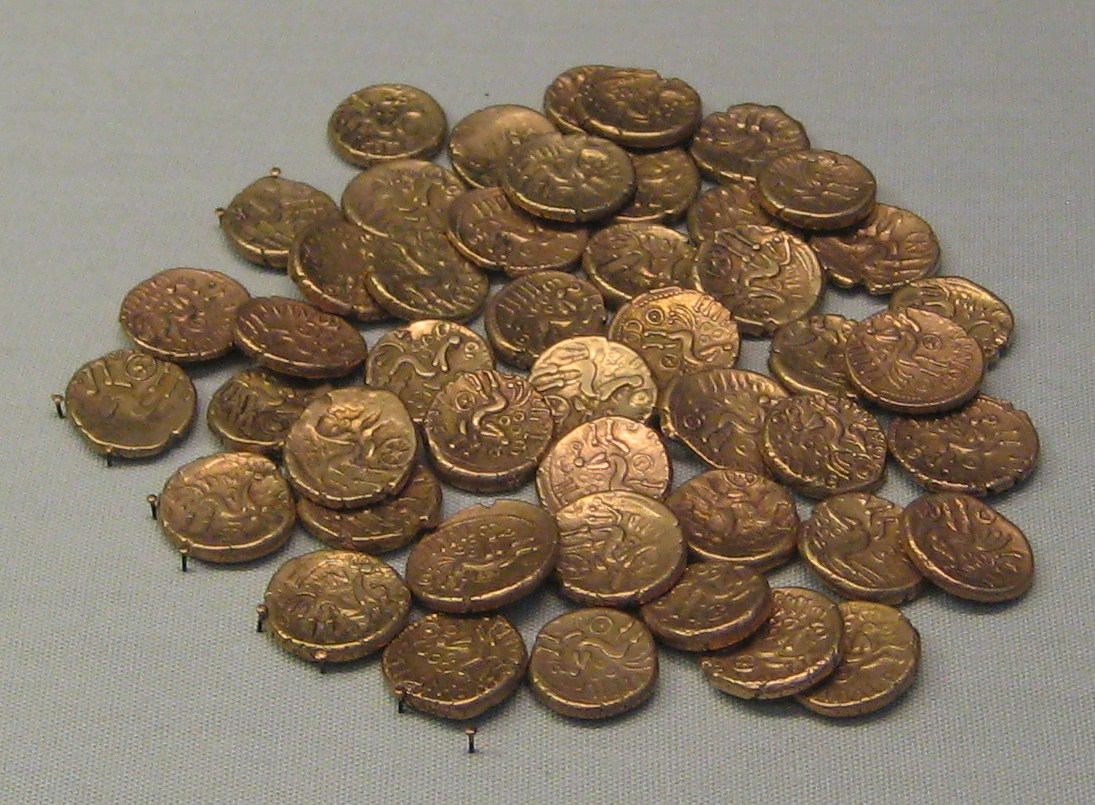
Coins from the Alton Hoard, 1st century AD

The Alton Hoard of Iron Age coins and jewellery found in the vicinity of the town in 1996 is now in the British Museum. There is evidence of a Roman posting station at Neatham near Alton, probably called Vindomis, and a ford across the River Wey on the line of a Roman road that ran from Chichester to Silchester. An Anglo-Saxon settlement was established in the area and a 7th-century cemetery was discovered during building excavations. It contained grave goods including the Alton Buckle which is on display in the Curtis Museum and considered to be the finest piece of Anglo-Saxon craftsmanship found in Hampshire. The buckle, found in the grave of a warrior, has a silver-gilt body set with garnets and glass.

In 1001 Danish forces invaded England and during the First Battle of Alton the forces of Wessex came together and fought against them. About 81 Englishmen were killed, including Ethelwerd the King's high-steward, Leofric of Whitchurch, Leofwin the King's high-steward, Wulfhere a bishop's thane, and Godwin of Worthy, Bishop Elfsy's son. The Danes were the victors although Danish casualties were higher and fleeing Englishmen took refuge in Winchester.

Alton (as Aoltone in the 'Odingeton Hundred — Hantescire') is recorded as having the most valuable market in the Domesday Book. There were 13 households and was in the Hundred of Neatham.

The Treaty of Alton was signed in 1101 between William the Conqueror's eldest son Robert II of Normandy and his brother Henry I of England. Henry had seized the throne while his elder brother was away on the First Crusade. Robert returned to claim the throne, landing in Portsmouth. The brothers met in Alton and agreed terms which formed the Treaty of Alton. Part of the main street through Alton is called Normandy Street, probably reflecting this event.

=== Middle Ages ===
The first recorded market in Alton was in 1232, although the market at Neatham first recorded in the Domesday Book may also have been in the town. Blome wrote in 1673 of a 'market on Saturdays, which is very great for provisions, where also are sold good store of living cattle'. The Saturday market is featured on Kitchin's map of Hampshire (1751) which marks the town as Alton Mt. Sat.

1307 was, in fact, the first year of Edward II's reign but Edmund of Woodstock was not lord of the manor then. According to the Victoria County History (written after Curtis' book):-

In 1273 Edward I granted the manor [of Alton Westbrook] to his mother, Queen Eleanor, who died in 1291, when it reverted to the Crown and was granted in 1299 as dower to his second wife, Margaret of France. On the death of Queen Margaret in 1317, it again came to the Crown, and Edward II gave it in 1319 to his brother Edmund of Woodstock, Earl of Kent.

As can be seen, Queen Margaret held the manor until 1317 and so the fair could not have been granted to Edmund of Woodstock in 1307.

The correct date for the grant seems to be 22 November 1320 (according to the Charter Rolls, 14 Edward II, no.15). The grant was for a 9-day fair – the vigil [eve] and feast of Whitsuntide and seven days after.

The two main manors in Alton – Alton Eastbrook and Alton Westbrook – had a fair each. That of Alton Eastbrook has no extant charter, and may never have had one. It was originally held on St Lawrence's Day and so its origin was, presumably, the patronal festival. The religious aspect would have ceased when the country was no longer Roman Catholic. This fair seems to have been held on Crown Close (which is in the manor of Alton Eastbrook) in the early 19th century. When this land was built upon, the fair moved and was held where ever the Westbrook fair was – the Market Place, various meadows and the Butts.

The date of the Eastbrook fair was changed to Michaelmas in the mid-18th century as it came during harvest time and the farmers were not satisfied. Some accounts for this fair in the early 18th century do survive and show that there was a cheese fair as well the usual mix of travelling and local people with stalls and stands – people selling lace, gloves, books, gingerbread, bodices, sugar plums, toys, soap and knives, to name but a few. By the late 19th century, this fair was said to be mainly for horses, sheep and, occasionally, hops. Alton still has an annual fair, but it now takes the form of a carnival.

=== Modern period ===
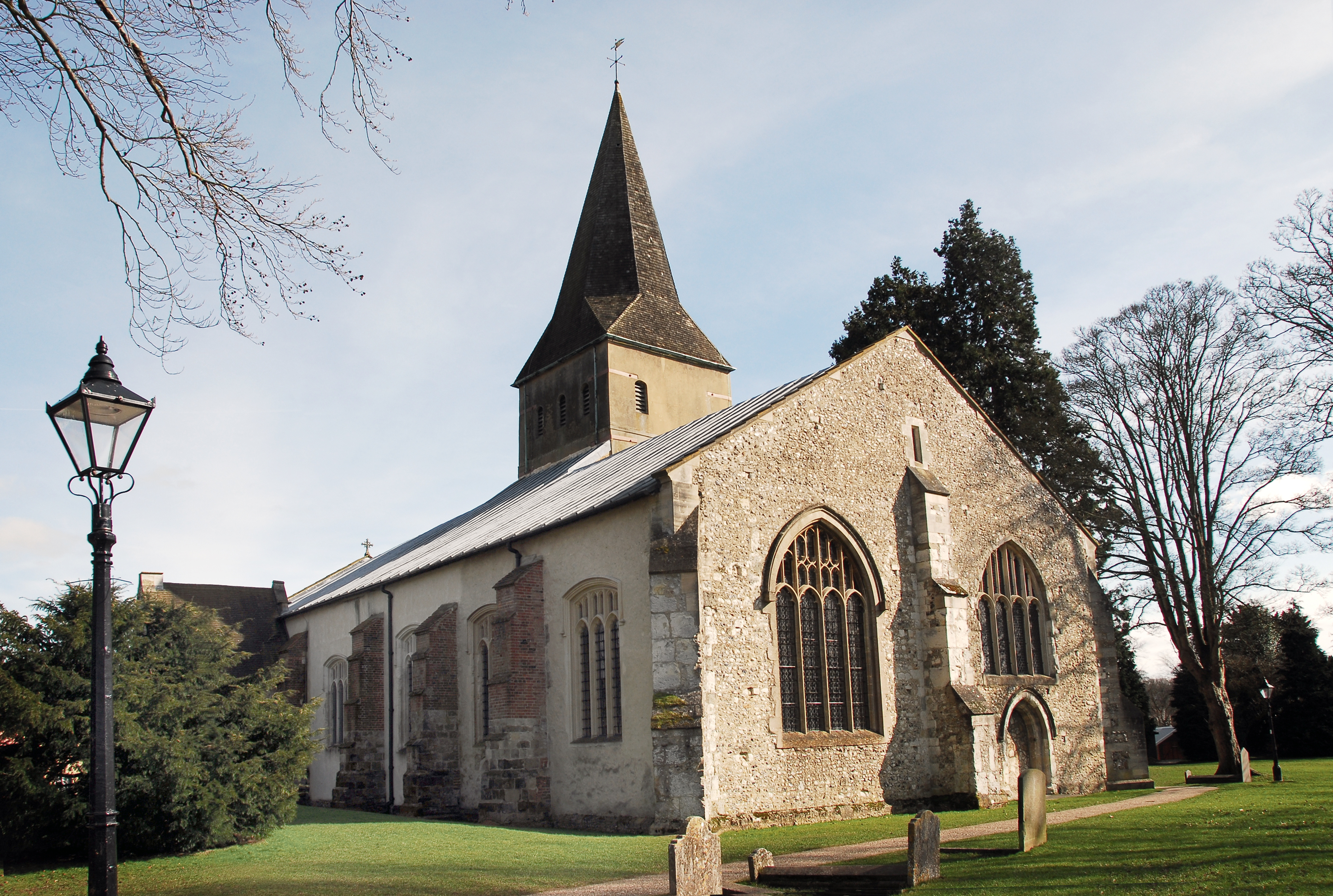
Church of St Lawrence. During the battle, many Parliamentary troops forced their way in through the west door (right), now walled up.

A battle was fought in Alton during the English Civil War. A small Royalist force was quartered in the town when on 13 December 1643 they were surprised by a Parliamentary army of around 5,000 men. The Royalist cavalry fled, leaving Sir Richard Bolle (or Boles) and his infantry to fight. Outnumbered, the Royalists were forced into the Church of St Lawrence, where Bolle was killed along with many of his men. Over 700 Royalist soldiers were captured and bullet holes from the battle are still visible in the church today.

In 1665, Alton suffered an outbreak of bubonic plague, but soon recovered. On Saturday, 24 August 1867, an eight-year-old girl, Fanny Adams, was murdered in Alton. Her assailant, Frederick Baker, a local solicitor's clerk, was one of the last criminals to be executed in Winchester. As was the custom of the time, the initial inquest for the death of Fanny Adams took place shortly after the body was found and took place at the Duke's Head public house (now "The George") on 27 August 1867. Frederick Baker was further remanded awaiting his trial on 29 August 1867 at Alton Town Hall. Fanny Adams' grave can still be seen in Alton cemetery. The brutal murder, so the story goes, coincided with the introduction of tinned meat in the Royal Navy, and the sailors who did not like the new food said the tins contained the remains of "Sweet Fanny Adams" or "Sweet F.A." The expression "sweet fanny adams" has an old-fashioned slang meaning of nothing.

== Governance ==
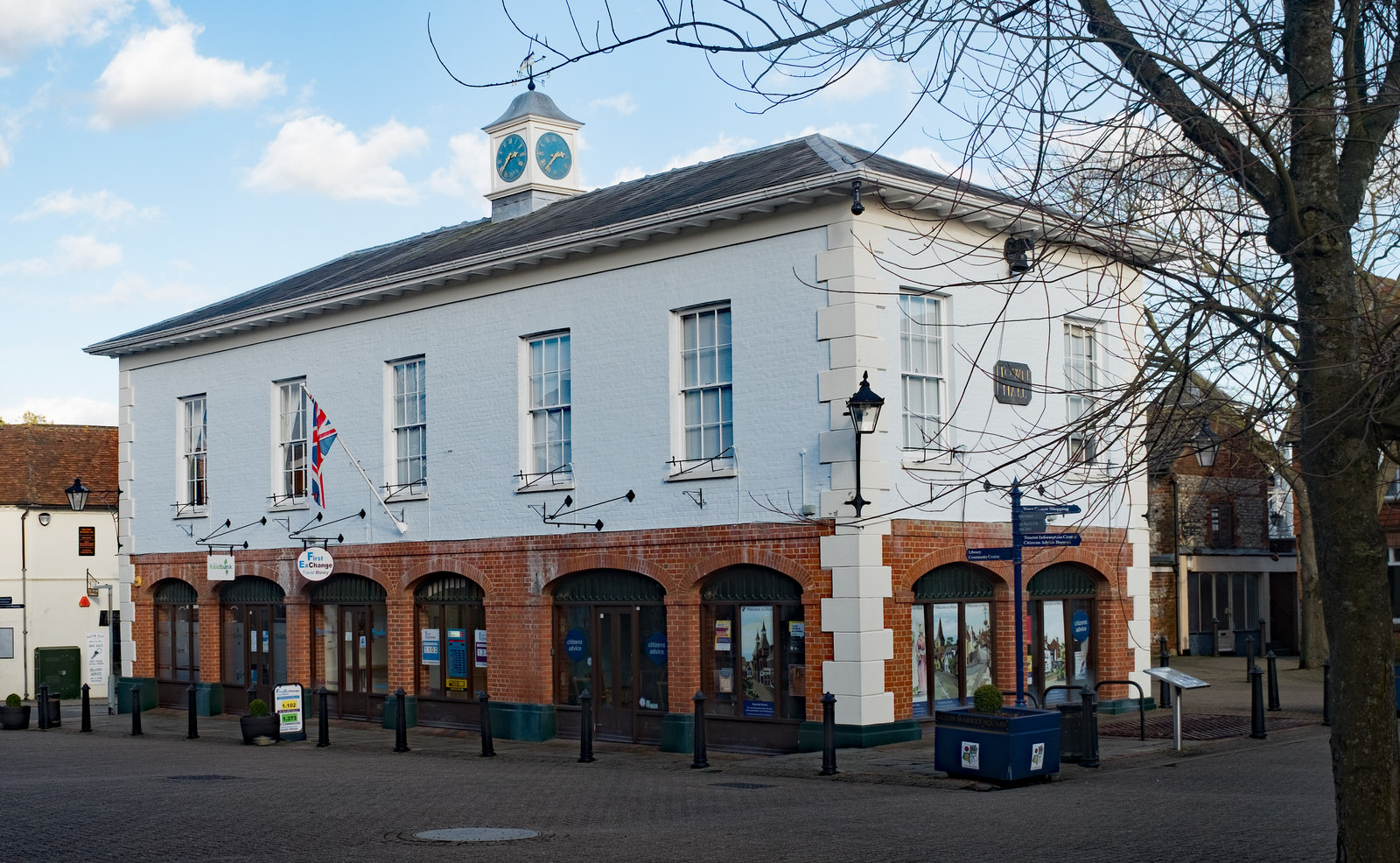
Alton Town Hall

Prior to the Local Government Act 1972, Alton had fallen under the aegis of the (now defunct) Alton Urban District Council. The Act resulted in the dissolution of this body, and the establishment (on 1 April 1974) of the current Alton Town Council. The responsibilities of the Alton Urban District Council were divided between the new Alton Town Council, the Hampshire County Council and the newly formed East Hampshire District Council. The Council meets at Alton Town Hall, in Market Square.

== Geography ==
Alton is located at the eastern end of the Hampshire Downs, a belt of chalk overlooking the Weald. The town is bordered to the east by Wealden Grassland. Nearby Brockham Hill, situated 3.5 miles (5.6 kilometres) northeast of Alton, rises to 225 metres (738 feet) above sea level.

Alton is between Farnham 9 miles (14 km) to the northeast and Winchester 16 miles (26 km) to the southwest. London is 52 miles (84 km).

Alton is a small built-up area according to the ONS built-up area classification.

=== Climate ===
Along with the rest of South East England, Alton has a temperate climate which is generally warmer than the rest of the country. The annual mean temperature is approximately 9 °C (48.2 °F) and shows a seasonal and a diurnal variation. January is the coldest month with mean minimum temperatures between 0.5 and 2 °C (32.9 and 35.6 °F). June and July are the warmest months in the area with average daily maximum around 21 °C (69.8 °F).

== Economy ==
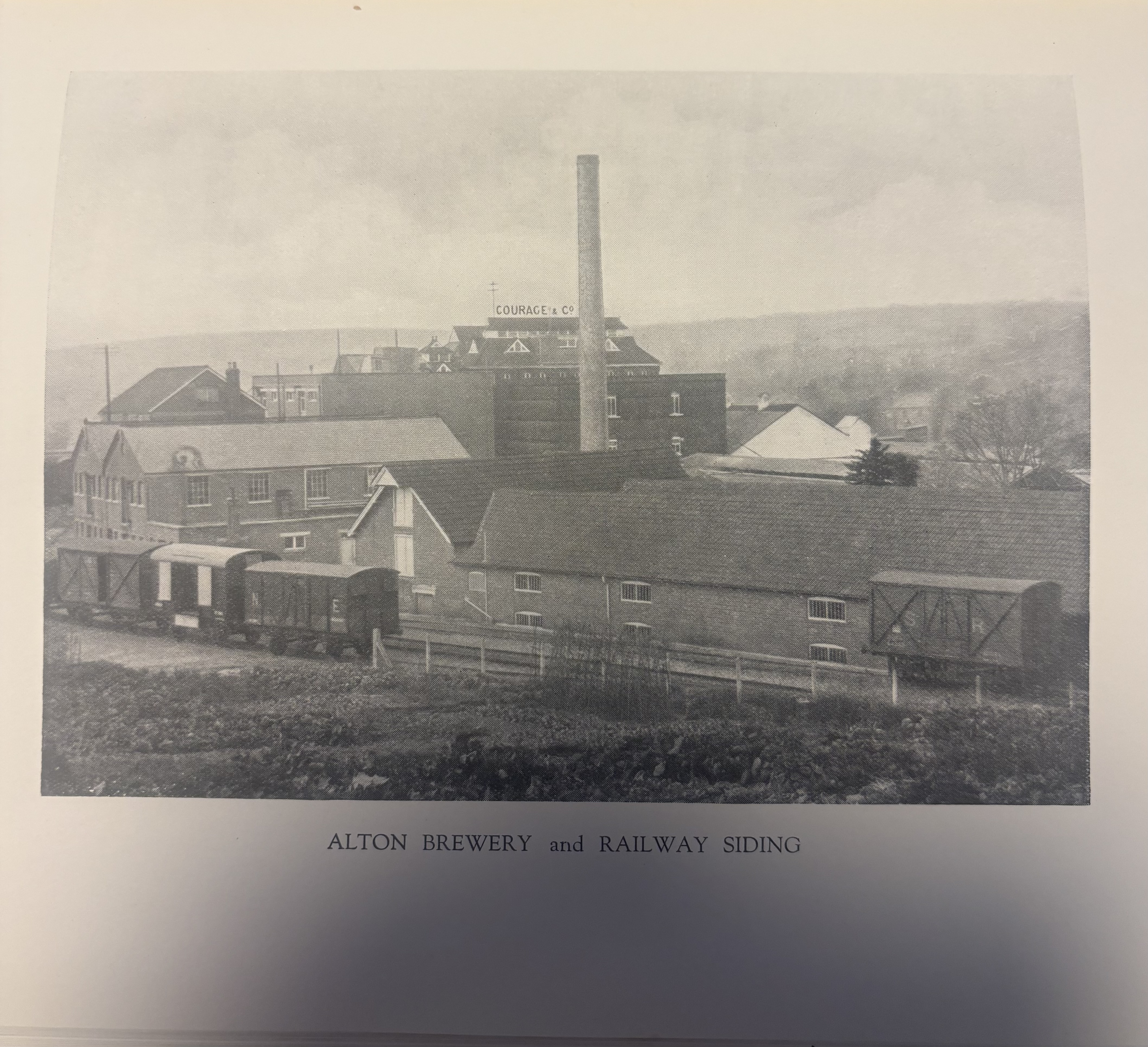
Courage's Alton Brewery and railway siding c.1930s

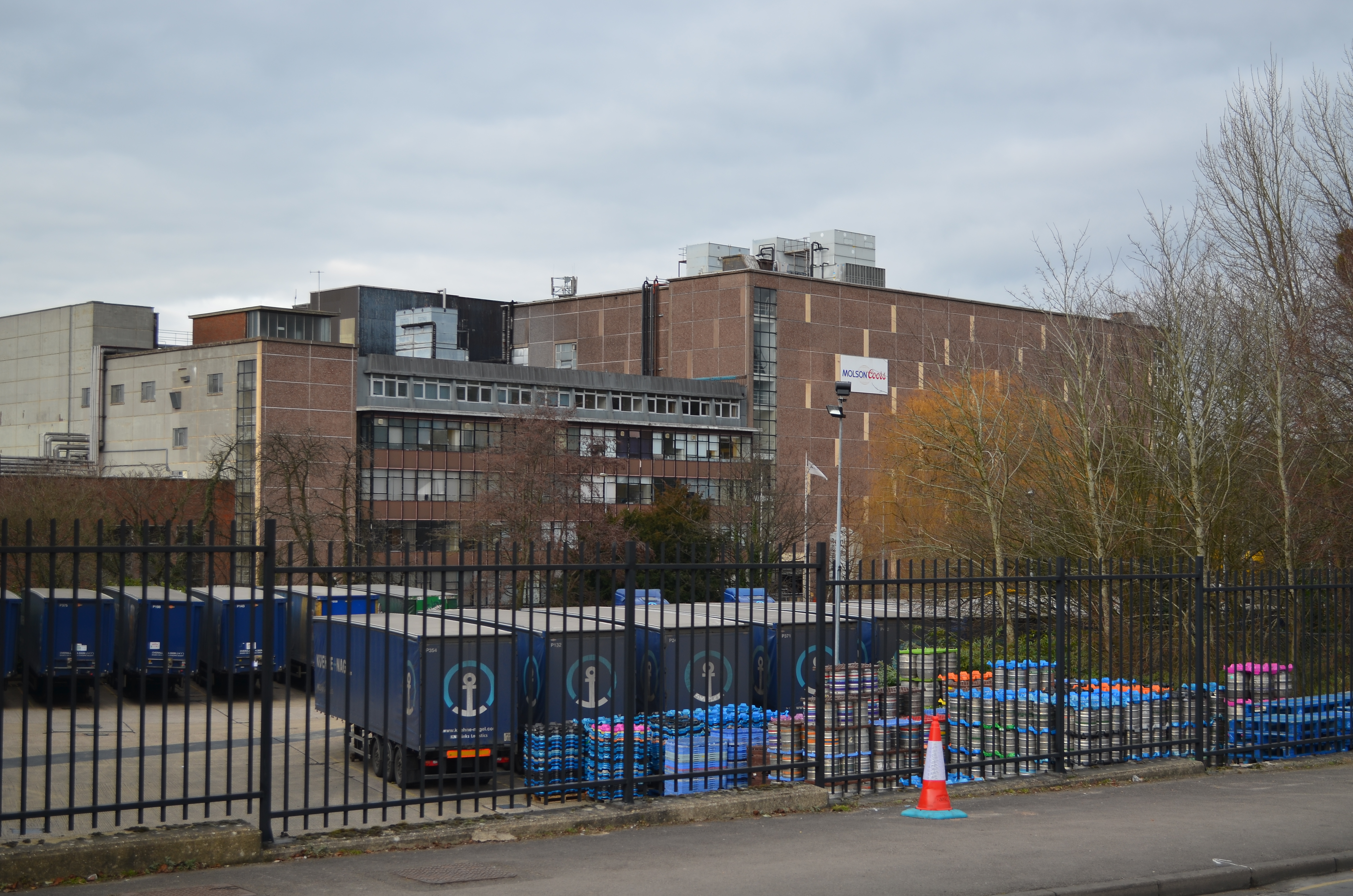
Coors brewery in Alton, which closed in 2015

There have been a number of breweries in Alton since 1763, with Hall & Co. and Crowley & Co. establishing large brewery operations in Turk Street in the 1800s. As the brewing industry consolidated in the c.20th, these breweries were acquired by Courage Ltd and Watney, Combe Reid & Co. Ltd. A further brewery was opened nearby in Manor Park in December 1962 to produce Harp Lager as part of a consortium involving Guinness, Courage and a number of other partners. Watney, Combe Reid & Co. Ltd closed its brewery in 1970 and it became a depot until the 1980s. The original Courage site and Manor Park was sold to Bass Brewers in 1979 who closed the original brewery in 1980 to replace it with a warehouse and kegging facility. Following further mergers and sales within the brewing industry, Coors Brewing Company acquired the Manor Park brewery in 2001. The brewery produced Carling, Grolsch and Worthington until it was closed in 2015 due to a decline of demand for beer and a loss of a third party contract.

Alton was significant in the 18th century for the manufacture of paper and of dress materials including ribbed druggets, shallons, silks and serges, bombazine and figured barragons.

Alton has businesses in the retail and service sectors in the centre of the town, and over a hundred businesses in the four industrial areas of Mill Lane, Newman Lane, Caker Stream and Omega Park, ranging from light industrial to computer software production. Clarcor, TNT N.V. and Poseidon Diving Systems all have businesses in Alton's Industrial Site, Mill Lane.

One of Alton's largest commercial employers is the financial services sector. Lumbry Park, which used to be known as Lumbry Farm, is on the B3006 Alton to Selborne road, and was occupied by Inter Group Insurance Services (IGIS), a subsidiary of the Royal Bank of Scotland. Inter Group employs over 170 people on this site, and specialises in travel insurance. The company operated in Alton since 1999, was acquired by Churchill Insurance in 2001, becoming part of RBS Insurance division in 2003 as part of an RBS takeover. However, on 11 November 2008, Inter Group announced its proposal to close its office in Alton in August 2009 due to "changes in the travel insurance market", leading to the loss of 104 full-time staff and around 16 part-time.

Alton has a range of chain stores and independent shops including greengrocers, butchers and a hardware shop. There are five main supermarkets that serve the town.

Alton's employment rate was 59.8% in 2021. The largest industry of the town's residents was health and social work activities, followed by wholesale and retail trade.

== Demographics ==
The Alton built-up area had a population of 17,880 as of the 2021 Census. Its median age was 44. 90% of residents were born in the UK.

Households by accommodation type, Alton
House type	No. households	%
Whole house or bungalow: Detached	1,785	21.8
Whole house or bungalow: Semi-detached	2,400	29.3
Whole house or bungalow: Terraced	1,775	21.7
Flat, maisonette or apartment	2,220	27.1
A caravan or other mobile or temporary structure	[c]	[c]

Households by tenure, Alton
Tenure type	No. households	%
Owned: owns outright	2,835	35.9
Owned: owns with a mortgage or loan or shared ownership	2,355	29.8
Rented: social rented	1,550	19.6
Private rented or lives rent free	1,165	14.7

== Culture ==
Jane Austen Regency Week is a celebration of the time the author Jane Austen spent in Alton and Chawton and is held in June each year.

The Allen Gallery serves as Alton's art gallery. It houses a large, permanent ceramics collection as well as temporary exhibitions.

Holybourne Theatre is on the site of a former Nissen hut that was converted into a theatre by German prisoners-of-war during World War II. Plays have been performed there since 1950, but the official opening was not until 1971.

Alton Morris was formed in 1979, and have been Morris dancing both in the United Kingdom and abroad. They often perform at Alton street events.

Local choirs include Alton Amateur Operatic and Dramatic Society, established in 1921, who perform two musical shows and one play each year in a wide variety of musical and dramatic styles. Alton Community Choir sings unaccompanied Hampshire folk songs as well as some African, gospel, blues and calypso music.

A new Alton Arts Festival took place over 10 days in July 2024 and continues to date.

Between 1840 and 2013, the Alton Agricultural Show (also known as the Alton Show) took place on an annual basis, organised by the North East Hampshire Agricultural Association, to advance "agricultural knowledge in this part of Hampshire" and "to improve and benefit the labourers in agriculture", and was one of the oldest agricultural shows in the country. The Association was founded at a meeting of local farmers held on 25th February 1840 at Alton Town Hall. Edward Knight of Chawton House, the nephew of Jane Austen was in the chair and was elected at the meeting as the first president of the Association a position he held for 39 years. Initial shows were held on The Butts, but moved to Anstey Park in 1906, continuing as an annual event until the outbreak of World War I in 1914. Post-war, the show was revived for 1919 at Chawton Park, returning to Anstey Park in 1920. The show continued until 1923 when it was suspended due to losses, although ploughing matches continued from 1936. After interruptions to revival plans due to World War II, the show recommenced in 1944 and continued to be an annual evet from that point forward, taking place on the August Bank Holiday. In 1986, the show moved to a new site at Froyle Park and was held on the third Saturday in July, before moving to the third Sunday in July in 1992, and later to the second Sunday in July.. In 1991, the Alton Horse Show (founded in 1894, also by a member of the Knight family) became a separate event at the Alton Show, the same year that the local paper; The Alton Herald started to organise a Motor Show, providing moving and static displays of vintage and modern motor vehicles. The show was cancelled in 2001 due to the Foot and Mouth outbreak. In 2004, the Alton Show and the Alton Horse Show became integrated, sharing insurance, health and safety and staffing costs due to rocketing costs. After cancellations for 2014 due to lack of volunteers and 2015 due to difficulties with the landowners, the Alton Show was cancelled for good in 2016 due to the sale of the site used for the show by the Treloar Trust, and the association being unable to identify a suitable alternative. North East Hampshire Agricultural Association was dissolved and its assets were passed on to the Alresford and District Agricultural Society. According to news reports at the time, the Society were to name a cattle class after the Association and the cup for the winner of that class would be one formerly awarded at the Alton Show.

== Notable landmarks ==
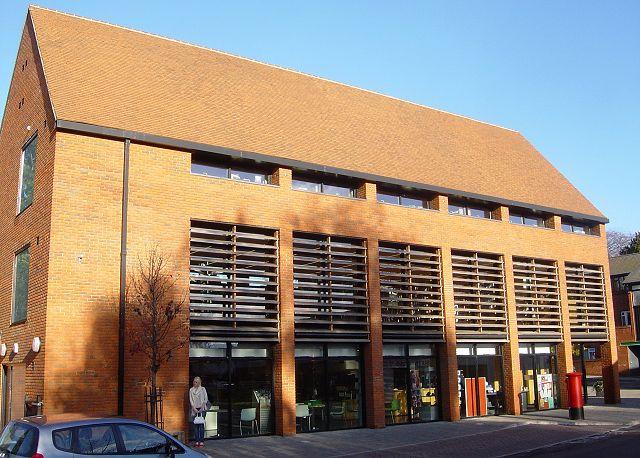
Alton Library, Vicarage Hill

The Alton Independent Cinema Project was formed in May 2011 to help secure the future of independent cinema in the town.

Alton Maltings was renovated in 2004–2005 and is now the home of Harvest Church and is used by community groups, charities, private users and other organisations throughout the week. The Alton Maltings claims to be the widest wooden spanned building in Hampshire.

Alton Library was rebuilt in 2005 to a design by the County Council Architects. The new library contains a lending library, reference library, computer facilities and a cafe.

Alton Sports Centre is open to the public and includes a swimming pool, gym, indoor and outdoor courts.

The Curtis Museum was founded in 1856 by Dr William Curtis, who was born in Alton, and houses a local history collection.

The Town Gardens contains a bandstand (built in 1935 for the silver jubilee of King George V), a children's playground, flower beds, trees and shrubs (4.5 acres (18,000 m^{2})). The bandstand was replaced in 2013 to commemorate Elizabeth II's Diamond Jubilee.

Anstey Park, is a large open space with playing fields and a small children's playground (32 acres (130,000 m^{2})); the park is home to the town's rugby club.

== Sports ==
Alton F.C., nicknamed the Brewers, play in 9th tier of English Football in the Combined Counties Football League Premier Division South as of the 2024/25 season.

The town is also home to Alton RFC, which was formed on 8 April 1926, after an October 1924 meeting at which a group, including Harlequins F.C. player Tommy Rose who was a well known World War I pilot, resolved that rugby would be the recognised winter game of the district. The first official rugby match played by Alton and District Rugby Football Club (as it was then known) was against The Electrical & Wireless School of RAF Flowerdown on 14 April 1926. Alton lost 27-3. The team celebrated their centenary with a match against RAF Odiham (who stepped in to provide opposition as RAF Flowerdown no longer exists and the unit it was replaced by has no rugby team) on 18 April 2026. Alton RFC won Counties 4 Hampshire in the 2024/2025 season, giving them promotion to Counties 3 Hampshire for the next season. Former Red Rose and Rugby World Cup silver medallist (2002 and 2006), Vanessa Huxford previously played for Alton RFC.

Alton Cricket Club, also nicknamed the Brewers, play in the Premier Division of the Southern Premier Cricket League. The club play their home games at Jubilee Playing Fields having moved there from Anstey Park in the early 1980s.

The Municipal Ground (also known as previously as the Alton Recreation and Sports Ground) and latterly at different times as the Courage Ground and Bass Sports Ground, was another sports ground in the town. Hampshire played one first-class match at the ground, against the touring South Africans in 1904. The ground was home to Courage (Alton) Cricket Club (later renamed Bass (Alton) Cricket Club) and Courage & Company (Alton) FC (later Bass (Alton) FC. Bass (Alton) Cricket Club folded in the 1990s. Bass (Alton) FC merged with Alton Town FC who then played their home games at the ground until 2015 when the ground was sold by the owners, Coors for redevelopment into housing for £6.7 million. The old site of the Municipal Ground is now occupied by housing and apartment blocks on a road called Goswell Square with access through Murray Grove. The ground was also home to a tennis club and a bowls club.

== Education ==
Alton lies approximately midway between the University of Winchester and the University of Surrey at Guildford but its nearest University campus is the University for the Creative Arts in Farnham. It is home to Treloar's, an independent educational establishment founded in 1907 by Sir William Purdie Treloar, Lord Mayor of London, to provide education for young people with physical disabilities. Treloar's now runs Treloar School and College, a provision of education for pupils aged from 2–25 with physical and learning difficulties in Holybourne.

The state secondary schools in Alton are Eggar's School (formerly the Grammar School), and Amery Hill School. Eggar's School was founded in 1642 by John Eggar of Moungomeries as the Free Grammar School. It later became known as Eggar's School. It occupied a site in Anstey Road until it moved to a new site in Holybourne in 1968. In 2012 the school converted to academy status, as a means to secure existing standards and to further develop the school.

Sixth-form education is provided by Alton College, which has gained outstanding inspection reports from Ofsted.

Until 2024, there was an independent Catholic day school, Alton School (formerly Alton Convent School), which educated boys and girls from 6 months to 18 years old. The school was closed due to a 'continued decline in pupil numbers' and a ‘combination of adverse political and economic factors’.

== Transport ==
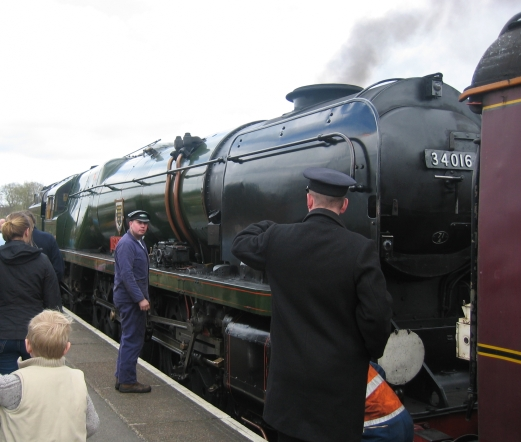
Watercress Line

Alton station is on the National Rail network at the end of the Alton line with a service to London Waterloo.

Alton railway station is the terminus for the Watercress Line, formerly the Mid Hants Railway, a restored steam railway running between Alton and New Alresford, so called because it used to be used to transport fresh watercress to London. The Watercress Line is now a charity largely operated by volunteers, and best known for its events such as Steam Illuminations, War on the Line and Day Out With Thomas featuring Thomas the Tank Engine.

The origins of the Watercress Line date back to 1861, the year in which Parliament granted consent for what was then known as the 'Alton, Alresford and Winchester Railway'. Four years later the Mid Hants Railway opened, and the train service continued until the line was closed in 1973. Then in 1977 the line was partially re-opened, in 1983 it was extended further, and in 1985 it was re-opened as far as Alton to connect with the mainline London service.

Alton was previously the site of a railway junction at Butts Junction. As well as the Mid-Hants Railway, from 1903 to 1955 the Meon Valley Railway ran from Alton down the Meon Valley to join the Eastleigh to Fareham line at Fareham. The Basingstoke & Alton Light Railway ran north to Basingstoke.

Buses in Alton are operated by Stagecoach South. These buses include, 64 to Winchester (via Four Marks, Ropley, Bishop’s Sutton, New Alresford and Science Centre), 65 to Guildford (via Bentley and Farnham), 13 to Basingstoke or Whitehill (this route is via Alton, it goes to Kingsley if going towards Whitehill or Odiham and Hook if going towards Basingstoke) and 38 to Petersfield (via Chawton, Selborne, Greatham and Liss). There are also buses operated by Cresta to local villages, and service 9 which goes around Alton.

== Notable people ==
- Adam de Gurdon (died 1305), son of a bailiff of Alton; English knight who rebelled against King Henry III, fought in single combat against the future King Edward I
- William de Alton (c. 1330 – 1400), Dominican friar, writer and theological philosopher during Edward II's reign, became famous for asserting that the Virgin Mary was polluted with original sin
- Edmund Spenser (1552–1599), the Elizabethan poet and contemporary of William Shakespeare, may have lived in a now well-preserved Tudor cottage at 1 Amery Street in about 1590. A plaque on the house states that he "lived some time in these parts".
- John Pitts, biographical author, born in Alton in 1560
- John Goodyer (1592–1664), botanist born in Alton
- John Murray (1741–1815), born in Alton, a pioneering minister of the Universalist church in the United States.
- William Curtis (1746–1799), botanist, was born in Alton and served his apprenticeship as an apothecary before devoting the rest of his life to the study of British plants.
- Jane Austen (1775–1817), Georgian novelist, lived in Chawton just outside Alton from 1809 until her death, and wrote or revised six novels there.
- Elijah Waring (1787–1857), Anglo-Welsh writer born in Alton, who founded an English-language periodical in Swansea, Wales
- James Winter Scott (1799–1873), British Whig politician who lived in Alton
- Cardinal Newman (1801–1890), English Catholic, lived in Alton from 1816 to 1819.
- Philip Crowley (1837–1900), English naturalist and entomologist specialising in Lepidoptera, born in Alton
- Alexander William Bickerton (1842–1929), professor of chemistry in New Zealand, born in Alton
- Arthur Romney Green (1872–1945), English craftsman and furniture designer born in Alton
- William Curtis Green (1875–1960), architect, designer and barrister born in Alton
- Dorothy Darnell (1876–1953), artist from Scotland, founder of the Jane Austen Society in Alton, died at home in Brook Cottage, Lenten Street, Alton
- Ernest George Horlock (1885–1917), born in Alton, English recipient of the Victoria Cross for gallantry in the First World War
- Malcolm Nokes (1897–1986), British schoolteacher, soldier, research scientist and Olympic athlete who died in Alton
- Lieutenant General Sir William Gregory Huddleston Pike (1905–1993), senior British Army officer, Vice Chief of the Imperial General Staff, died in Alton
- George Rumbold (1911–1995), English professional footballer born in Alton
- Jean Bird (1912 - 1957) First Woman to get RAF wings lived in Alton
- Percy Andrews (1922–1985), English footballer born in Alton
- James William 'Jimmy' Dickinson (1925–1982 in Alton), an English football player
- Cecil Andrews (1930–1986), English footballer born in Alton
- David Hughes (1930–2005), British novelist born in Alton
- John Martin (born 1942), Australian cricketer born in Alton
- Dave Lawson (born 1945, in Alton), English keyboardist and composer, member of UK 70s progressive rock band Greenslade
- Maggie Holland (born 1949), English singer and songwriter born in Alton
- Spike Stent (born 1965), English record producer and mixing engineer born in Alton
- Alison Goldfrapp (born 1966), singer in Goldfrapp who went to school in Alton
- Yvette Cooper (born 1969), Labour Party Politician went to school at Eggar's School and Alton College
- Samantha Warriner (born 1971), retired triathlete, born in Alton, who represented New Zealand
- Russell Howard (born 1980), comedian best known for Russell Howard's Good News, studied at Alton
- Chris Wright (born 1985) professional cricketer with Essex, Warwickshire and Leicestershire studied at Eggar's School in Alton

== Twin towns ==
Alton is twinned with:

- Pertuis, Vaucluse, Provence-Alpes-Côte d'Azur, France
- Montecchio Maggiore, Vicenza, Veneto, Italy

== See also ==
- List of places of worship in East Hampshire
