= Local prison =

Category of prison in the United Kingdom

In His Majesty's Prison Service, a local prison is a type of prison where a person is detained before a trial or directly after a conviction.

As of 2012, operational local prisons in England and Wales for male prisoners are:

- Altcourse
- Bedford
- Birmingham
- Bristol
- Chelmsford
- Doncaster
- Dorchester
- Exeter
- HM Prison Forest Bank
- Gloucester
- High Down
- HM Prison Holme House
- Hull
- HM Prison Latchmere House
- Leeds
- Leicester
- Lewes
- Leyhill
- Lincoln
- Liverpool
- Nottingham
- Parc
- Pentonville
- Preston
- Shrewsbury
- Wandsworth
- Winchester
- Wormwood Scrubs
- HM Prison Wymott.

As of 2012, operational local prisons in England and Wales for female prisoners are:

- Bronzefield
- Eastwood Park
- Foston Hall
- Holloway
- New Hall.
