= HM Prison Bristol =

Prison in Bristol, England

HMP Bristol
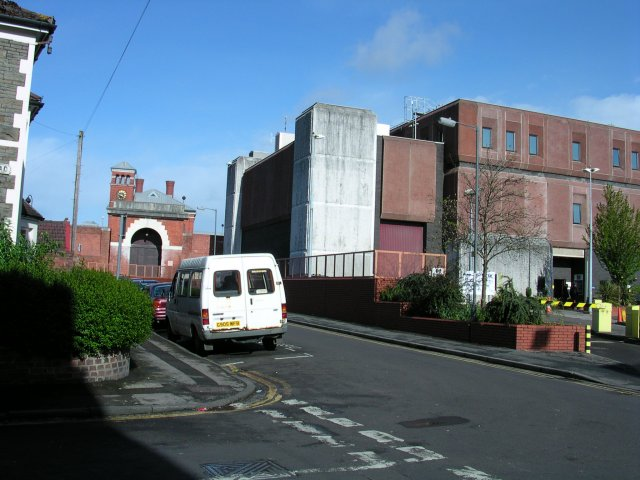
- Horfield Prison, Bristol

- Location in Bristol
- Location: Bristol, England; 51°28′51″N 2°35′32″W
- Security class: Adult Male/Category B
- Population: 580 (June 2025)
- Governor: Amanda Corrigan

HMP Bristol (previously known as Horfield Prison) is a Category B men's local prison, located in the Horfield area of Bristol. The prison is operated by His Majesty's Prison Service.

== Early history ==
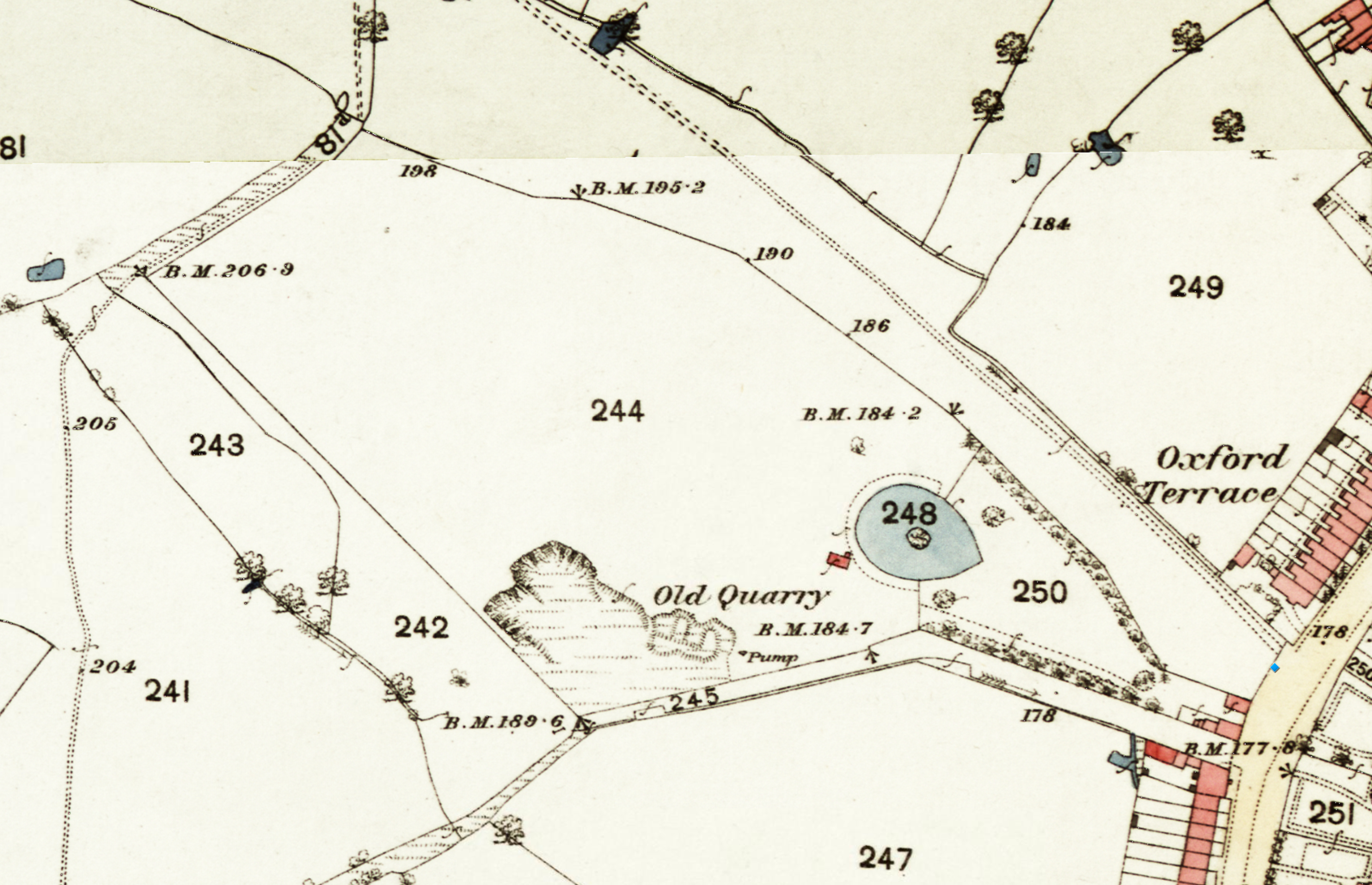
Site of the prison c.1870: field 244 (including quarry) and pleasure garden 248 and 250 (25" OS map)

Horfield Prison was built in 1883 to replace the New Gaol (built 1820). The Corporation had previously bought a pleasure garden in Horfield, and the field behind it with the intention of building a new prison there. When it was discovered that the Central Government intended to take over the building and maintaining of prisons, the city council left it to the State. The new prison was opened in February 1883.

At its foundation the prison had 160 cells, typically housing about 179 prisoners.

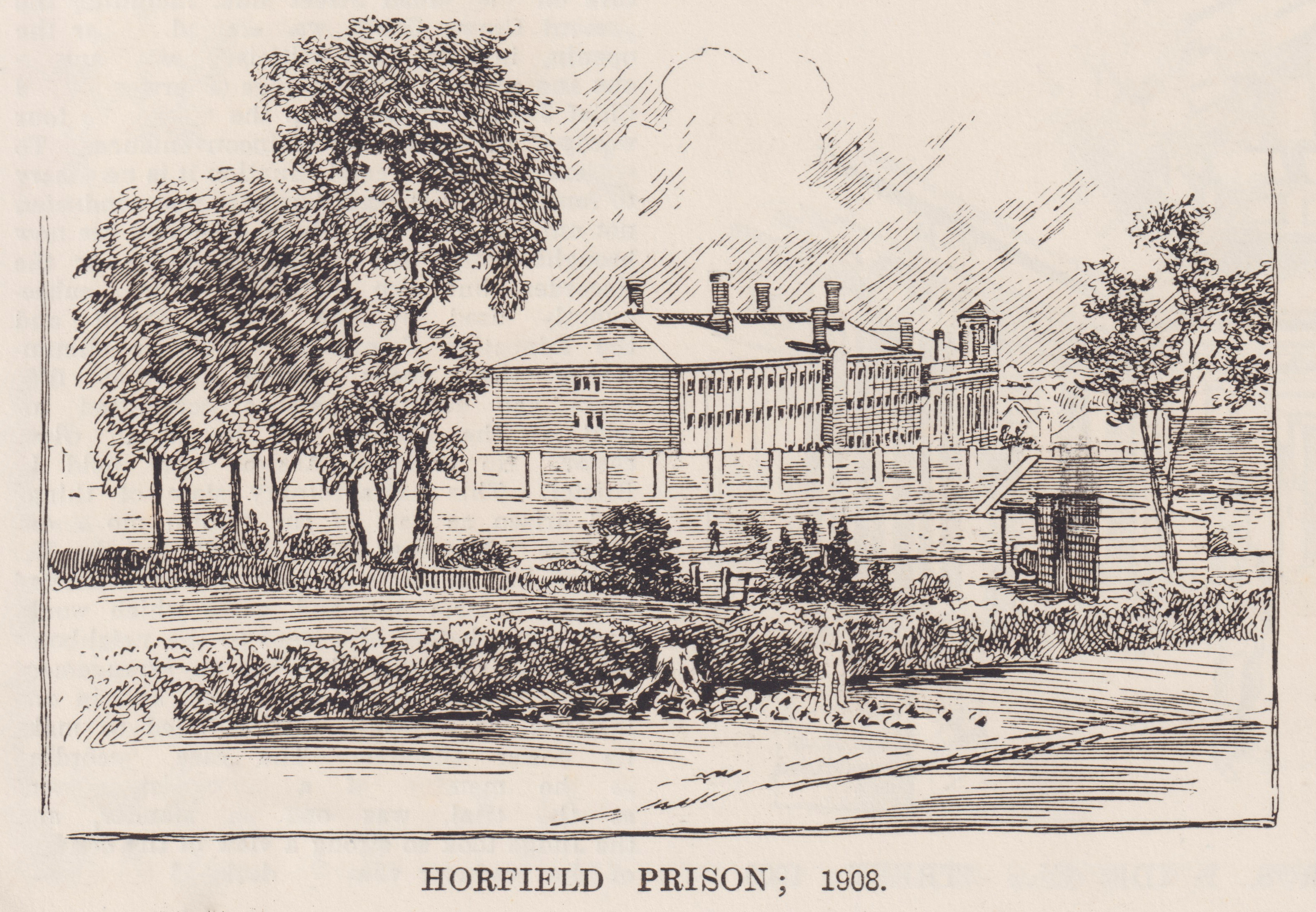
Horfield Prison, 1908

Horfield Prison's history includes fourteen executions. The first of these took place on 11 March 1889: a man called Withy, hanged for murder. The last execution took place on 17 December 1963 when Russell Pascoe was hanged for the murder of William Rowe during a robbery. His accomplice Dennis Whitty met the same fate at HMP Winchester on the same morning.

== Post-war development ==
In 1953 the first Pre-release Hostel in the country was opened in the prison grounds. The initiative was widely publicised and documented photographically.

In 1967 the prison was expanded with the opening of 'B' wing, increasing cell accommodation to 320. A further wing was later added, with additional construction in the 1990s.

There were riots at HMP Bristol in 1986 and 1991. Major internal damage was caused to prison wings on both occasions.

The prison aroused controversy in 1996 when it was revealed that prisoners were sometimes transported to and from Bristol by a stretched limousine. Officials claimed the limo was only used when commercial taxis were not big enough to handle multiple prisoner transfers with prison officers as security. Soon after Bristol was upgraded to a Category A prison (part of the high security estate) holding the most dangerous prisoners.

== 21st century ==
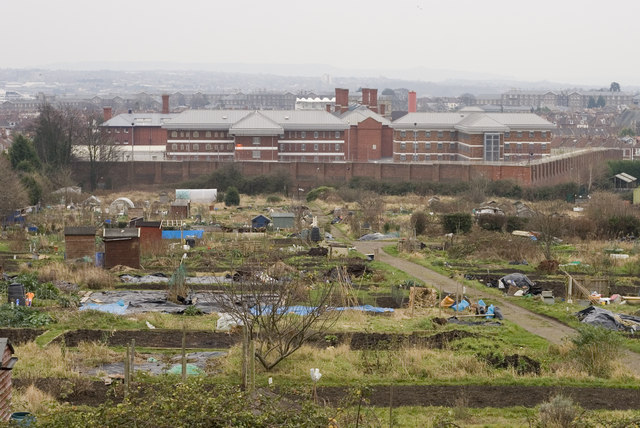
The rear of the prison viewed from neighbouring allotments in 2007

A report from the Board of Visitors in 2000 criticised Bristol Prison for keeping some remand inmates on a punishment regime in segregation. Bristol faced more criticism in 2002 when it emerged that a shortage of staff nurses had resulted in the prison paying out thousands of pounds for agency nursing staff. A year later, Bristol was downgraded back to a Category B local prison, after repeated overcrowding and safety concerns from nearby residents.

Bristol Prison came in for more criticism in 2005 after a report by Her Majesty's Chief Inspector of Prisons cited inconsistent management, poor safety, and negative race relations at the prison. A year later officers at the prison reported rising levels of violence due to widespread use of heroin, crack cocaine and cannabis among inmates.

An Independent Monitoring Board report published in 2011 stated that HMP Bristol had an annual budget of £14.2 million. This report identified issues with prisoners clothing and equipment as well as the provision of hygiene facilities. It also highlighted improvements on the previous year with respect to resettlement services and visits. The overall judgement of this report was "significant and continued improvement."

== Archives ==
Records of Horfield Prison are held at Bristol Archives (Ref. 41405) (online catalogue). Other records are held at the National Archives.

== The prison today ==
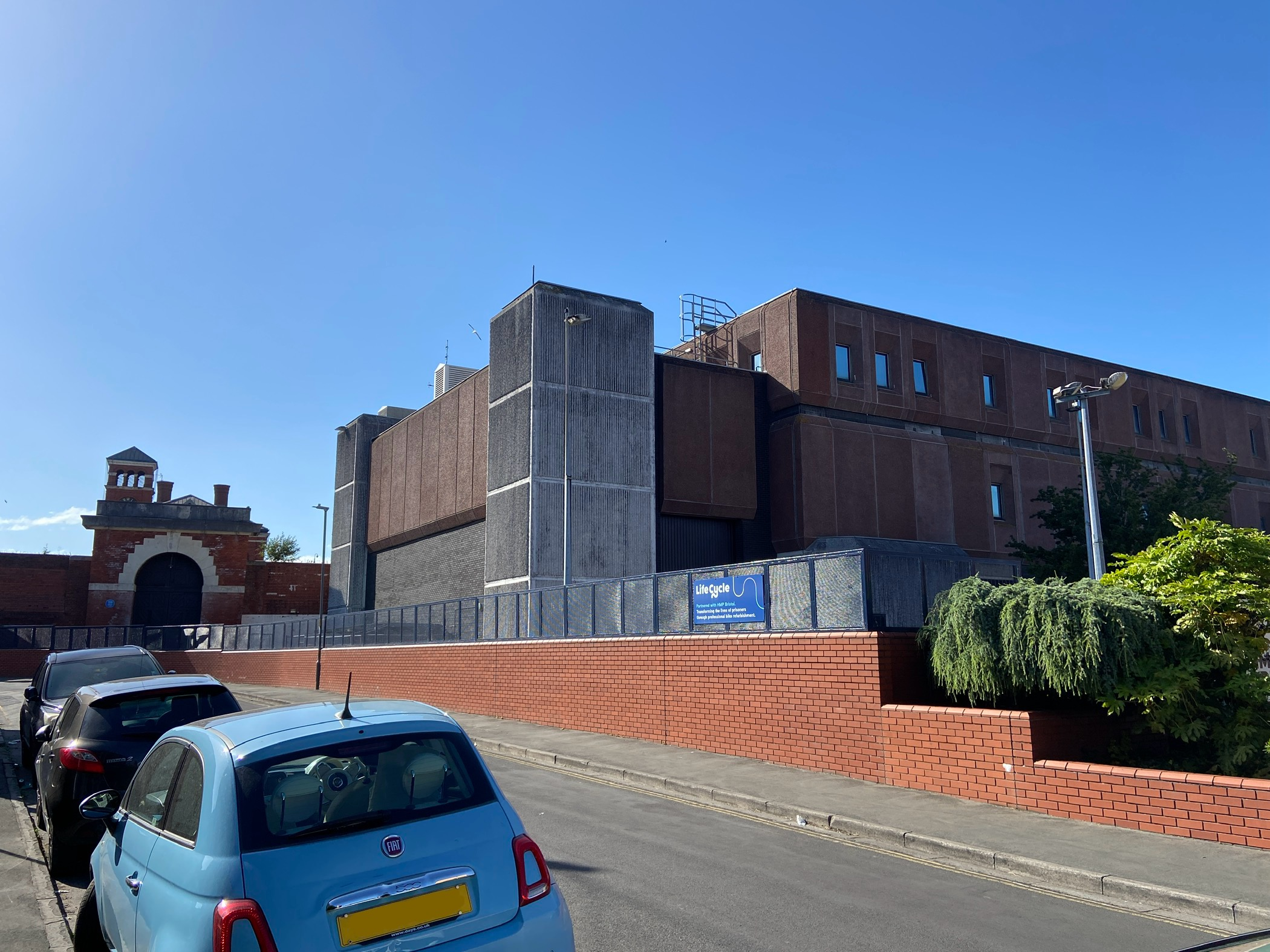
HM Prison Bristol on a bright day in May 2026

Bristol Prison currently holds adult males and YOI prisoners (18 to 21 years old) on remand to the local courts as well as convicted prisoners, including prisoners sentenced to life imprisonment and indeterminate sentences for public protection. It also acts as a Category B facility for the southwest of England.

The establishment was heavily criticised following an unannounced inspection in May 2013, in which it was reported that staff "racially abused" inmates, and on one occasion denied food to a serving prisoner. The same inspection also discovered that over half the population – a significant number of whom were unconvicted – spent 23 hours a day locked in a cell.

Drugs are smuggled into Bristol Prison leading to prisoners behaving unpredictably and being sometimes violent. Numbers of prison officers have also fallen since 2010. Violence is a problem with staff and prisoners being injured. Prison officers are reluctant to assert their authority and feel unsupported when violence happens due to low staffing numbers. Recruiting prison officers is difficult.

The prison provides courses in inter-personal skills and enhanced thinking as well as employment training. Some prisoners are employed in the prison workshops, kitchen, gymnasium or as cleaners on the wings. In addition there is a 24-hour listeners scheme operating at Bristol for prisoners who may be at risk from suicide or self-harm.

Healthcare at the prison consists of an Inpatient care unit with 24-hour nursing cover. There are also nurses posted to each wing during the core day to carry out treatments and triage prisoners with minor illness and injuries. There is a dedicated Integrated Drug Treatment Service (IDTS) at HMP Bristol which has achieved national recognition in the treatment, care and management of offenders with Drug and Alcohol misuse issues. This service is located on a dedicated wing with a multidisciplinary team that consists of Prison officers, Nurses and CARATs workers for drug counselling services. At all times during core day there is at least one GP on duty at the prison.

In June 2019 inspectors visited the prison, giving it the lowest gradings for safety and purposeful activity. Subsequently lack of care for vulnerable prisoners was highlighted by His Majesty's Chief Inspector of Prisons, and an "urgent notification" was issued to the prison by the Justice Secretary David Gauke.

== Notable inmates ==
- Charlie Deutsch, the horse racing jockey spent two and a half months at Bristol in 2018 after being charged with driving under the influence and evading arrest.
- Theresa Garnett, the suffragette, was sent there in 1909 for attacking Winston Churchill with a whip and went on hunger strike while inside.
- Gary Glitter, the shamed rock star spent two months at Bristol in 1999 for possession of child pornography.
- Ben Gunn, blogger and prison reform campaigner (held here as a juvenile, while on remand).
- Paddy Lacey, professional footballer who was jailed for being in possession of drugs and counterfeit banknotes.
- Montell Moore, former professional footballer convicted for rape.
- Darren Osment, convicted of the cold case murder of his former partner 11 years after he had committed the crime.
- John Straffen, the serial killer was held at Bristol from 1947 to 1949 for lesser charges.
