= Dorothy Darnell =

Scottish artist

Dorothy Gwynnyd Darnell (21 April 1876 - 12 October 1953) was an artist from Scotland and founder of the Jane Austen Society in Alton, Hampshire, England. The group was created to purchase the historic Chawton Cottage where novelist Jane Austen spent her last eight years. It is now Jane Austen's House Museum.

== Life ==
Dorothy Gwynnyd Darnell was born in Edinburgh, Midlothian, Scotland on 21 April 1876. She was the daughter of the Reverend Daniel Charles West Darnell (1841-1903), Vicar of Portsmouth from 1899 until his death from typhoid and pneumonia in 1903 and Elizabeth Darnell (née Fisher) (1844-1927).

She studied art under Sir William Nicholson and exhibited at the Royal Academy of Arts in 1904, 1906, 1907, 1908, 1910, 1912 and 1914. Her career as an artist was from 1904 to 1922. She lived at 25 Campden House Road, Kensington, London, during this time. She specialised in portrait painting, her most notable being one of Emily Daymond painted before 1922.

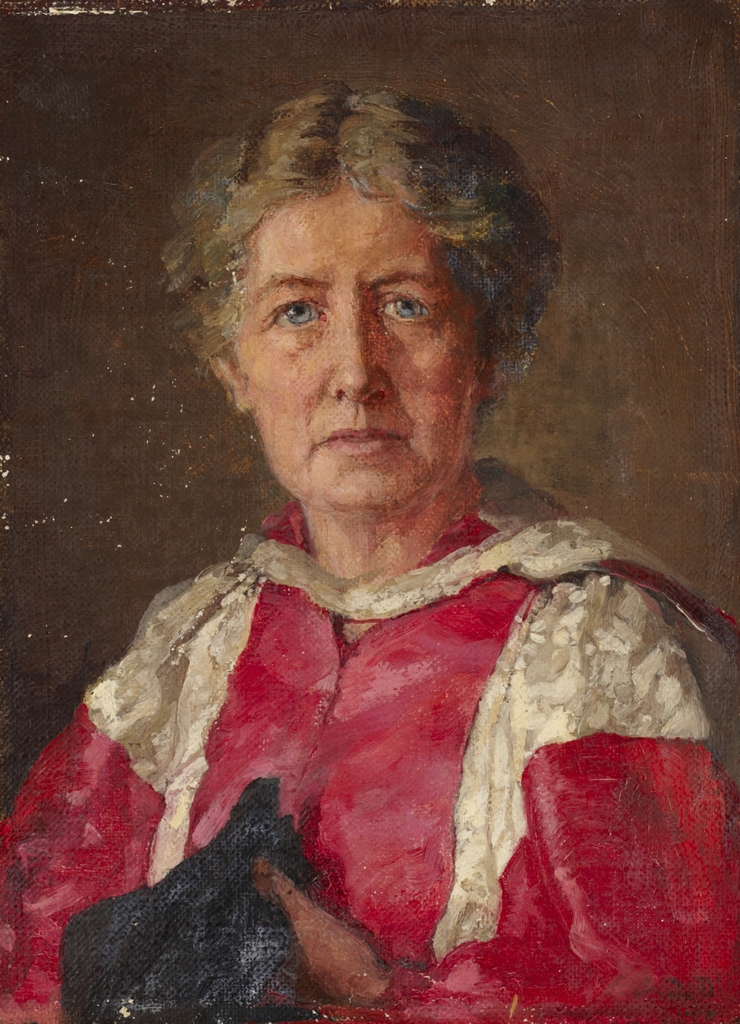
Portrait of Emily Daymond

Sometime before 1939, Dorothy Darnell moved to Alton, Hampshire where she lived with her sister, Amy Beatrix Darnell (1873-1970).

Dorothy Darnell was the inspiration behind the creation of the Jane Austen Society which she founded in 1940. The main purpose behind the creation of the society was in order to purchase Chawton Cottage, the house where Jane Austen lived from 1809 to 1817. Dorothy Darnell served as secretary of the society, a role shared with Elizabeth Jenkins. Her sister, Amy Beatrix Darnell served as the Treasurer of the society.

Dorothy died at home, at Brook Cottage, Lenten Street, Alton, Hampshire on 12 October 1953.
