= Curtis Museum =

Museum in Hampshire, England

Coordinates: 51.149926°N 0.974079°W

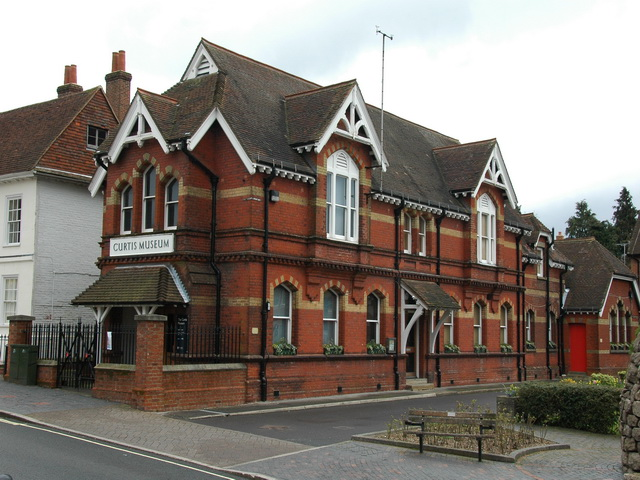
Curtis Museum, Alton

The Curtis Museum in Alton is a local history museum in Hampshire, England.

The museum was founded in 1865 by Dr William Curtis (1803–1881).

In 2014, ownership of the museum was transferred to the Hampshire Cultural Trust as part of a larger transfer of museums from Hampshire County Council and Winchester City Council.

== Displays ==
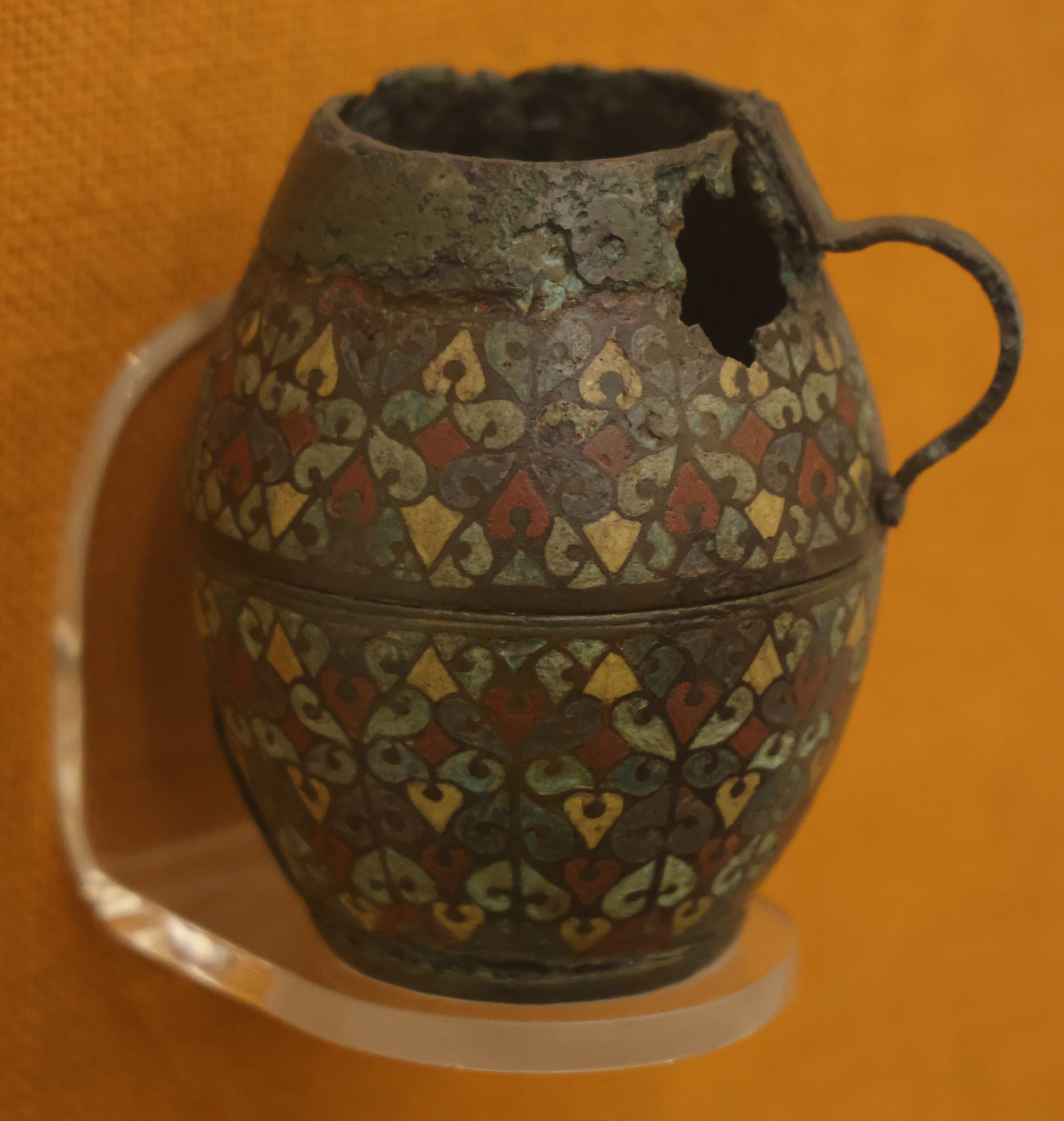
The Selborne cup

It contains a wide range of artefacts and displays including:

- Prehistoric tools
- Roman bowls and other material, including a cup found at Selborne
- The Anglo-Saxon Alton buckle
- Artefacts from the Battle of Alton (1643), a battle in the English Civil War
- The "Jane Austen Trail"
- The tale of Sweet Fanny Adams, who was murdered locally in 1867
- Hop picking and brewing

== Closure threats ==
In 2010, both the Curtis Museum and the Allen Gallery were under threat of closure, following their receipt of an email to that effect from the Museum & Arts Service. The Museum and Gallery were taken over by the Hampshire Museums and Galleries Trust, which ran both buildings with the help of volunteers, on behalf of Hampshire County Council. As of May 2014, management was transferred to Hampshire Cultural Trust. Further threat of closure was announced for 2026 due to funding cuts to the Hampshire County Council Cultural Services.
