= Sweet F A =

Sweet F A may refer to:

- A murder victim Fanny Adams
- British naval slang, of Sweet Fuck All.
- Sweet F.A. (album), an album by the British band, Love and Rockets.
- Sweet Female Attitude, an English UK garage/dance/R&B duo.
