= HM Prison Sudbury =

Prison in Sudbury, Derbyshire, England

Coordinates: 52.8942°N 1.7652°W

HMP Sudbury
- Interactive map of HMP Sudbury
- Location: Sudbury, Derbyshire
- Security class: Adult Male/Category D
- Population: 581 (August 2008)
- Opened: 1948
- Managed by: HM Prison Services
- Governor: Laura Day
- Website: Sudbury at justice.gov.uk

HM Prison Sudbury is a Category D men's prison, located in the village of Sudbury in Derbyshire, England. The prison is operated by His Majesty's Prison Service.

== History ==
Sudbury was originally constructed as a hospital for the United States Air Force for the D-Day landings. In 1948, the old hospital site was adapted for use as a prison. The original single-storey accommodation from the hospital still houses prisoners today, with newer additional single storey buildings also used. In 2003, a new Modular Temporary Unit was constructed at the site.

In December 2003, it emerged that 350 prisoners had absconded from Sudbury in five years. Management at the prison stated that this was a consequence of the prison having more inmates.

In June 2005, an inspection report from Her Majesty's Chief Inspector of Prisons praised Sudbury Prison. The report stated that Sudbury provided a safe and well-ordered environment for prisoners and staff. However the report called for certain facilities to be improved at the prison, particularly for elderly and disabled prisoners.

A further inspection report in September 2007 again praised Sudbury prison, despite the fact that more than 40 prisoners had absconded from the jail since January 2007. The report however did call for better healthcare services at the prison.

In August 2021, a former female prison officer was jailed for three years for forming a relationship with an inmate and helping him abscond from HMP Sudbury. The inmate walked out of the prison on 1 October 2019, where the officer picked him up and drove him to a train station. The inmate was eventually rearrested on 27 March 2020 and taken to HMP Winchester, where his phone calls were monitored and revealed his relationship with the guard at HMP Sudbury.

== The prison today ==
Sudbury is a Category D open prison for adult males. Accommodation at the prison comprises a mixture of single and double occupancy rooms.

Full-time and part-time education, as well as evening classes, are offered to inmates at HMP Sudbury. Workshops and training courses include bricklaying, painting & decorating, industrial cleaning, farms and gardens, catering and site maintenance.

A listener scheme for prisoners who may be at risk from suicide or self-harm is in operation, as well as an anti-bullying committee. There is a voluntary drug testing unit and a drug support group offering counselling and support for prisoners with drug problems

== Notable former inmates ==
- Ben Gunn, blogger and prison reform campaigner
- Darius Guppy, an Anglo-Iranian businessman, convicted of insurance fraud
- Lee Hughes, former West Bromwich Albion striker
- Harry Roberts, murdered three policemen
- Stinson Hunter (activist), Arson on a school
- Ricky Tomlinson, one of the Shrewsbury Two
