= Daymond =

Daymond is a given name and surname. Notable people with the name include:

== Given name ==
- Daymond John (born 1969), American businessman, television personality, and motivational speaker
- Daymond Langkow (born 1976), Canadian ice hockey player

== Surname ==
- Emily Daymond (1866–1949), English musician
- Irv Daymond (born 1962), Canadian football player
- Joe Daymond (born 1995), New Zealand actor, comedian
- Robbie Daymond (born 1982), American actor

== See also ==
- Draymond
