= Percy Andrews =

English footballer

Personal information
- Full name: Arthur Percy Andrews
- Date of birth: 12 June 1922
- Place of birth: Alton, England
- Date of death: 28 February 1985 (aged 62)
- Place of death: Pocklington, England
- Height: 5 ft 10 in (1.78 m)
- Position: Full back

Senior career*
Years	Team	Apps	(Gls)
	Portsmouth	0	(0)
1947–1954	York City	176	(0)
- * Club domestic league appearances and goals

Arthur Percy Andrews (12 June 1922 – 28 February 1985) was an English footballer who played 176 league games for York City F.C. He was known as a full back who also played centre half; according to the Liverpool Echo, he played in nearly every position during his long career.
