= Ben Gunn (campaigner) =

British consultant, writer, and convicted murderer

- Born: John Gunn; 1965 (age 60–61)
- Occupation: Consultant
- Organization: Mokurai Consulting
- Known for: Campaigning work
- Criminal charge: Murder
- Criminal penalty: Life imprisonment
- Criminal status: Released on licence
- Website: prisonerben.blogspot.co.uk

John "Ben" Gunn (born 1965) is a British consultant, writer, and campaigner on issues relating to prison life and justice. Convicted of murder at the age of 14, he served 32 years in prison before being released on licence.

== Background ==
Gunn grew up in Ystradgynlais, Powys, Wales, the youngest of seven children. His mother Violet died, age 46, from a heart attack when he was nine. He began to behave disruptively, and, as his father had been absent since his early childhood, his eldest sister had him placed in a children's home as she was unable to cope. At the age of 14, he fought on the way home from school with an eleven-year-old friend, Brian Talbot, who was a fellow resident at the home and a fellow pupil at Brecon High School. Gunn hit his friend on the head multiple times with the leg of a school desk, fracturing his skull. Gunn called an ambulance, remained at the scene, and confessed immediately. His friend was taken to hospital and Gunn was arrested and charged with causing grievous bodily harm. Four days later, the friend died, and the charge was changed to murder.

Gunn was remanded to an adult prison, Bristol prison, after the governor of a young offenders' institution refused to accept him. He was kept in a segregation unit and forced to wear clothing meant for prisoners at risk of self-harming.

At his trial, at Cardiff Crown Court, Gunn pleaded guilty to murder. The judge, Mr Justice Michael Davies said in summing up:

You killed a boy without rhyme or reason. You brought his life to an end without any motive in circumstances which you know amounted to murder, and it's to your credit that you have never attempted to deny that.

Gunn was ordered to be detained at Her Majesty's pleasure, with a tariff (minimum jail term) of 10 years.

== Life in prison ==
As a juvenile, Gunn spent the first two years of his sentence at a high-security unit home. He was then again placed in an adult prison. He later said of this change:

Within a week, I went from a situation of personalised treatment and intense education to an indifferent prison that attempted to strip me of the personality so many resources had been dedicated to shape.

In prison, Gunn earned the nickname "Ben" because he grew a large beard which was said to make him resemble the character Ben Gunn in Robert Louis Stevenson's Treasure Island.

Gunn's questioning of authority resulted in him being refused parole for more than twenty years past the end of his original tariff.

He studied for and obtained a BSc (Hons) in political theory and history and an MA (Merit) in peace and reconciliation, and began a PhD in non-violent action in prison.

He became general secretary of the Association of Prisoners, and joined the campaign to restore prisoners' voting rights. He maintained a blog by including his blog posts in letters to his partner, who scanned or typed the material and uploaded it on his behalf. In 2011, his blog was nominated for the Orwell Prize. While in prison, he also wrote for Inside Time, a newspaper for prisoners.

The Secretary of State for Education, Michael Gove MP, asked his cabinet colleague the Secretary of State for Justice, Kenneth Clarke to review the case, saying that:

it appears that an extremely intelligent, remorseful man has been punished excessively for a crime committed as a child.

Lord Ramsbotham, a former Chief Inspector of Prisons, also campaigned for his release.

In 2007, Gunn was in Shepton Mallet prison, where he met and began an illicit romantic relationship with a female teacher called Alex. Once the relationship was discovered, she was banned from visiting the prison. They maintained contact using a mobile phone which Gunn hid in his cell. He has credited her with changing his attitude to working towards obtaining parole.

From 2009 to 2012, Gunn was in Sudbury prison, Derbyshire.

== Post-release career ==
Gunn was released on licence on 22 August 2012, after 32 years' confinement. He resumed his relationship with Alex and they lived together for eight months, but then separated. His company, Mokurai Consulting, (named after a Zen monk and meaning "Silent Thunder") now manages his media appearances and provides services related to criminal justice and prison issues.

Gunn continues to campaign on prisoners' rights, prison reform, and on matters relating to false allegations of child abuse.

He has written a number of opinion pieces for The Guardian.

Gunn featured in a Channel 5 documentary called Hidden Histories.
