= Murder of William Rowe =

1963 murder in Cornwall, England

- Location: Nanjarrow Farm, Constantine, Falmouth, Cornwall, England
- Date: August 14, 1963 c. 11:00 pm
- Target: William Garfield Rowe
- Attack type: Murder (by blunt force trauma and stabbing)
- Weapons: Knife, iron bar, starting pistol
- Deaths: 1
- Victim: William Rowe
- Motive: Robbery (believed victim had a hidden fortune)
- Charges: Murder
- Verdict: Guilty
- Convictions: Murder
- Convicted: Dennis John Whitty, Russell Pascoe

The murder of William Rowe was committed in 1963 by Dennis John Whitty (1941 – 17 December 1963) and Russell Pascoe (1940 – 17 December 1963), making them the third-to-last prisoners to be executed by hanging in a British prison. Whitty and Pascoe were convicted for their part in the murder of 64-year-old Cornish farmer William Garfield Rowe on 14 August 1963. When executed, they were 22 and 23 years old respectively. Pascoe was executed at 8.00 am in Bristol's Horfield Prison on Tuesday, 17 December 1963. Pascoe and Whitty had believed that Rowe kept a fortune hidden on his farm, Nanjarrow Farm, Constantine, near Falmouth.

== Background ==
Dennis Whitty

During 1963, Whitty and 23-year-old Pascoe were living with three young women in a caravan at Kenwyn Caravan Park, on the outskirts of Truro, Cornwall. Whitty was working as a labourer at Truro Gas Works. Pascoe had previously worked as a labourer at Nanjarrow Farm, at Ponjeravah, Constantine, near Falmouth, and knew the farmer, William Rowe. Rowe was somewhat reclusive, living in the untidy sitting room of his farmhouse, the four bedrooms unoccupied after his mother and brother had died. Local rumour held that Rowe had a large sum of money concealed on the premises, and he had been the victim of a burglary in 1960, during which £200 and some other items had been stolen.

== Murder ==
On the night of Wednesday, 14 August 1963, Whitty and Pascoe travelled to Nanjarrow on Pascoe's motorcycle. They were armed with a starting pistol, a knife and an iron bar. Whitty was wearing dark jeans and a dark, double-breasted blazer with silver buttons. When they knocked on Rowe's door at around 11.00 pm and the old man opened it, Whitty used this uniform-like clothing to support a story that they had crashed a helicopter nearby, and he asked to use Rowe's telephone. They then attacked Rowe; Whitty with the knife and Pascoe with the iron bar, leaving the farmer dead with six or seven wounds to the head, a fractured skull, a broken jaw, a severed finger and five chest wounds, including one knife wound to the heart. They searched the house for the money, but came away with only £4 that Pascoe found in a piano, and Whitty's haul of a watch, two boxes of matches and some keys. They split the money and took £2 each, returning to the caravan at Truro. The girls they lived with later testified that Whitty was "grinning all over his face", and that Pascoe was seen wiping blood from Whitty's face. The following day, Pascoe's girlfriend confronted Whitty with a copy of the evening newspaper, which contained details of Rowe's murder. She asked Whitty, "You went to Constantine. Did you do this?" Whitty replied, "Yes I did." The girl later claimed that Whitty and Pascoe threatened to kill the girls if they told anyone what they knew.

== Arrest and trial ==
The local police were soon tipped off about the murder by one of the three girls. On 16 August, a policeman saw Pascoe riding his motorcycle in Constantine, stopped him and asked him to report for routine questioning at the murder headquarters. Pascoe claimed that he had been in the caravan in Truro at the time of the murder, but when Pascoe admitted knowing Rowe and working for him in the past, the police realised that Pascoe had worked for Rowe at the time of the burglary in 1960. Whitty was then also brought in for questioning. The following day, each man was questioned and told that they were suspected of committing the murder.

Whitty and Pascoe each blamed each other, with Whitty accusing Pascoe of beating Rowe with the iron bar, and then forcing Whitty to use the knife. Whitty admitted stabbing Rowe but stated, "Pascoe made me stick him." Pascoe told the police that Whitty had instigated the attack, admitting only to knocking Rowe out with the iron bar. He claimed that Whitty "went mad with the knife", then took the bar from Pascoe and repeatedly struck Rowe with it.

When charged and cautioned, Whitty replied, "We are both over twenty-one, so I suppose we can hang?" He subsequently gave a written statement outlining the events on the night of the murder, and his claim that Pascoe had forced him into continuing the attack on Rowe.

At Rowe's farmhouse, police found a small diary in a desk, with descriptive notes written in Esperanto, referring to the whereabouts of various sums of money. Having translated the notes, the executors of Rowe's will used them to find a number of caches of money, including in a safe set in concrete, covered by straw in a cowshed; and a large glass jar containing hundreds of banknotes, hidden elsewhere on the property. The full amount that was eventually found was not revealed, but was referred to as "thousands of pounds".

At the trial at Bodmin Assizes, beginning on 29 October, the murder was described as "brutal and savage in the extreme". Whitty was defended by Mr Norman Skelhorn, QC, who entered a plea of 'not guilty'. Skelhorn claimed that Whitty had either been acting under the influence of Pascoe, or that Whitty's psychiatric background was such that he may be guilty of manslaughter on grounds of diminished responsibility. He clarified that Whitty was suffering from a hysterical condition and experienced blackouts. Whitty himself claimed that he had seen "strange and unnatural things", such as doors opening on their own and pictures changing places on walls overnight. He also said he believed in ghosts and had seen "a figure with wings" on a beach one night.

A key defence witness was 19-year-old student (and future Liberal Party politician) David Penhaligon, whose father was the owner of the caravan site where Pascoe and Whitty had been living with the three girls. He testified that Whitty was prone to epileptic fits which (Whitty claimed) caused him to be violent.

The jury debated for four and a half hours before returning with guilty verdicts for both Whitty and Pascoe, and they were sentenced to death by the Judge, Mr Justice Thesiger. On 2 November 1963, the two men were driven to separate prisons: Whitty to Winchester Prison and Pascoe to Horfield Prison in Bristol.

== Appeal and execution ==
On 23 November, Whitty and Pascoe's appeals were heard and rejected by the Court of Appeal, and the executions were set for Tuesday, 17 December. Clemency was refused first by Home Secretary Henry Brooke and then by the Queen.

Pascoe was hanged by Harry Allen (assisted by Royston Rickard) on 17 December, at 8.00 am; the same time as Whitty was being hanged at Winchester Prison by Robert Leslie Stewart (assisted by Harry Robinson). A demonstration was held outside Horfield Prison at the time of the hanging; the demonstrators included Tony Benn, the Labour MP for Bristol South East, and the Bishop of Bristol, Oliver Tomkins. Whilst awaiting execution Pascoe was baptised and confirmed by Tomkins. A smaller demonstration was held outside Winchester Prison which was attended by banner-waving protesters, plus Whitty's fiancée, Bridget Hamilton (who collapsed as a clock chimed the execution hour) and a group of Quakers.

Shortly afterwards, both men were buried in unmarked graves within the walls of the prisons where they had been executed, as was the custom.

Only two more prisoners were subsequently executed in Britain, in August 1964: Peter Allen (hanged by Stewart at HMP Walton) and Gwynne Evans (simultaneously hanged by Allen at HMP Strangeways), for the murder of John Alan West.

== Legacy ==
The Scottish writer Robert Douglas was then a prison guard assigned to help look after Pascoe in the condemned cell at Horfield Prison during Pascoe's final days, the story of which formed part of the third volume of Douglas's autobiography (entitled At Her Majesty's Pleasure).

Pascoe's last moments were the subject of a BBC documentary in 2012, presented by Gethin Jones.
