= William de Alton =

14th-century English Dominican theologian

William de Alton (born 1307) was a Dominican friar from Alton, Hampshire, who lived during the reign of Edward II. He is known for writing The Universality of the Pollution of Mankind by Original Sin. This tract on original sin argues that in its polluting all of mankind it must also have thereby polluted the Virgin Mary, thus contradicting the doctrine of the Immaculate Conception.
