= Neatham =

Hamlet in Hampshire, England

Coordinates: 51.161426°N 0.941539°W

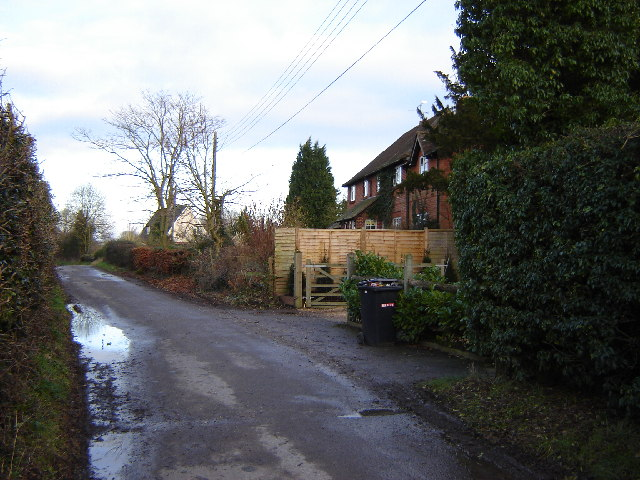

- Location within Hampshire
- OS grid reference: SU7411240774
- Civil parish: Alton
- District: East Hampshire
- Shire county: Hampshire
- Region: South East
- Country: England
- Sovereign state: United Kingdom
- Post town: ALTON
- Postcode district: GU34 4
- Dialling code: 01420
- Police: Hampshire and Isle of Wight
- Fire: Hampshire and Isle of Wight
- Ambulance: South Central
- UK Parliament: East Hampshire

Neatham is a Roman hamlet, an ancient hundred and a former civil parish, now in the parish of Alton, in the East Hampshire district of Hampshire, England. Its nearest town is Alton, which lies 1.6 miles (2.6 km) south-west from the hamlet. In 1931 the parish had a population of 134.

== History ==
=== Roman period – Vindomis ===
The lost Roman settlement of Vindomis is believed to be at Neatham. Its strategic importance lay in its being at the crossing of important roads: one from Winchester towards London and the other from Chichester to Silchester, a large Roman town to the north of present-day Basingstoke. The name Vindomis might be translated as ‘(The mansio) of the wine country’ (although this may equally be a Celtic name, with the prefix VINDO-'white'). Vindomis may well have been the administrative centre of a large estate associated with the potteries. The population at this time is estimated to have been 2,500.

Neatham was formerly a tything in the parish of Holybourne. From 1866 Neatham was a civil parish in its own right; on 1 April 1932 the parish was abolished and merged with Alton and Binsted.

=== Saxon period – Neatham ===
After the Romans left, it became a Saxon settlement, called Neatham, indicating the presence of a cattle market. For several centuries, Neatham remained the chief place in the area and the focal point of Neatham Hundred, which included a large part of north-east Hampshire.

=== Norman period ===
At the time of the Domesday Book in 1085, Neatham was recorded as a hundred belonging to the Crown comprising 96 households. Neatham Hundred included 24 other places. After the founding of Waverley Abbey in 1128, King Steven made a gift of Neatham for the Abbey to establish a Grange and an Oratory, with a community of 12 monks, independent of the parish of Holybourne. Eventually, Neatham was eclipsed by Alton and, in the 12th century, the area was renamed the Alton Hundred.

=== Tudor period ===
When Henry VIII dissolved the monasteries, Neatham went into lay hands and became part of the parish of Binsted.

=== Modern day ===
In the 1980s, Neatham elected to be joined to Holybourne. Neatham is now a hamlet comprising a Manor House, a Grange, a mill, and a dozen cottages. Today, the hamlet lies along the Alton bypass between Alton and Farnham. Its Grade I buildings and mills still remain.

== Notable buildings ==
Neatham Grange

- Mill House (C.19)

Upper Neatham Mill

- Mill House. Possible C.18 or earlier.
- Barn

Neatham Mill

- Mill and Barn . Mostly C.19.
- Dovecote C.18

Neatham Manor

- Manor House Possible C.18.
- Dovecote C.16/17
