= John Martin (cricketer, born 1942) =

Australian cricketer (born 1942)

Personal information
- Born: 8 May 1942 (age 84); Alton, Hampshire, England
- Source: ESPNcricinfo, 7 January 2017

John Martin (born 8 May 1942) is an Australian cricketer. He played eight first-class and one List A matches for New South Wales between 1966/67 and 1969/70.

== See also ==
- List of New South Wales representative cricketers
