= George Rumbold =

English footballer

Personal information
- Full name: George Arthur Rumbold
- Date of birth: 10 July 1911
- Place of birth: Alton, England
- Date of death: 12 December 1995 (aged 84)
- Place of death: Ipswich, England
- Height: 5 ft 11 in (1.80 m)
- Position: Full back

Senior career*
Years	Team	Apps	(Gls)
–1934	Farringdon United		
1934–1937	Crystal Palace	5	(0)
1937–1946	Leyton Orient	52	(0)
1946–1950	Ipswich Town	121	(11)
- King's Lynn
- Whitton United
- * Club domestic league appearances and goals

George Arthur Rumbold (10 July 1911 – 12 December 1995) was an English professional footballer who made over 120 appearances in the Football League for Ipswich Town as a full back. He also played League football for Leyton Orient and Crystal Palace.

== Career statistics ==
Appearances and goals by club, season and competition
Club	Season	League			FA Cup		Other		Total	
Club	Season	Division	Apps	Goals	Apps	Goals	Apps	Goals	Apps	Goals
Ipswich Town	1946–47	Third Division South	42	0	3	0	2 (Note: 1 appearance in Ipswich Hospital Cup, 1 appearance in Norfolk Jubilee Cup)	0	47	0
Ipswich Town	1947–48	Third Division South	42	5	1	0	2	0	45	5
Ipswich Town	1948–49	Third Division South	35	6	0	0	0	0	35	6
Ipswich Town	1949–50	Third Division South	2	0	1	0	1 (Note: Appearance in Norfolk Jubilee Cup)	0	4	0
Career total			121	11	5	0	5	0	131	11

== Honours ==
Ipswich Town

- Ipswich Hospital Cup: 1947–48
- Norfolk Jubilee Cup: 1949–50
