= Ernst Pauer =

Austrian pianist, composer and educator (1826 - 1905)

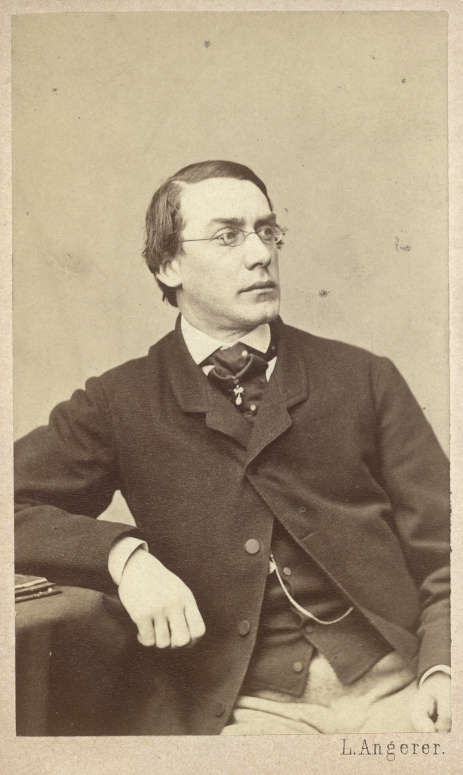
Ernst Pauer c 1896

Ernst Pauer (21 December 1826 – 5 May 1905) was an Austrian pianist, composer and educator.

== Biography ==
Pauer formed a direct link with great Viennese traditions: he was born in Vienna, his mother was a member of the famous Streicher family of piano makers, and for a time (1839–44) he was a piano pupil of Mozart's son, F. X. W. Mozart and a composition student of Simon Sechter. After further study with Franz Lachner in Munich (1845–47) he worked as a conductor and composer in Mainz, before moving to London in 1851.

During the Great 1862 International Exhibition in South Kensington he was engaged to perform daily piano recitals in the Exhibition building.

From the outset Pauer's piano playing was admired in London, and there he developed a series of concerts, with copious programme notes, that illustrated the development of keyboard music from 1600 to modern times; in later years he lectured on this and many other topics. For five years, he was on the staff of the National Training School for Music (1859–64) and was later recruited in 1876 as principal Piano Professor in the newly formed Royal College of Music. He was also associated with the music faculty of University of Cambridge. Pauer's pupils included Alfred Anderson, William Carter, Eugen d'Albert, Emily Daymond, Stephen Kemp, Emma Mundella, Jane Roeckel, Bernhard Scholz, Charles Villiers Stanford, Edmund Hart Turpin, Ernest Walker, and Agnes Zimmermann.

Pauer's interest in early keyboard music and historically informed performance was reflected in his numerous editions. He was also active as an author and arranger. He retired in 1896 to Jugenheim in Germany, where he died in 1905.

His son Max von Pauer (1866–1945) became a world-renowned pianist too.

== Selected list of works ==
=== Books ===
- The elements of the beautiful in music. London, Novello, 1876
- The art of pianoforte playing. London, Novello, Ewer and Co., 1877
- Musical forms. London, New York, Novello and Co., H.W. Gray Co, 1878
- The birthday book of musicians and composers. London, Edinburgh Forsyth Bros., 1881
- A dictionary of pianists and composers for the pianoforte. With an appendix of manufacturers of the instrument. London, Novello, Ewer & Co.'s Music Primers, etc. No. 46, 1895
- The Culture of the Left Hand. A Collection of useful and practical [P. F.] Exercises and Studies for giving strength, firmness, independence and suppleness to the left hand. Selected, fingered, revised and edited by E. Pauer, etc. London, Augener, 1907

=== Music Editions ===
- Alte Claviermusik in chronologischer Folge neu hrsg. und mit Vortragszeichen vers. von E. Pauer. Leipzig, Senff, o. J.
- Alte Meister. Sammlung werthvoller Klavierstücke des 17. und 18. Jahrhunderts. Leipzig, Breitkopf und Härtel, o. J., 3 Bände
- R. Schumann's vocal album. London, Augener, o. D.
- The piano works of F. Mendelssohn-Bartholdy edited by E. Pauer. London, Augener, 1865-1873
- Recollections of Meyerbeer. Six transcriptions for the Pianoforte. London, 1867
- Winter Journey. Die Winterreise. 24 Songs with pianoforte accompaniment. Edited by E. Pauer. Eng. & Ger. Offenbach s./M, Chez Jean André, 1871
- Das wohltemperierte Klavier. 48 preludes and fugues by J.S. Bach. 1874
- 50 harpsichord lessons selected, revised and fingered by E. Pauer. 1877
- The complete Piano works of W. A. Mozart, edited by E. Pauer. 1874
- The complete Piano Works by F. Schubert, edited by E. Pauer. London, Augener, 1874
- Mendelssohn-Bartholdy. Complete works for Pianoforte and Orchestra with a compressed score of the Orchestral accompaniments to be used on a second Pianoforte. Arranged and revised by E. Pauer. London, 1879
- The piano works of Robert Schumann, edited by E. Pauer. 1879 (?)
- Complete Pianoforte solo works [by Haydn, Joseph]. Edited by E. Pauer. London, 1879
- The Children's Beethoven. Short pieces for the Pianoforte revised by E. Pauer. London, Augener, 1879
- Old English Composers for the Virginals & Harpsichord. A collection of preludes, galliards, pavanes, grounds, chaconnes, suites, overtures, sonatas, etc. etc. selected from the works of William Byrde, Dr. John Bull, Orlando Gibbons, Dr. John Blow, Henry Purcell and Dr. Thomas Augustine Arne. Revised & edited by E. Pauer. With biographical notices by W. A. Barrett, etc. 1879
- The complete piano solo works by C. M. von Weber, edited by E. Pauer. London, Augener, 1879
- Transcriptions for the Pianoforte by F. Liszt. Revised by E. Pauer, 1880
- Schulhoff-Album. Favorite Pianoforte Pieces. Edited by E. Pauer. London, Augener & Co, 1882-1878
- Complete Piano Works of L. van Beethoven. Edited by Ernst Pauer. London, Augener & Co., 1865 - 1873
- 50 Special and Preparatory Studies for the pianoforte intended as an assistance to a thoroughly artistic performance of Beethoven's Sonatas. London, Augener & Co, 1895
- Zemiroth Israel, traditional Hebrew melodies chanted in the synagogue and the home edited, harmonized and arranged for the pianoforte by Ernst Pauer; with an explanatory preface by Francis L. Cohen. London, Augener, 1896
- The complete dances by L. van Beethoven, edited, revised and partly arranged for the pianoforte by E. Pauer. London, Augener & Co., ca. 1892
- Alte Tänze. Samml. d. berühmtesten dt., franz. u. ital. Gavotten; für Pianoforte ausgew., theilw. einger. u. durchges. von E. Pauer. Leipzig, Breitkopf und Härtel, 1910
