= Barragon =

Barragon is a light corded cotton for summer wear. It was particularly popular in the eighteenth and nineteenth centuries.

'Barragon coats' are referred to several times in the records of eighteenth century criminal trials in the Old Bailey, London, England, with the average valuation at 20 shillings. (£1.00, equivalent to £187 in 2025)
