= Emily Daymond =

British musician

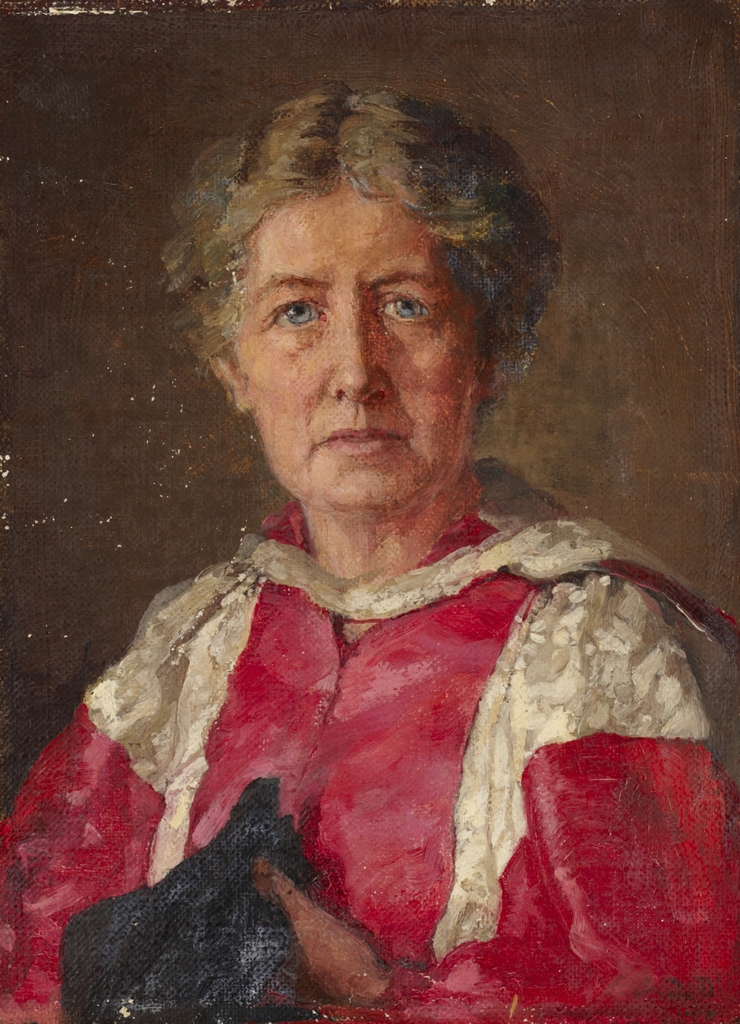
Painting by Dorothy Darnell

Emily Rosa Daymond (11 July 1866 – 10 October 1949) was an English musician.

Daymond was born in Framlingham, Suffolk, the daughter of the Reverend Albert Cooke Daymond, headmaster of a boys’ school – Timsbury. She entered the Royal College of Music as a Foundation Scholar on 7 May 1883, when the college first opened, studying with Ernst Pauer (piano), Richard Gompertz (violin), Dr. Frederick Bridge (harmony and counterpoint) and Dr. Hubert Parry, eventually becoming devoted disciple of Parry.

She completed her studies at the Royal College of Music, passed her examinations for the bachelor of music degree at Oxford in 1896 and for her doctor of music in 1901. It took Oxford another twenty years to allow women to hold the degrees they had won. Daymond held the post of Music Lecturer at the Royal Holloway College for Women. From 1908 to 1921 she taught piano and harmony at the Royal College of Music. Daymond matriculated in 1921 as a member of St Hugh's College, Oxford.

In addition to her teaching, Daymond conducted choirs, lectured and made a study of Troubadour music. She produced two books of Score-Reading Exercises for the Novello Primer Series and published several of her own compositions. Daymond was also a keen sportswoman. Toward the end of her life, she learned Bach's Well-Tempered Clavier by heart so she would have them with her when she was blind.
