= Murder of Fanny Adams =

1867 English murder

Fanny Adams
- Illustrated Police News portrait of Adams
- Born: 30 April 1859; Alton, Hampshire, England
- Died: 24 August 1867 (aged 8); Alton, Hampshire, England
- Cause of death: Blunt force trauma
- Body discovered: 24 August 1867
- Known for: Victim of a notorious murder

Fanny Adams (30 April 1859 – 24 August 1867) was an eight-year-old English girl who was murdered by Frederick Baker, a solicitor's clerk, in Alton, Hampshire, in 1867. Her murder was extraordinarily brutal and caused a national outcry in the United Kingdom. Baker abducted Adams and took her into a hop garden near her home, where he killed and dismembered her; some parts of her body were never found. An investigation suggested that two small knives were used for the murder, but it was later ruled they would have been insufficient to carry out the crime and that another weapon must have been used. Baker was found guilty and sentenced to death by hanging.

== Background ==
Fanny Adams (born 30 April 1859) and her family lived in Tanhouse Lane on the northern side of Alton, a market town in Hampshire. The 1861 census shows that Fanny lived with her father and five siblings. The family was locally rooted; George Adams and his wife Ann, believed to be Fanny's grandparents, lived next door. (Note: George Adams junior, originally a labourer, married Harriet Mills in 1850, who had Ellen (born 1852); two sons, George (born 1853) and Walter (1856); Fanny (1859), baptised on 31 July; Elizabeth "Lizzie" (1862); Lily Ada (1866); and Minnie (1871).)

Fanny was described as a "tall, comely and intelligent girl". She appeared older than her actual age of eight and was known locally for her lively and cheerful disposition. Her best friend, Minnie Warner, was the same age and lived next door in Tanhouse Lane. Alton was renowned for its plentiful supply of hops, which led to many breweries opening in the town and made hop picking an integral part of its economy until the mid-20th century. To the northern end of Tanhouse Lane lies Flood Meadow and the surrounding River Wey, which sometimes flooded the area in times of heavy rain. A large hop garden was next to the meadow.

== Murder ==
An illustration of Fanny Adams' abduction by Illustrated Police News

Alton had previously seen no serious crime during the 19th century. The afternoon of 24 August 1867 was reported as fine, sunny and hot. Around this time, Fanny, her sister Lizzie and best friend Minnie asked Harriet Adams, the sisters' mother, if they could go out to the nearby Flood Meadow. Having no objections and being pleased for the girls to leave her while she was getting on with housework, Harriet agreed. Fanny and the local children had often played in Flood Meadow, owing to its proximity to Tanhouse Lane and the fact that there had been little crime in Alton within living memory.

As the girls were walking towards Flood Meadow and into a hop garden, they met Frederick Baker, a 29-year-old solicitor's clerk. He wore a frock coat, light-coloured trousers and a tall hat. Baker had moved from his former home in Guildford to work and live in Alton about twelve months previously. He was employed by solicitor Mr. Clements, whose office was situated on Alton High Street, opposite the Swan Hotel, a hostelry which Baker frequented.

Baker gave Minnie and Lizzie three halfpennies to spend on sweets and Fanny another halfpenny. The girls had seen Baker before at church meetings and were thus unconcerned about taking money from him. Baker then watched the girls run up and down The Hollow (a lane leading to the nearby village of Shalden) as they played and ate the blackberries he had picked for them. An hour later, Lizzie and Minnie decided they had had enough and opted to go home. Baker then approached Fanny and asked her to accompany him to Shalden. Fanny refused, and it was then that Baker abducted her and carried her into the nearby hop garden.

Lizzie and Minnie ran back to Minnie's mother, Martha Warner, on Tanhouse Lane. She ignored their story, so the girls played together, oblivious of Fanny's abduction. It was not until 5 pm that they went home for dinner. Mrs. Gardner, who also lived on Tanhouse Lane, noticed Fanny's absence and asked the girls her whereabouts. The children relayed what had occurred earlier in the day and told Mrs. Gardner that Baker had taken Fanny away. Mrs. Gardner then relayed the information to Fanny's mother, Harriet, and the two women searched for her. They met with Baker after going only a short distance, near a gate separating the hop garden from Flood Meadow.

According to the Hampshire Chronicle, Mrs. Gardner asked Baker what he had done with the child. Baker assured her that he often gave money to children to buy sweets. Mrs. Gardner replied, "I have a great mind to give you in charge of the police," to which Baker told her she could do what she liked. Baker's position in town as the solicitor's clerk initially deflected any suspicions the two women had. Both returned to their homes, believing Fanny was still playing in one of the surrounding fields.

=== Discovery ===
Between 7 and 8 pm, Fanny had still not returned home, prompting Harriet and a group of neighbours to search for the missing child. As the evening was setting, the group began the search in The Hollow with no success. In the nearby hop garden, however, labourer Thomas Gates (a Crimean War veteran who partook in the famous Charge of the Light Brigade) found Fanny's head stuck on two hop poles while he was tending to the crops.

Fanny's ear had been severed from the head, which had two large cuts from mouth to ear across the temple. Further investigation discovered the remains of the child; the head, arms and legs were separated from the trunk. There were three incisions on the left side of the chest and a deep cut on the left arm, dividing her muscles. Fanny's forearm was cut off at the elbow joint, and her left leg nearly severed at the hip joint, with her left foot cut off at the ankle point. Her right leg was torn from the trunk, and the whole contents of her pelvis and chest were completely removed. Five further incisions had been made on the liver. Her heart had been cut out, and her vagina was missing. Both of her eyes were cut out and found in the nearby River Wey.

Overwhelmed with grief, Harriet collapsed on her way to inform her husband, George, who was playing cricket at the time, so the word was sent instead. When George was told the details he returned home to take his loaded shotgun and set out to look for the culprit, but neighbours stopped him and instead sat with him through the night. The next day, hundreds of people visited the hop garden to help collect Fanny's scattered remains. The police tried, unsuccessfully, to find the murder weapons, as they suspected that small knives were used to commit the crime. Likely, the crowd of searchers had inadvertently trampled any clues on the ground. They did, however, recover all of Fanny's cut clothing scattered around the field, except for her hat.

Most of Fanny's body parts were collected that day, but an arm, foot and intestines were not found until the next morning. One foot was still in a shoe, and still clutched in one hand were the two halfpence that Baker had given to Fanny. The breast bone was never found. Fanny's remains were taken to the doctor's surgery, located in Amery Street, for a post-mortem to be carried out. There, Fanny's body parts were sewn together. From there, Hampshire Constabulary officers took them to the local police station. A stone that still had flesh and hair sticking to it was handed to the police as evidence, as they thought it might be the murder weapon.

=== Arrest of Frederick Baker ===
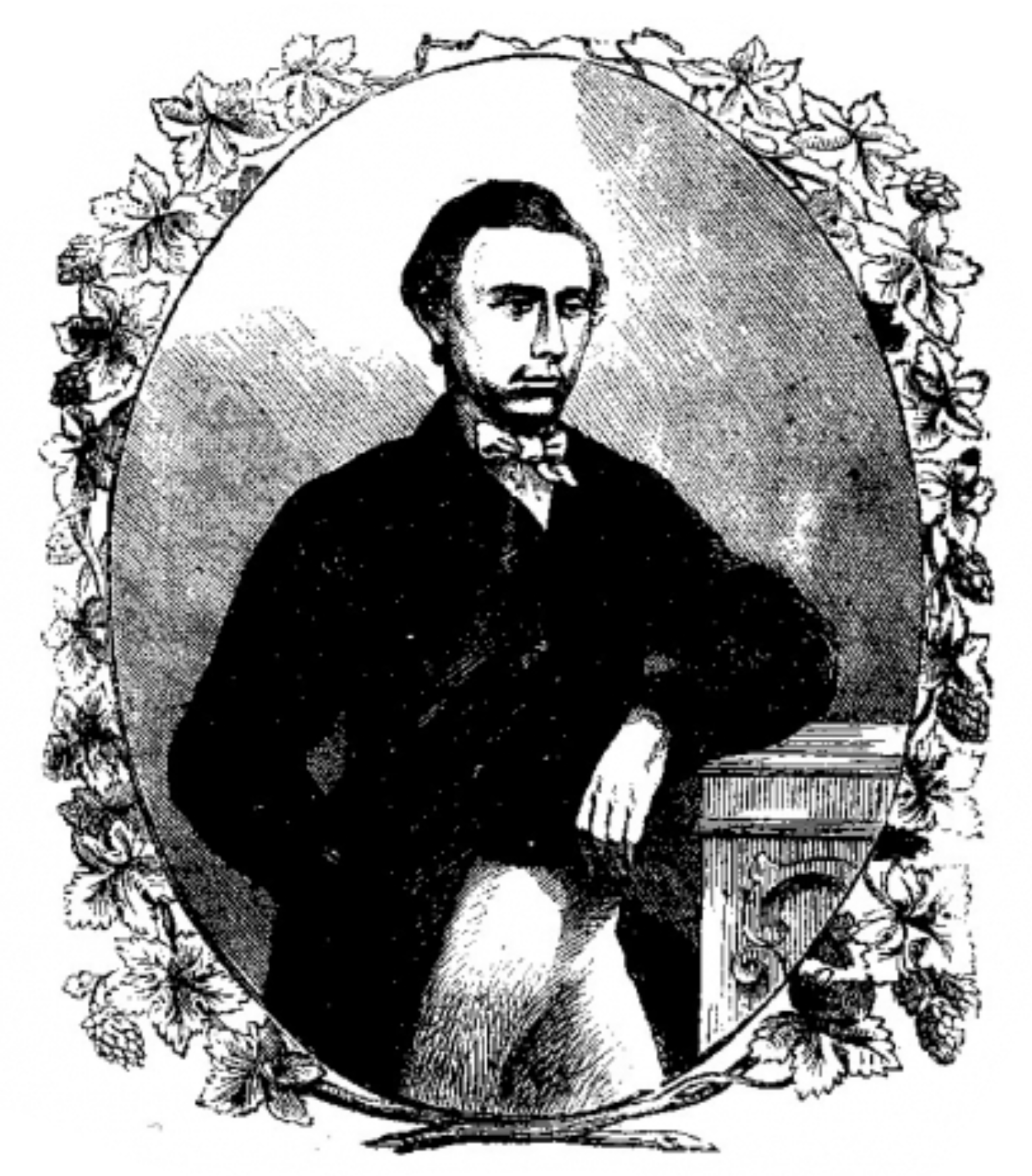
Frederick Baker

The Leathern Bottle, where Fanny's remains were collected and reassembled.

That evening, Police Superintendent William Cheyney hurried from the police station to Flood Meadow, where he was met by several people, who then led him to the Leathern Bottle. Upon arrival, the proprietor of the house handed Cheyney a bundle labeled "portions of a child", and, with the help of some of his officers, Cheyney organised a search to trace the missing body parts. Hearing that Baker had been seen with the children before Fanny's disappearance, Cheyney retraced his steps through the town and located his place of work. Arriving at the solicitor's office at 9 pm, he found Baker still at work, an hour later than usual. Baker protested, claiming his innocence despite being informed he was the only suspect. Cheyney had no alternative but to arrest Baker on suspicion of murder. By this time, a large and agitated crowd had gathered outside the solicitor's office, forcing the police to smuggle Baker out the back door for fear that the mob would lynch him.

When searched at the police station, Baker was found to have two unstained small knives. Spots of blood were observed on both wristbands of his shirt, and his trousers had been soaked to conceal the bloodstains. After being questioned about his appearance, Baker responded: "Well, I don't see a scratch or cut on my hands to account for the blood". Baker's conduct during his interrogation was described as cool and collected. Sometime after the arrest, Cheyney backtracked to Baker's desk in the solicitor's office and discovered a diary among some legal papers. An entry had been made for Saturday, 24 August 1867, which recorded: "Killed a young girl. It was fine and hot."

The Chronicle reported that the hop garden had been cleared on 21 September, but nothing connected with the murder had been found. It also added that Baker remained completely unfazed by the killing and did not exhibit any symptoms of insanity or remorse. Further confusion was added when Baker stated that he was intoxicated after seeing the children; all evidence and witnesses rejected his claim. Baker was transferred to Winchester Prison on 19 October.

== Investigation ==
Subsequent investigations from Hampshire Constabulary continued until October 1867. Around this time, a young boy whose parents lived close to the Adams family came forward as an eyewitness. The boy testified that he saw Baker emerge from the hop garden at about 2 pm on the day Fanny was murdered, with his hands and clothes saturated with blood. Baker then reportedly stooped down to the river and calmly wiped himself with a handkerchief, after which he put a small knife and another unidentified object in his jacket pocket. The boy had related this story to his mother then, but she had not told anyone until she spoke out in a pub two months later. The police searched the whole area for sixteen days, but no other weapons were found.

Cheyney requested an immediate forensic test in late October. All recovered clothing and the two knives taken from Baker at the time of his arrest were sent to A.S. Taylor at Guy's Hospital in London, where they received the most detailed tests possible for the period. After examining the items over the coming weeks, Taylor was able to confirm that the blood on the knives was human. One of the knives contained a small amount of coagulated blood, although none was on the handle. Under cross-examination, Taylor stated he would have expected more blood on the knives and signs of rust if they had been washed. The quantity of blood found, however, was surprisingly small. However, Taylor opined that an inexperienced person armed with a proper weapon could dismember a body in about half an hour—blood would still run but would not have spurted from the body. Further examination of Baker's clothes uncovered small traces of diluted blood in some of his waistcoat, trousers and stockings. The wristbands of his shirt had been folded back, and diluted blood stained the folds. There was no sign of rape on the body.

Lewis Leslie, a surgeon with the local police who examined Fanny's remains, thought that her ultimate cause of death was probably by a blow to the head with a stone. He speculated that a larger instrument had to have been used to cut the body and also added that dismemberment was achieved in less than an hour. Forensics indicated that cuts had been made when the body was still warm and that Fanny had not only been cut but also hacked and torn to pieces. The time it had taken Baker to cut the body into so many pieces most likely allowed him to choose his positioning so that he might not necessarily be covered in blood. The forensic staff in London concluded that the small knives found in Baker's possession would not have been capable of severing parts of Fanny's body, so another weapon must have been used.

Meanwhile, in Winchester Prison, Baker was talkative to the wardens, especially the chaplain. He still insisted that his conscience was clear concerning the murder and wondered who the guilty party was, hoping that "he would be found." Baker ate and slept well, unlike in Alton's prison, where he was reportedly disturbed in his sleep and physically shuddered at the sight of meat.

== Trial ==
English law at the time required that in the case of sudden death, an immediate inquest had to be held under the jurisdiction of a coroner. In the case of Fanny Adams' inquest, Deputy County Coroner Robert Harfield was in charge of the proceedings, which were held at the Dukes Head Inn (later re-named the George) in Alton on 27 August 1867. Cheyney and acting Chief Constable Superintendent Everitt, who represented Hampshire Constabulary, were in attendance. Coincidentally, the pub where the initial trials were held was very close to the police station, which is now the site of a fire station.

The first to give evidence was Minnie Warner, who told the jury that Baker had given her money to run down The Hollow with Fanny and into a nearby field while he picked blackberries for them. She was unable to identify Baker but correctly described what he was wearing when he murdered Fanny. The next to testify was Fanny's mother, Harriet, who recalled that she met Baker at the gate to the hop garden and that he was headed towards the road which led to Basingstoke. Minnie identified Baker as the man who gave her the pennies there. Baker contradicted Minnie then by saying, "No, three halfpence." When Harriet asked him to give his name, Baker refused but told her where he could be found.

Mrs. Gardner, who had accompanied Harriet to search for the missing girl, gave evidence next. She was able to identify Baker and told the jury that he appeared to be very relaxed at the time she saw him. After asking him if he had seen the missing child and enquiring why he had given her money, Mrs. Gardner told Harriet that she should "give him in charge to the police," adding, "The reason why I speak so is that an old gentleman has been giving halfpence to the children for no good purpose, and I thought you were of the same sort." After being asked again about Fanny's whereabouts, Baker said he had left her at the gate to play. The coroner asked Baker if he wanted to cross-question the witness, but he declined. The inquest concluded that Baker was responsible for the murder of Fanny Adams, and he was committed to Winchester gaol to await trial.

The trial took place at Winchester on 5 December. The defence contested Minnie's identification of Baker and claimed the knives found were too small for the crime. They also argued insanity: Baker's father had been violent, a cousin had been in asylums, his sister had died of a brain fever and he had attempted suicide after a love affair. The defence also argued that the diary entry was typical of the "epileptic or formal way of entry" that the defendant used and that the absence of a comma after the word "killed" did not render the entry a confession.

Justice Mellor invited the jury to consider a verdict of not responsible because of insanity, but they returned a guilty verdict after just fifteen minutes. On 24 December, Christmas Eve, Baker was hanged outside Winchester Prison. The crime had become notorious, and a crowd of 5,000 attended the execution. This was the last public execution held at that prison. Before his death, Baker wrote to the Adams family expressing his sorrow for what he had done "in an unguarded hour" and seeking their forgiveness. Following his execution, Baker's death mask was made, and the following year, his full figure was placed as an exhibit in the Chamber of Horrors at Madame Tussauds famous waxworks in London.

== Legacy ==
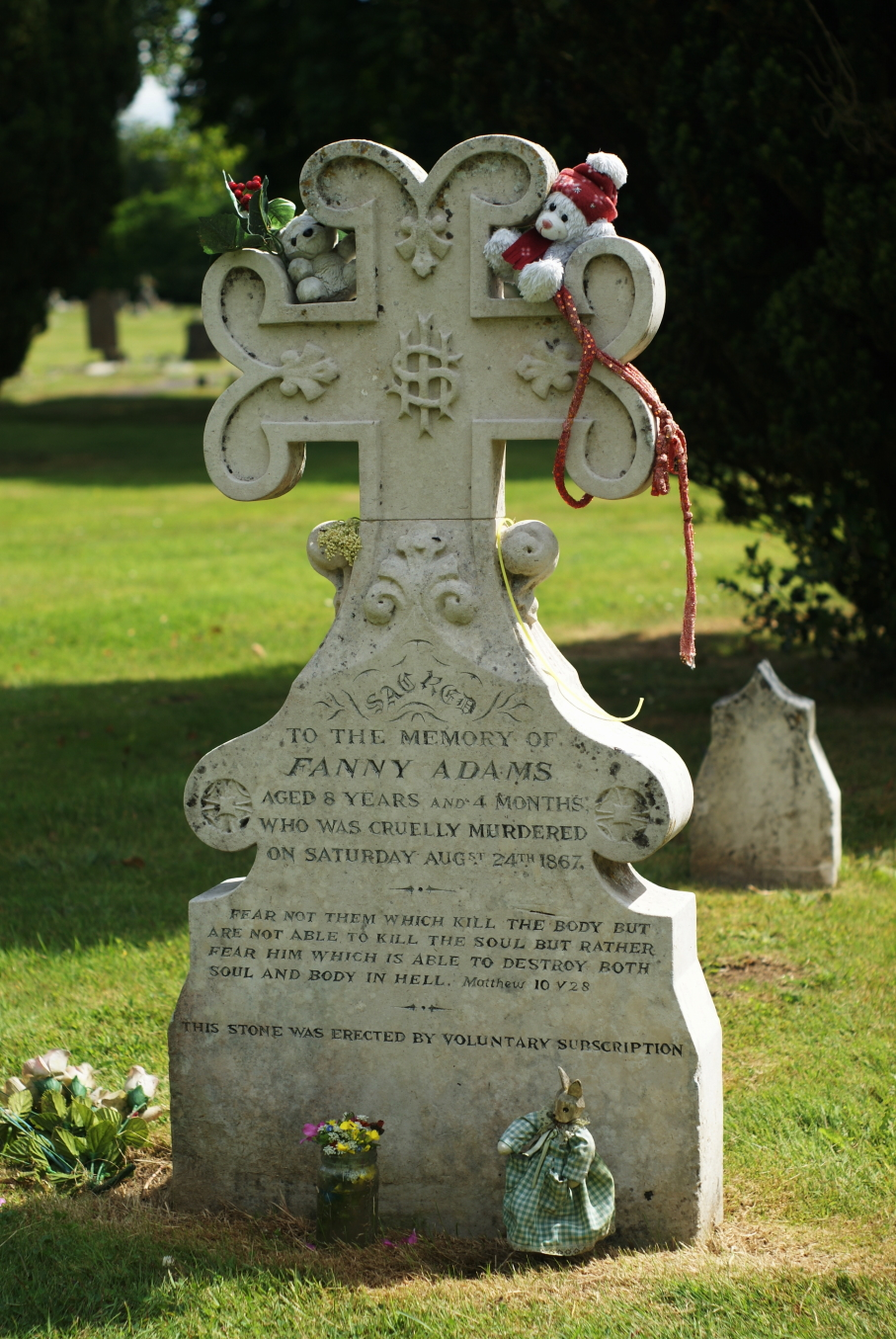
Fanny Adams' grave in Alton cemetery

Fanny was buried in Alton Cemetery. Her headstone was erected by voluntary subscription.

In 1869, new supplies of tinned mutton were introduced for British seamen. They were unimpressed with the meat and joked that it might be the butchered remains of Fanny Adams. "Fanny Adams" subsequently became slang for mediocre mutton, stew, scarce leftovers, and anything considered worthless. "Fanny" also became slang for the large tins in which the mutton was delivered and by extension for other mess tins or cooking pots. By the mid-20th century, "sweet Fanny Adams" had become a common minced oath or euphemistic alternative to the phrase "sweet fuck all."

== See also ==
- List of kidnappings

== Notes and references ==
Notes

Bibliography

- Cansfield, Peter (2004). The True Story of Fanny Adams (Second ed.). Soldridge: Peter Cansfield Associates. pp. 5–106. ISBN 978-0953634613.
- Green, David, ed. (2021). Trial of Frederick Baker. Notable British Trials. Mango Books. ISBN 978-1914277153.
