= HM Prison Winchester =

Category B prison in Winchester, Hampshire, England

Coordinates: 51.063°N 1.328°W

HMP Winchester
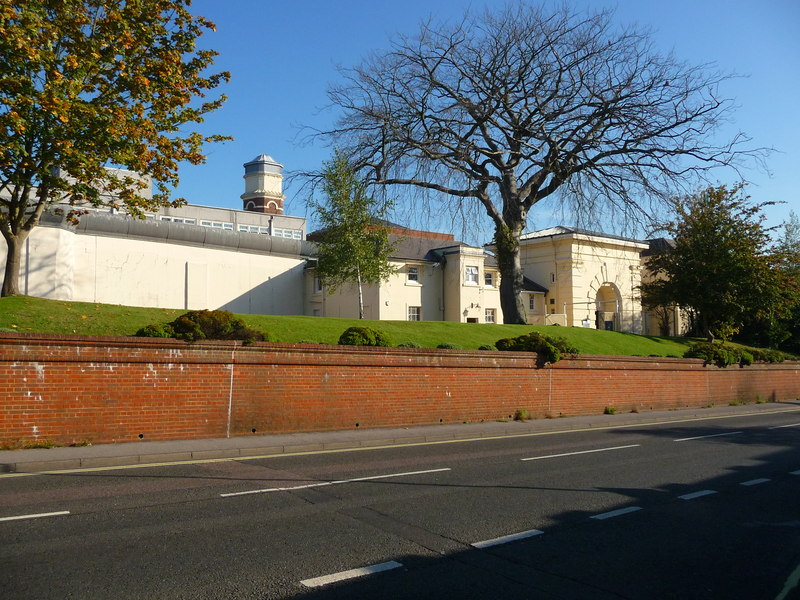
- HM Prison Winchester
- Interactive map of HMP Winchester
- Location: Winchester, Hampshire
- Security class: Adult Male/Category B
- Capacity: 706 (as of April 2013)
- Population: 685 (February 2014)
- Opened: 19th century
- Managed by: HM Prison Service
- Governor: Niall Bryant
- Website: Winchester at justice.gov.uk

HM Prison Winchester is a Category B men's prison, located in Winchester, Hampshire, England. The prison is operated by His Majesty's Prison Service.

== History ==
There has probably been a prison in Winchester, mainly known as Winchester gaol, since the thirteenth century.

A substantial part of the former County Gaol, rebuilt 1788 and 1803 of three storeys in Classical style, the predecessor of the present Winchester Prison and now converted to commercial use, survives in Jewry Street.

Winchester Prison was built between 1846 and 1850 to a Victorian radial design, with five 'spokes' radiating from a central hub carrying a turret prominent on the Winchester skyline. Four of these wings are now used for prisoner accommodation and one for administration. The prison occupies an elevated site in Romsey Road screened by a massive brick wall and bank. The central gatehouse was originally open to the street, but has been enclosed by the wall. The site contains the shell of the Victorian treadwheel house - a rare survivor.

In 1867, the public execution of the notorious murderer Frederick Baker - who abducted and dismembered eight-year-old Fanny Adams - drew a 5,000-strong crowd. This would become the last public hanging held outside the prison. Between 1900 and 1963, 16 male executions took place at the prison. The last was that of Dennis Whitty, convicted of capital murder at Cornwall Assizes, and hanged on 17 December 1963. The prison featured (as Wintoncester Prison) in Thomas Hardy's novel Tess of the D'Urbervilles as the site of Tess's execution although, in fact, no female has been executed at the present prison.

In 1995 serial killer Rosemary West, wife of Fred West, was held in Winchester on remand for the duration of her trial in Winchester Crown Court. Each day she was driven from her specially built unit within the male segregation block half a mile down the road to the court.

In December 2001, a convicted murderer William Todd escaped from Winchester Prison by scaling the wall. The prisoner went on the run after using a home-made handsaw to saw through the bars of his ground floor cell window. He then used a rope and grappling hook to scale the 30-feet wall of the prison. The prisoner was recaptured days later.

In August 2003, a Prison Reform Trust report stated that overcrowding at Winchester Prison was an ongoing problem. 54.7% of prisoners were sharing cells which were designed for one person. There had also been three suicides at the jail in the previous year.

In April 2005, an inspection report from His Majesty's Chief Inspector of Prisons stated that Winchester Prison was overcrowded and prisoners did not have enough work to do. The report also said that vulnerable inmates were not well protected and relations between staff and prisoners were not good. However, the report praised prisoner resettlement and improvements in healthcare at the jail.

The Inspectorate was still dissatisfied with Winchester at their inspection in 2010, stating that staff were unnecessarily rude and that prisoners spent too long in their cells with nothing to do. The team was especially critical of the discrimination that occurred between the West Hill annexe and the main prison in terms of employment and purposeful activity.

== The prison today ==
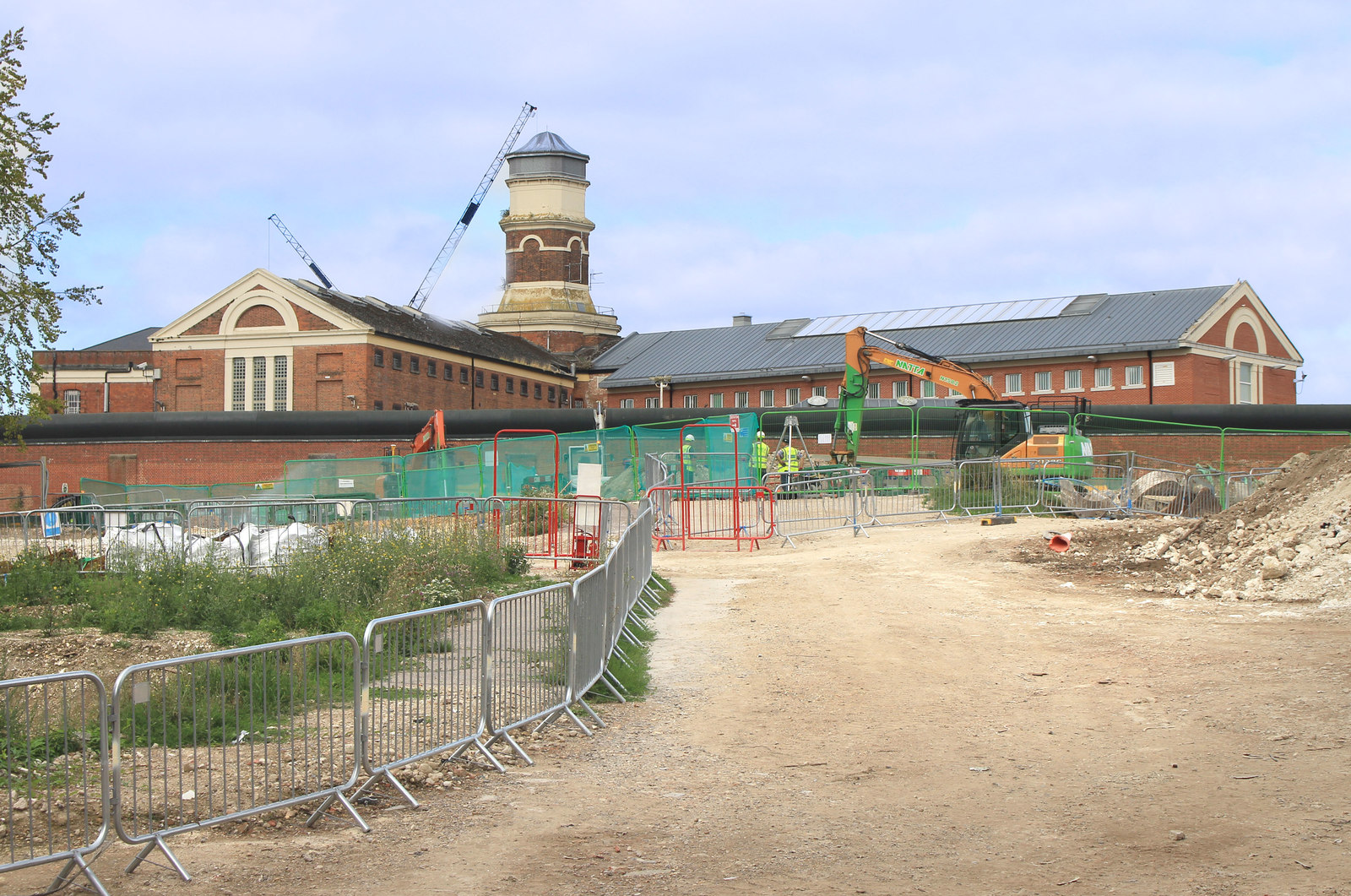
HMP Winchester viewed from neighbouring construction site in 2018

Winchester is a Category B prison for adult males which also houses young offenders aged over 18. The prison is currently undergoing major refurbishment with a build programme lasting 5 years. Work already completed includes changes to the health care, first night and detoxification centres, as well as a new electrical system, renewal of the fire and general alarms, a new visits complex and pedestrian access at the main gate. The rebuilding of C wing, that was suffering from age decay, was completed in 2008 and the first prisoners were moved into the new cells in October 2008.

The Prison has 4 wings. The first being "A" Wing that was supposed to house induction inmates for their first night but has since turned into a permanent wing. "B" Wing is the biggest wing which is mainly there for remanded prisoners. "C" wing is the drug detox wing and houses prisoners that are there with drug issues mainly. "D" is the vulnerable prisoner wing and houses prisoners that are a threat to themselves or in fear of attack from other prisoners. E wing is used for offices. There is a category C offshoot called "Westhill" which has 3 wings. "Alfred", "Temple" and "Wykeham". There is also a D Cat offshoot called "The Herne" which has 40 cells, all single.

By December 2010, the Prison offered a limited selection of Freeview channels to all cells.

The regime at HMP Winchester claims to deliver an average of 22 hours of purposeful activity per prisoner per week. However, this is regularly disputed by inspection reports and prisoners themselves.

Education at the prison is provided through Milton Keynes College, and is available irrespective of academic ability, but only limited courses are available to prisoners segregated under Prison Rule 45. Other facilities include a prison gym.

There have been many deaths in Winchester Prison. Daryl Hargrave aged 22 hanged himself in Winchester Prison on 19 July 2015, a day after another prisoner at the jail took his life. The inquest into Hargrave's death found adequate mental health care had not been provided, despite repeated warnings Hargrave was at risk of self harm. Hargrave had repeatedly self-harmed and attempted suicide and suffered mental health problems from a young age. In the days before his death Hargrave was clearly psychotic and told staff he planned to harm himself according to lawyers. The day before his suicide, Hargrave cut himself and told a nurse he was 'ground down by voices telling him to kill himself.' The nurse asked for him to be moved to an observation cell and put on constant watch. The prison's two observation cells were in use and Hargrave was instead put in a corner cell which one nurse described as the "worst place to put someone who was suicidal, as it was out of sight, out of mind". Consultant forensic psychiatrist, Dr Dinesh Maganty, said Hargrave showed clear evidence of psychosis and a GP or psychiatrist should have seen him urgently. Maganty said Hargrave should have received medication to help with anxiety and agitation due to his psychosis and criticised failure to provide it. The governor told the jury in 2015, just 41% of staff were sufficiently trained in suicide and self-harm prevention. This has now risen to 61% but progress was slow as because of 'resourcing issues' and the governor accepted this is not good enough. A coroner found neglect contributed to Daryl Hargrave's death. A prison inspection found the prison was "insufficiently safe" and anti-bullying measures were ineffective.

Many prisoners spend just 45 minutes a day out of their cells. There is weak support for prisoners at risk of self harm and there have been five suicides since the last inspection in 2014. New prisoners are reasonably well treated, initiatives to prevent violence are good and the prison is making progress in many areas. However limits to time out of cells reduces the good the prison can do. After a prisoner took his own life in September 2016 there were complaints over lack of suicide prevention training among the staff.

== Notable inmates ==
- All but one of the Richmond Sixteen, First World War "absolutist" conscientious objectors
- Peter Wildeblood
- Dennis Whitty
- Basil Bunting
- Keith Mann
- Rosemary West
- Bob Higgins: Former football coach with Southampton F.C. Implicated in the 2016 United Kingdom football sexual abuse scandal - held on remand at HMP Winchester until sentencing. Currently imprisoned at HMP Wakefield in Yorkshire.
- Tommy Robinson
- Vickrum Singh Digwa
- Danny Tommo

== In popular culture ==
- The prison featured (as Wintoncester Prison) in Thomas Hardy's novel Tess of the D'Urbervilles
- The prison appeared in the 2019 Channel 4 programme Crime and Punishment
