= Itchen Abbas railway station =

Former railway station in England

Itchen Abbas
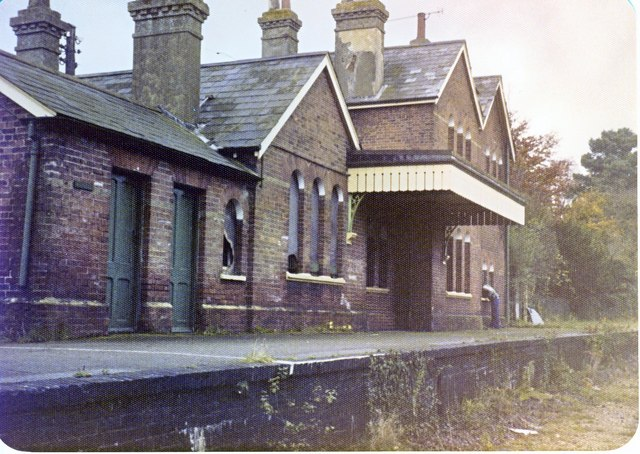

General information
- Location: Itchen Abbas, City of Winchester, Hampshire; England
- Coordinates: 51.09446°N 1.24001°W
- Platforms: originally 2(but later 1)

Other information
- Status: Disused

History
- Original company: Alton, Alresford and Winchester Railway
- Pre-grouping: London and South Western Railway
- Post-grouping: Southern Railway; Southern Region of British Railways

Key dates
- 2 October 1865: Station opened
- 5 February 1973: Station closed
Location

The Itchen Abbas railway station was in the county of Hampshire in England and opened on 2 October 1865 by the Mid-Hants Railway. It closed on 5 February 1973.

== History ==
The station was originally built with two platforms but, in the 1930s, the up platform was taken out of use and only a single track serving the down platform was used. The station was destaffed in 1967.

Following the closure of the route between Alton and Winchester, the line from Alresford eastwards to Alton was reopened in preservation by the Watercress Line, but not the section west of Alresford (including Itchen Abbas). It is unlikely the line will ever be re-opened to Winchester because the M3 and five houses have been built at various points on its route. At the beginning of the 1980s, the original station building was demolished and a new house built on the site, where parts of the platform still stand in its garden.

To the east, between the station site and Alresford, is the now disused but complete viaduct over Northington Road.

== Route ==
Preceding station	Disused railways	Following station
Alresford; Line closed, station open	London and South Western Railway; Alton, Alresford and Winchester Railway	Winchester; Line closed, station open
