= Medstead and Four Marks railway station =

Former railway station in England

Medstead and Four Marks
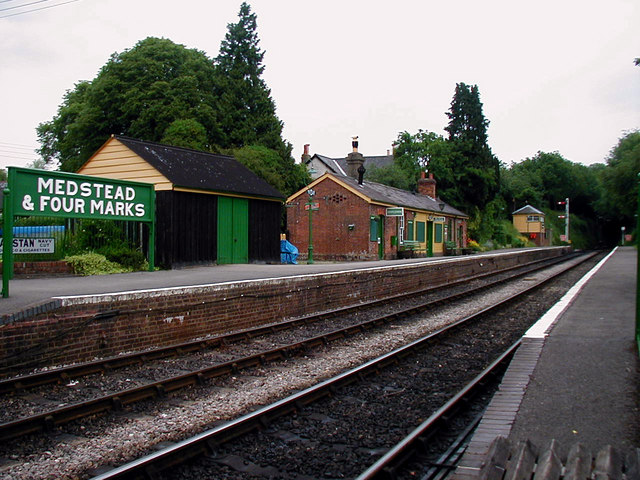

General information
- Location: Four Marks, Hampshire, East Hampshire; England
- Coordinates: 51.1131°N 1.0471°W
- Grid reference: SU668353
- System: Station on heritage railway
- Platforms: 2

History
- Original company: Alton, Alresford and Winchester Railway
- Pre-grouping: London and South Western Railway
- Post-grouping: Southern Railway; Southern Region of British Railways

Key dates
- August 1868: Station opened
- 5 February 1973: Station closed
- 28 May 1983: Station reopened
Location

Medstead and Four Marks railway station is a railway station in the English county of Hampshire, serving the villages of Medstead and Four Marks. At 644 ft (or exactly 196.2912 m) above sea level, it is currently (2016) the highest operational standard-gauge railway station in Southern England.

== History ==
Opened in August 1868 as Medstead, it changed to its present name on 1 October 1937. The passing loop was removed, signal box closed and station destaffed in January 1967. It closed in 1973.

== Preservation ==
It was reopened on 28 May 1983 by the preserved Watercress Line, which runs from Alton to New Alresford. The footbridge (currently on the country end) is from Cowes railway station on the Isle of Wight. The signal box came from Wilton South. Beside the station is the Signal and Telegraph department, which also houses the Permanent Way Gang and the Building Department.

== Route ==
Preceding station	Heritage railways	Following station
Ropley towards Alresford	Watercress Line	Alton Terminus
Historical railways
Ropley	Alton, Alresford and Winchester Railway	Alton
