= Ropley railway station =

Heritage railway station in England

Ropley
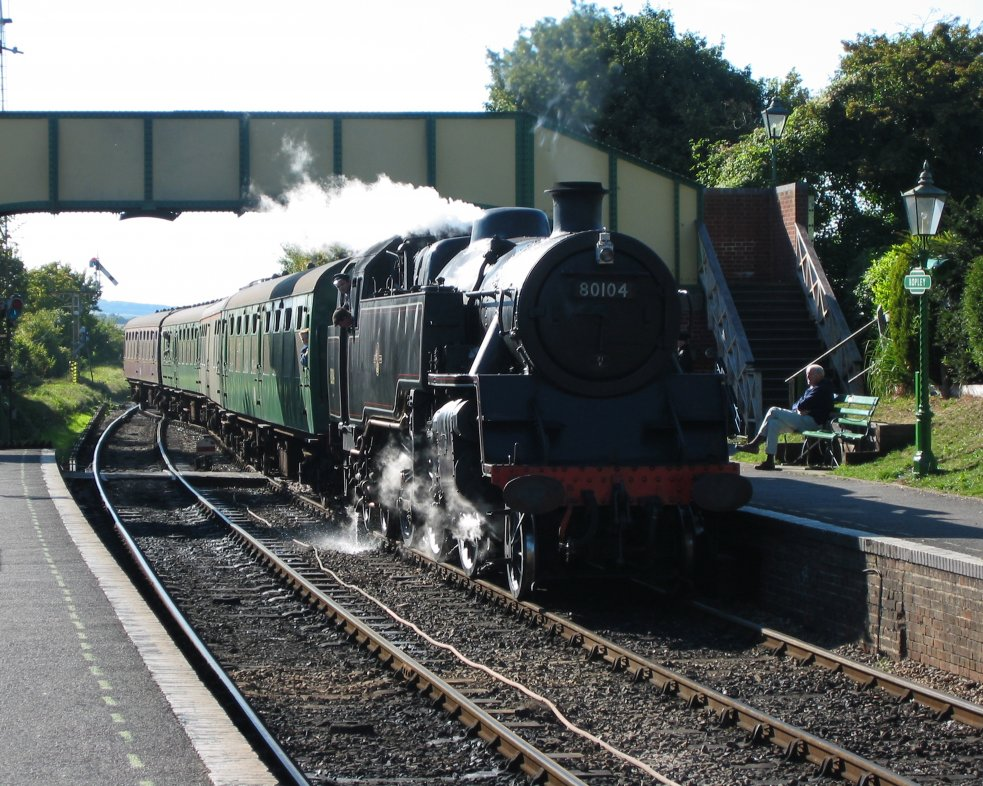
- Engine 80104 approaching Ropley station on The Watercress Line

General information
- Location: Ropley, East Hampshire; England
- Coordinates: 51.0876°N 1.1024°W
- Grid reference: SU629324
- System: Station on heritage railway
- Platforms: 2

History
- Original company: Alton, Alresford and Winchester Railway
- Pre-grouping: London and South Western Railway
- Post-grouping: Southern Railway; Southern Region of British Railways

Key dates
- 2 October 1865: Opened
- 5 February 1973: Closed
- 30 April 1977: Reopened
Location

Ropley railway station is a railway station in Ropley, Hampshire, England, which opened in 1865 and reopened in 1977 after four years' closure, to be served by steam and select diesel trains on the Watercress Line which shares its terminus at Alton railway station along with the more major Alton Line.

== History ==
The station was opened by the Mid-Hants (Alton Lines) Railway (MHR) on 2 October 1865. The MHR was leased to the London and South Western Railway (LSWR) in August 1880, which fully absorbed the MHR in June 1884. The LSWR amalgamated with other railways to form the Southern Railway on 1 January 1923.

The station was destaffed in 1967 and closed by British Rail on 5 February 1973.

== Preservation ==
Ropley railway station was reopened by the Mid Hants Railway (Watercress Line) on 30 April 1977. It is an intermediate station on the 10-mile (16 km), four-station route which runs from Alton to New Alresford, also in Hampshire.

The main locomotive shed and workshops for the Mid Hants Railway are just to the east of Ropley station.

The station gardens feature notable yew topiary, which has been in situ for over 100 years (an 1898 postcard shows the topiary well established).

A footbridge was added to the western end of the station in 1986. This was recovered from the closed station at North Tawton in Devon in August 1983, restored and installed by volunteers.

A 10 1/4 in (260 mm) gauge miniature railway opened in 2015. This railway was previously running in the Top Car Park of Ropley station from 2009 until 2012.

=== Footbridge ===
In 2012–13, a footbridge, originally at King's Cross station in London, was dismantled to connect instead the raised picnic area, orchard and children's play areas to the buildings at Ropley station taking in for part of its length the maintenance shed, where passengers can walk over and view the works below.

== Route ==
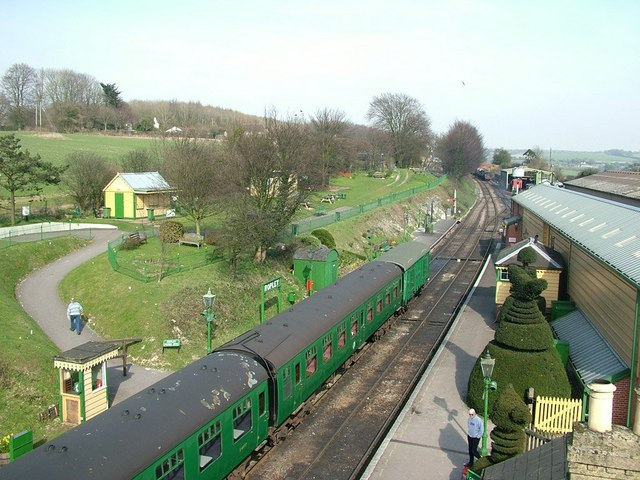
View of station and green play, picnic etc. areas from footbridge with green carriages in the far platform .

Preceding station	Heritage railways	Following station
Alresford Terminus	Watercress Line	Medstead and Four Marks towards Alton
Historical railways
Alresford	Alton, Alresford and Winchester Railway	Medstead and Four Marks
