= Farringdon railway station (disambiguation) =

Farringdon railway station may refer to:

- Farringdon station, a main line and London Underground station
- Farringdon Halt railway station, a station on the closed Meon Valley Railway in East Hampshire

It may also be confused with:

- Faringdon railway station, a closed Great Western Railway station in Oxfordshire
- Farington railway station, a closed station on the former North Union Railway in Lancashire
