= Winchester railway station =

Railway station in Hampshire, England

Coordinates: 51.067°N 1.320°W

Winchester
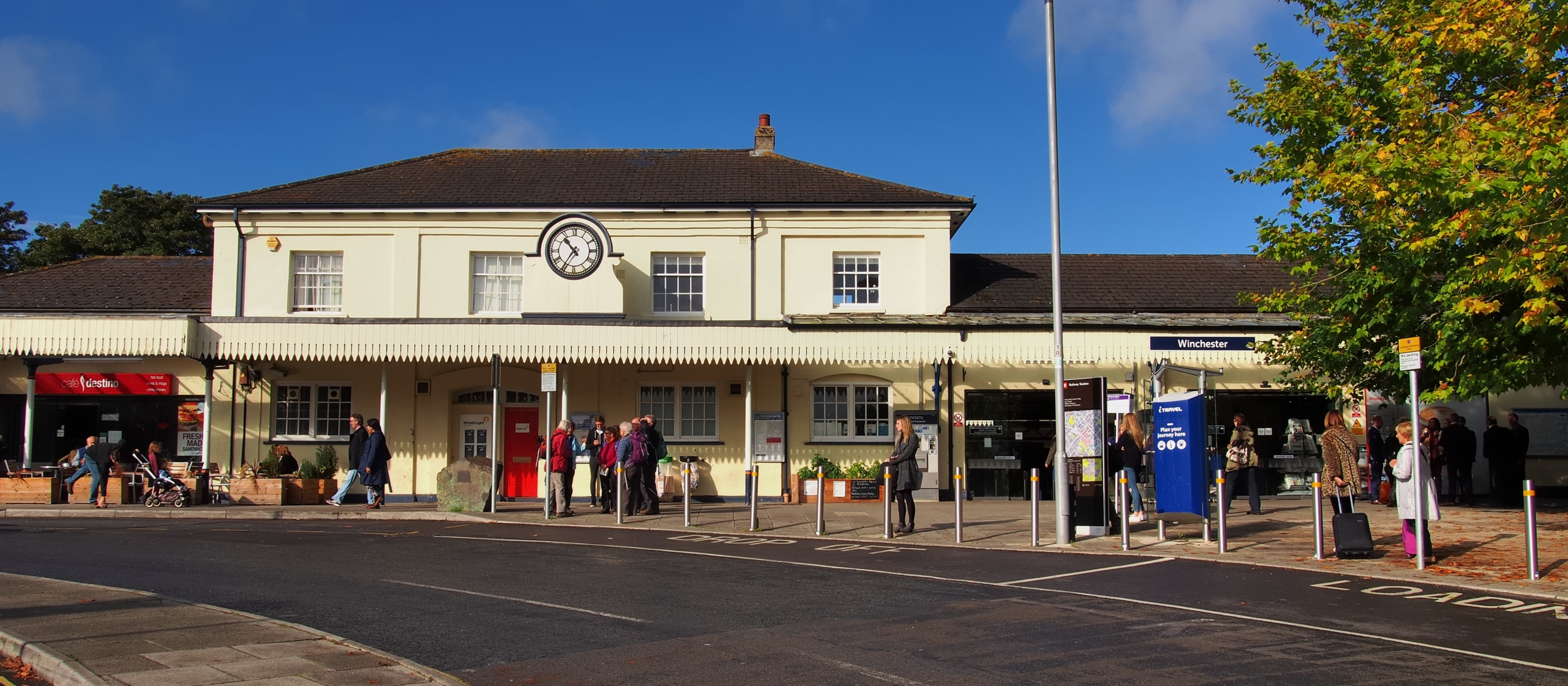
- Station frontage in 2016

General information
- Location: Winchester, City of Winchester; England
- Grid reference: SU477300
- Managed by: South Western Railway
- Platforms: 2

Other information
- Station code: WIN
- Classification: DfT category C1

History
- Opened: 10 June 1839

Passengers
- 2020/21: ▼1.111 million
- 2021/22: ▲2.960 million
- Interchange: 38,476
- 2022/23: ▲3.724 million
- Interchange: ▲81,031
- 2023/24: ▲4.210 million
- Interchange: ▲82,166
- 2024/25: ▲4.594 million
- Interchange: ▲97,244
Location
Notes
- Passenger statistics from the Office of Rail and Road

Winchester railway station serves the city of Winchester, in the county of Hampshire, England. It is a stop on the South West Main Line and was known as Winchester City from 1949–67, to distinguish it from Winchester (Chesil) station. It is 66 miles 39 chains (107.0 km) down the line from London Waterloo.

Despite its prominence, the station only has two platforms. One is on the western side, with the line running in a northerly direction via Basingstoke, Woking and Clapham Junction, towards the terminal at Waterloo. The other is on the eastern side, with the line running in a southerly direction, towards Eastleigh, where it splits and runs towards Southampton Central, Bournemouth and Weymouth or Portsmouth Harbour.

== History ==
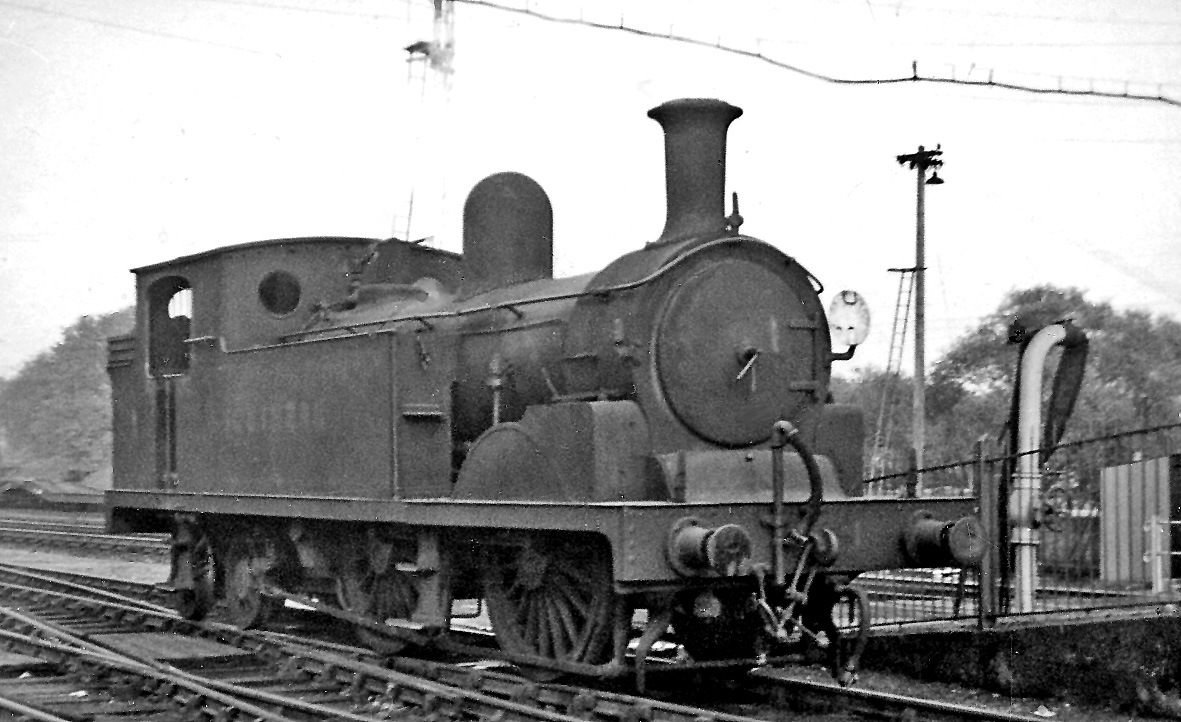
Unique SR locomotive at the station in 1947

The station was opened on 10 June 1839 by the London and Southampton Railway (later the London and South Western Railway). It became a temporary terminus for the Winchester to Southampton section. On the same day, another station was opened at Basingstoke, which was a temporary terminus of the London to Basingstoke section.

In the following year, a line was built joining Winchester and Basingstoke and the line was complete. This line was the trickiest to construct; it had four tunnels and a single station called Andover Road (now Micheldever), rather optimistically given that Andover lay 13 miles (21 km) west. Winchester became a through station on 30 March 1840.

As the line bypassed Kingston upon Thames, Winchester was the only major settlement on the line between London and Southampton. Since the original Southampton line ran via the then small market town of Basingstoke, where lines to the west would be built, it was not very direct. Another line was constructed to run via Guildford, Farnham and Alton, which joined the main line north of Winchester. The present day line runs via Aldershot instead of Guildford, and the line finishes at Alton. British Rail closed the line from Alton to Winchester in 1973, but a section from Alton to Alresford is preserved as the Watercress Line. The final gap from Alresford to Winchester is unlikely ever to be reinstated, owing to housing and the M3 having been built on the former trackbed.

Later, the Great Western Railway built the Didcot, Newbury and Southampton Railway. This passed at a separate station on the eastern side of Winchester, called Winchester Cheesehill; in 1949, it was renamed Winchester (Chesil), whilst Winchester's main station was renamed Winchester City. This did not last long; in 1966, Chesil closed and an alternative diversionary route to Oxford, Birmingham and beyond, bypassing Basingstoke and Reading, was consequently lost. The following year, British Rail changed the station name from Winchester City to Winchester.

Renovations in summer 2004 gave the western side of the station a refurbished entrance and second ticket office, albeit with shorter opening hours than that on the eastern side.

In summer 2009, both platforms received ticket barriers with CCTV, with the entrance to platform 2 from the forecourt reorganised as part of South West Trains' plan to fit or refit ticket barriers on the busiest stations on the network.

In July 2013, a brand new footbridge was constructed between the platforms and also features lifts.

=== Romsey Rail Link ===
There was a rail-bus link, operated on behalf of South West Trains, that was known as the Romsey Rail Link service. It followed the same route as the X66, linking the station with Romsey via Hursley and Ampfield but with limited stops. Guards were equipped with rail ticket machines and were able to issue tickets for the entire rail network as well as weekly season tickets, thereby saving passengers the necessity of queuing at the station ticket office.

The service ceased on 28 July 2008 when South West Trains withdrew its subsidy, citing lack of use, despite a protest group having formed and collecting a petition of over 1,000 signatures to oppose the closure.

As part of the superseded X66 timetable, Stagecoach South continue to operate two of the early morning peak services, which were well used alongside the existing hourly services (now half-hourly on weekdays) but without the facility to purchase rail tickets on the buses. The route (now known simply as Route 66) has been extended with variants through the day, and increased journey times, to serve Romsey's outlying housing estates at Woodley, Cupernham and Abbotswood.

=== Accidents and incidents ===
In 1937, a boat train caught fire due to an electrical defect in one of the carriages. Four carriages were destroyed.

=== Goods yard and motive power depot ===
A small engine shed was built by the Southern Railway in 1927. This housed a shunting locomotive which worked in the local goods yard. It was closed in 1963, together with the goods yard. There were formerly extensive sidings on both sides of the station and a coal yard, all now largely converted to car parks. On the eastern side, in the area now occupied by retail units, there was a cattle dock for livestock arriving by rail for the adjacent Winchester Cattle Market in Andover Road.

== Services ==
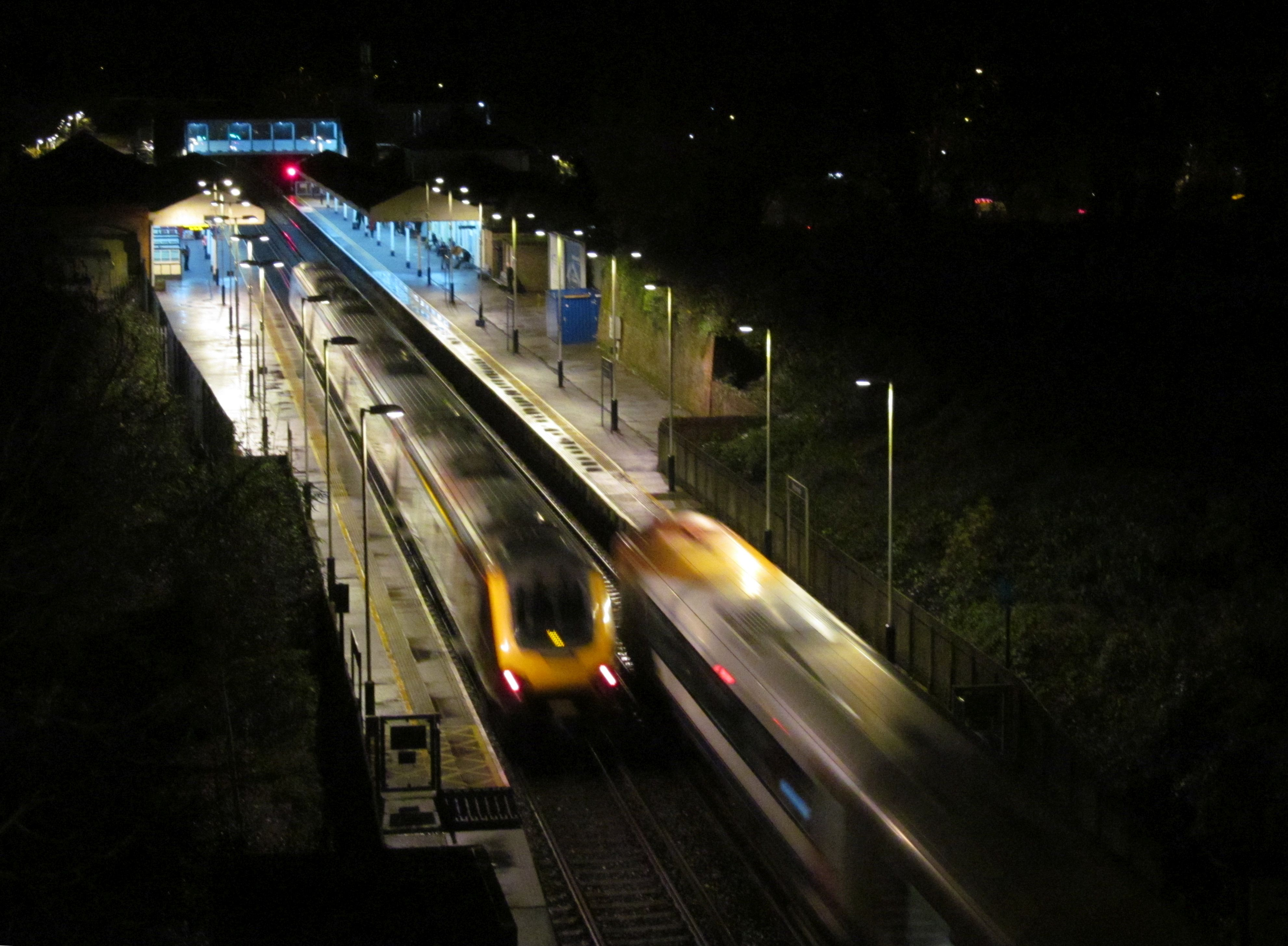
The station at night: a CrossCountry service to York passes a South West Trains service to Weymouth

The station is served by two train operating companies:

- South Western Railway provides three trains per hour to London Waterloo, with the fastest taking 61 minutes. Southbound, there is one train per hour to Weymouth, one to Portsmouth Harbour and one to Poole. There is also an hourly local service to Southampton Central that starts from here.
- CrossCountry services between Bournemouth and Manchester Piccadilly, via Reading and Birmingham New Street, call hourly in each direction.

Preceding station	National Rail	Following station
Basingstoke	CrossCountry; Bournemouth-Manchester	Southampton Airport Parkway
Woking or Basingstoke	South Western Railway; London-Weymouth express services	Southampton Airport Parkway or Eastleigh
Basingstoke	South Western Railway; London-Weymouth semi-fast services	Southampton Airport Parkway
Basingstoke or Micheldever or Terminus	South Western Railway; London-Poole/Winchester-Bournemouth stopping services	Shawford
Micheldever	South Western Railway; London-Portsmouth via Winchester stopping services	Eastleigh
	Disused railways	
Itchen Abbas; Line and station closed	London and South Western Railway; Alton, Alresford and Winchester Railway	Terminus
