= Alresford railway station =

Alresford railway station may refer to:

- Alresford railway station (Essex), England
- Alresford railway station (Hampshire), England - a preserved railway station on the Mid-Hants Railway
