= Aldershot and Alton lines of the LSWR =

Railway lines serving Aldershot and Alton, in England

The Aldershot and Alton lines of the LSWR (the London and South Western Railway) were railways developed from 1849 onwards in the region in Surrey and Hampshire, England, between the Southampton main line and Guildford. First was a line from Guildford to Farnham, soon extended to Alton in 1852. The Reading, Guildford and Reigate Railway, an affiliate of the South Eastern Railway (SER), used part of that line by running powers. When the Aldershot Garrison and associated camps opened, suddenly Aldershot had a large population, both civilian and military, and the LSWR built a line from Pirbright Junction, on the Southampton main line. As well as serving Aldershot, this line gave a more direct route from London. It opened in 1870.

It was complemented by a short curve near Ash enabling trains from Guildford to reach Aldershot, opening in 1879. This formed an Aldershot loop that by-passed part of the original line, from Ash Junction through Tongham to Farnham Junction. Although the Tongham section retained a train service, the Aldershot route became dominant. In 1937 many of the lines in the area were electrified, but the Tongham section was closed to passenger traffic. Three routes extended from the west end of Alton station, the first being the Mid-Hants Railway in 1865. All three were conceived as important trunk routes and none fulfilled that potential. All were closed, the last closing in 1973.

The electrified network, Guildford via Aldershot to Farnham and Alton, and Pirbright Junction to Aldershot and Farnham Junction, continue in busy passenger use at the present day, together with a diesel passenger service over the Guildford to Reading route, which uses the original SER running powers section from Ash Junction to Aldershot South Junction.

== History ==
=== First railways ===
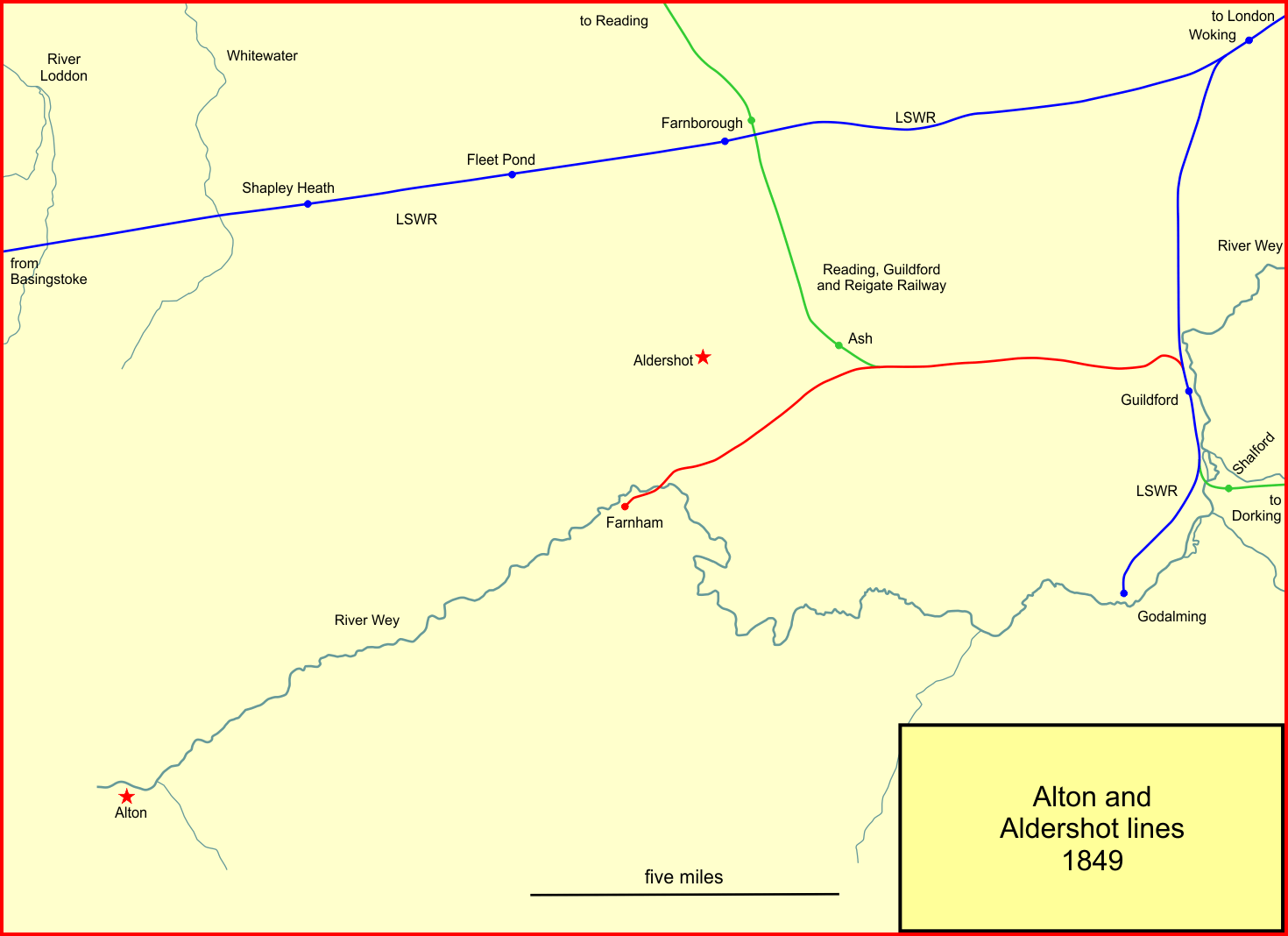
The early stage of the Aldershot and Alton lines of the LSWR in 1849

The London and Southampton Railway opened its main line throughout in 1839. The company changed its name to London and South Western Railway (LSWR) in 1840. In 1845 a branch line to Guildford from Woking was opened, and it was extended to Godalming in 1849. To the west of Guildford lay Farnham and Alton, both important in the brewing industry, and transporting their product to London and other population centres by road to the railhead at Winchfield, and a branch line to serve that traffic was an attractive proposition. In addition there was potential for useful quarrying at Alton if a railway connection were provided.

=== Guildford to Alton authorised, and opened ===
London and South Western Railway (Farnham and Alton Branch) Act 1846
- Act of Parliament
- Parliament of the United Kingdom
- Long title: An Act to enable the London and South-western Railway Company to make a Branch Railway to Farnham in the County of Surrey and Alton in the County of Southampton.
- Citation: 9 & 10 Vict. c. clxxiii

Dates
- Royal assent: 16 July 1846

An authorising act of Parliament, the London and South Western Railway (Farnham and Alton Branch) Act 1846 (9 & 10 Vict. c. clxxiii) was given on 16 July 1846. The LSWR had proposed two lines; one from the main line at Pirbright and the other from Guildford. The two routes would converge at Ash Green and continue to Alton. However Parliament authorised only the second, for the 19 mile line from Guildford through Wanborough, Ash, Tongham, Bentley and Froyle to Alton. The estimated cost was £300,000. The Reading, Guildford and Reigate Railway was also authorised on the same day (16 July 1846), and it was given running powers over the LSWR line, between Shalford Junction, south of Guildford, through Guildford and as far as Ash.

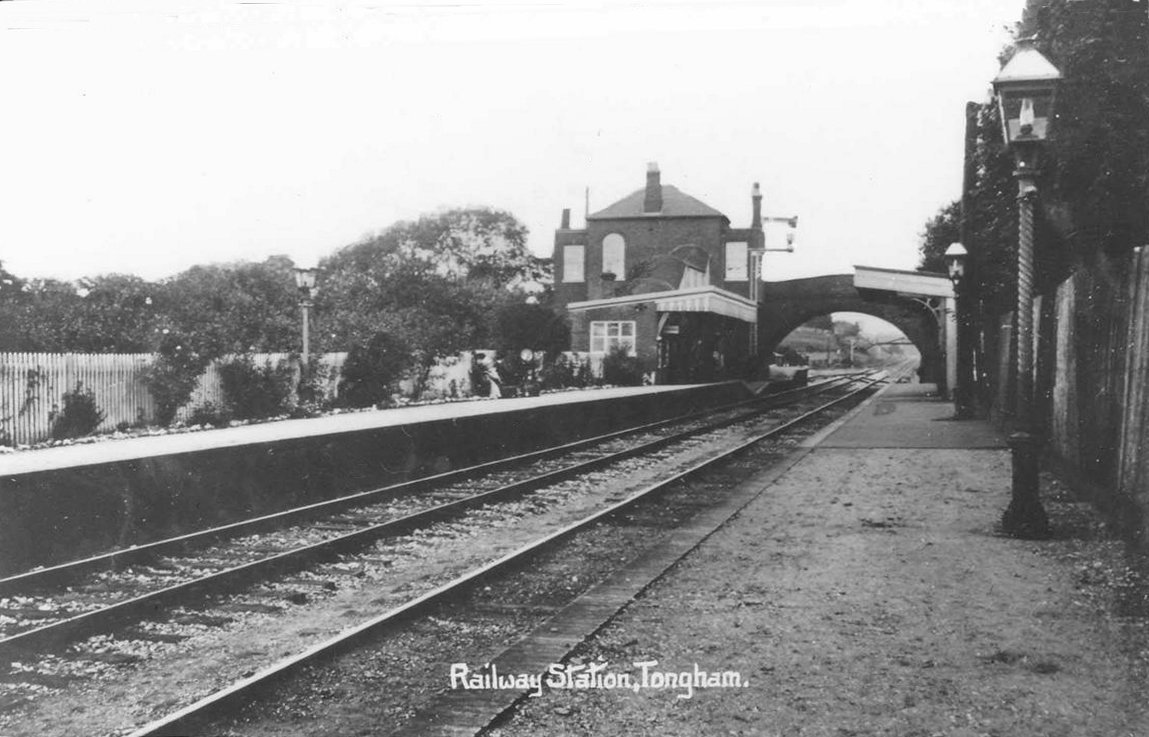
Tongham railway station, looking north-east

The engineer was Joseph Locke and Thomas Brassey was awarded the contract for construction, for the sum of £143,667. There were no major engineering works on the route, although considerable embankment and cutting work was necessary. The financial recession in October 1847 slowed the progress of the work. The line opened on 20 August 1849 from Guildford as far as Ash Junction, for the Reading, Guildford and Reigate trains, and on 8 October 1849 from there on to Farnham. It was a double line from Guildford to Ash Junction, and then single for the rest of the route. At this stage Alton was not attempted.

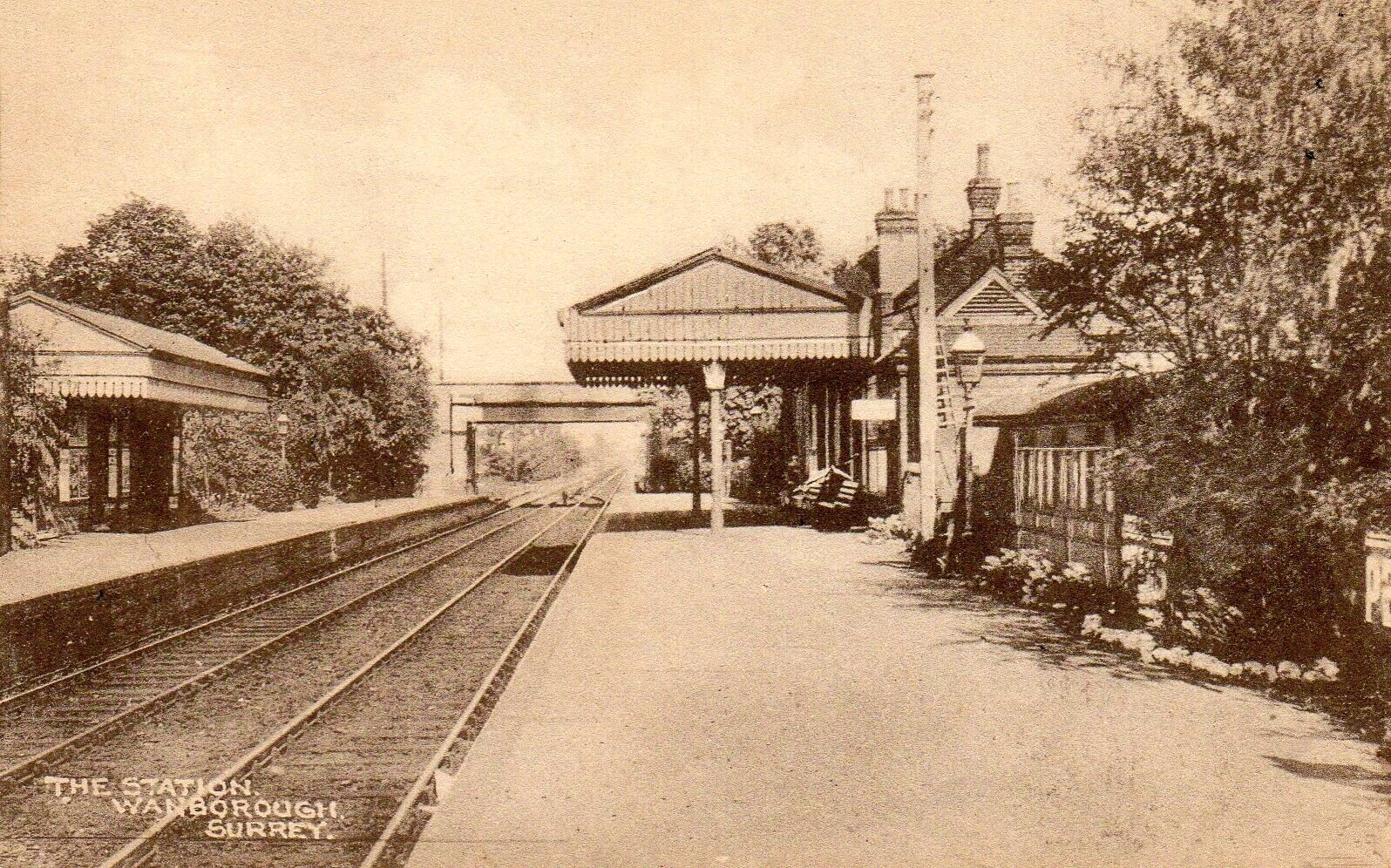
Wanborough railway station

Parliament granted a two-year extension for completion of the line (to Alton) in the London and South Western Railway (Extension of Powers) Act 1849 (12 & 13 Vict. c. xxxiii) on 26 June 1849, but shareholders at a general meeting on 25 October 1850 demanded cessation of work in the prevailing financial climate. Brassey had agreed to reduce his price, and by making these last nine miles, from Farnham to Alton, single for £3,500 per mile, the cost of the whole line would be only £30,000 above that to abandon them. Against vocal opposition, the meeting authorised the work, and the completed single line opened on 28 July 1852 between Farnham and Alton.

=== South Eastern Railway running powers ===
Reading, Guildford and Reigate Railway (Connection with London and South Western Railway) Act 1849
- Act of Parliament
- Parliament of the United Kingdom
- Long title: An Act for making a short Railway to connect the Line of the Reading, Guildford, and Reigate Railway with the Line of the London and South-western Railway; and for other purposes.
- Citation: 12 & 13 Vict. c. xxviii

Dates
- Royal assent: 26 June 1849

Text of statute as originally enacted

The LSWR was not opposed to the connection with the Reading, Guildford and Reigate Railway, when the running powers were inserted into the Reading, Guildford and Reigate Railway (Connection with London and South Western Railway) Act 1849 (12 & 13 Vict. c. xxviii), as the LSWR hoped that some traffic to and from Reading would come to it. In addition it might get access via Reigate to areas in the south-east of England. The RG&RR was worked by the South Eastern Railway (SER), and was absorbed by it in 1852.

The SER started operating from Redhill to Shalford on 20 August 1849. On the same day the SER started operation from Reading to Guildford. The LSWR Godalming extension, on which the SER was to rely between Shalford and Guildford, was not yet ready. It opened on 15 October 1849.

The South Eastern Railway proved a difficult business partner. As its route to London was extremely roundabout, it reduced its fares considerably, and for a time a damaging rate cutting war took place. In 1858 a pooling arrangement was agreed.

=== The military at Aldershot, and a new line ===
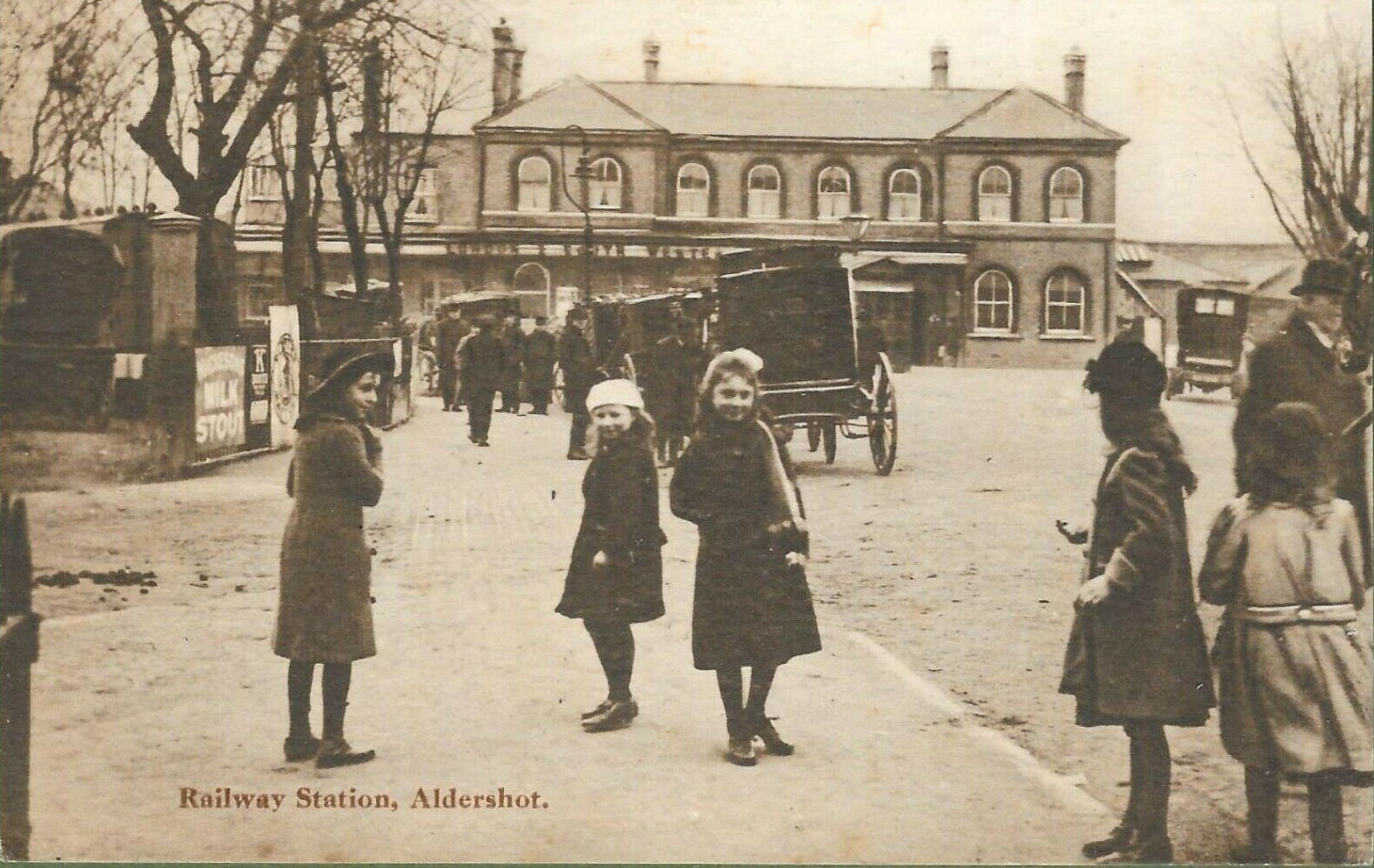
Frontage of Aldershot station

Developments on the Guildford to Alton line were slow. The major army base at Aldershot was established from 1854 and for a time Ash Green station handled the arrival of construction materials, until a private siding was made for the purpose at Tongham. The track between Ash Green and Tongham was doubled some time after August 1855, because of the military construction. The second track was a long siding from Ash Green at first. Official records say that the second line opened between Ash Green and Farnham Junction on 4 June 1884. The second line between Farnham Junction and Farnham station opened on 2 May 1870.

The town of Aldershot had a population of 875 in 1851, but the military establishment caused a massive increase in the civilian population in addition to the troops: in the 1861 census there were 7,755 civilians and 8,965 military personnel recorded in Aldershot. Yet the town and the army garrison were isolated, two miles from Tongham station. A number of proposals for a branch line had not gained any traction, and the LSWR was seen as dilatory in the matter. An independent scheme was developed locally and a Farnham, Aldershot and Woking Junction Bill was prepared, to build a line from Farnham to Pirbright on the LSWR Southampton main line, passing through the centre of Aldershot on the way. This was to be presented to Parliament in 1864.

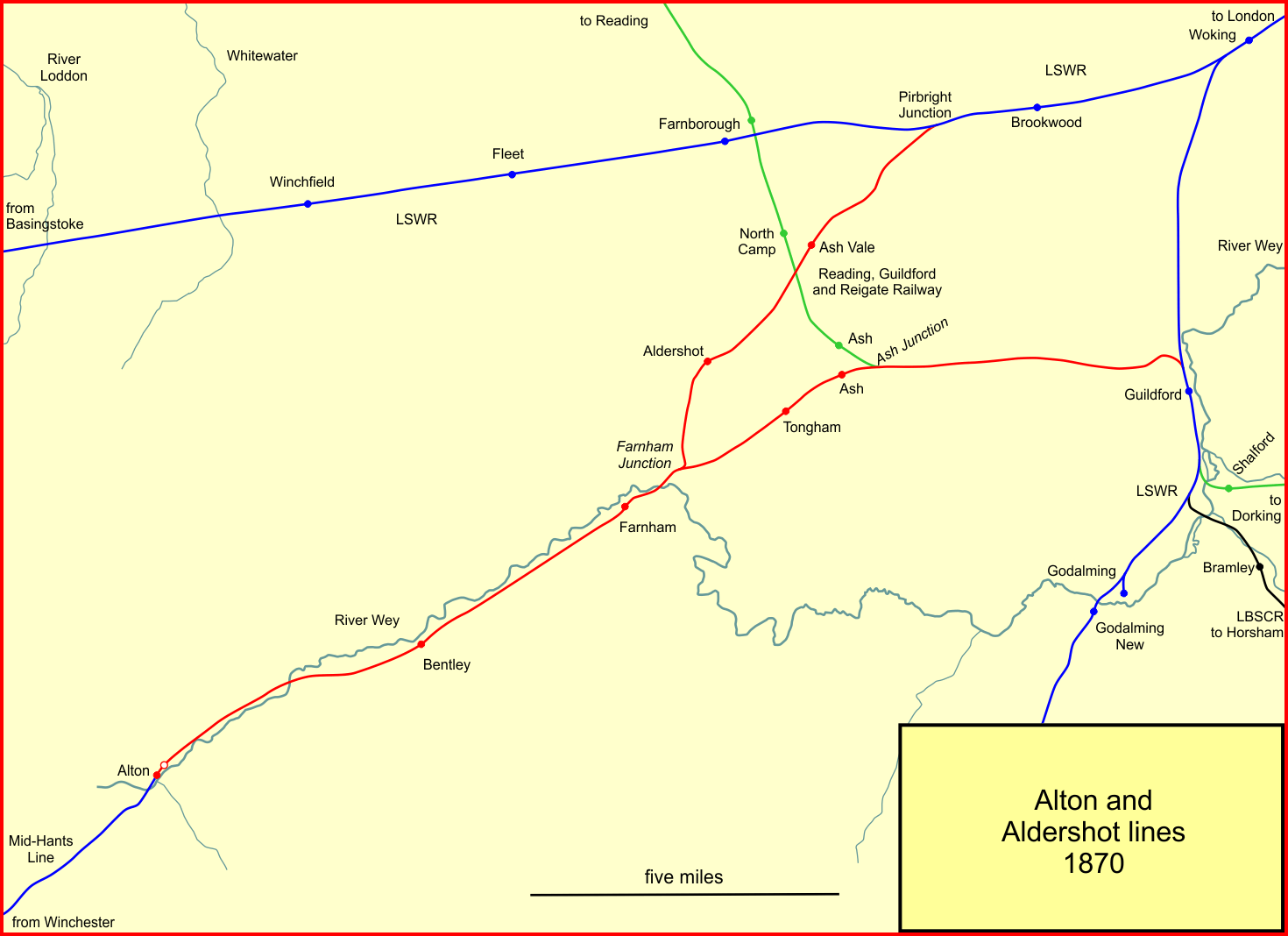
The Aldershot and Alton lines of the LSWR in 1870

The LSWR was now alarmed at the idea of an independent line, especially as it was to make junctions along its route with the South Eastern Railway at North Camp and also near Ash: if running powers were granted over the LSWR main line, this could give the SER access to large parts of the LSWR system. The LSWR persuaded the promoters to withdraw their bill; the LSWR would pay their expenses and promised to present its own bill for a similar line in the following session.

South-western (Aldershot) Railway Act 1865
- Act of Parliament
- Parliament of the United Kingdom
- Long title: An Act for authorizing the London and South-western Railway Company to make and maintain a Railway from their Main Line of Railway at Pirbright by Aldershot to Farnham; and for other Purposes.
- Citation: 28 & 29 Vict. c. ciii

Dates
- Royal assent: 19 June 1865

Text of statute as originally enacted

This they did and the South-western (Aldershot) Railway Act 1865 (28 & 29 Vict. c. ciii) was passed on 19 June 1865; authorised share capital was £160,000. The line was referred to as the Farnham, Aldershot and Pirbright Junction branch. The spur to North Camp SER was omitted, but a short curve to Ash on the SER was substituted, giving access from Aldershot towards Guildford; however it was not built for some years. A flying junction for up trains to cross the LSWR main line at Pirbright Junction was included in the authorisation, but it was not built as part of the works. It was later provided in connection with the main line widening, on 30 June 1901.

The line was 8 1/4 miles long, and during construction suffered a number of earthslips during extremely difficult weather. Col. Yolland inspected it on 22 April 1870 and it opened on 2 May 1870. There were stations at North Camp and Ash Vale, (Note: North Camp & North Vale station was later named Ash Vale; North Camp is a separate station now.) and Aldershot. In the early years arriving passengers at Aldershot could be taken to any part of the town by omnibus for sixpence.

It was built as a double track from Pirbright Junction to Aldershot, and single from there to Farnham Junction, where it converged with the Tongham line. This formed a significant bottleneck as traffic developed, and on 10 March 1875 the line from Aldershot to Farnham Junction was doubled. The War Department built siding connections into the army camp, operational from 1890; a junction on the LSWR line was built specially.

The South-western (Aldershot) Railway Act 1865 authorising the Aldershot line had authorised a curve to Ash connecting the Aldershot line to the SER line and the SER had running powers to Aldershot station. The spur was built in 1879 and on 1 May 1879 the SER then started to exercise the powers to Aldershot. A bay platform was provided for them at Aldershot. The SER ran eleven weekday and five Sunday trains each way, and improbably advertised them as “direct to the West End, Charing Cross and the City (Cannon Street)... fast trains performing the journey in about 80 minutes'. The LSWR had been given reciprocal powers from Aldershot South Junction (the apex of the curve nearer Guildford) and North Camp, but it never used them. From the opening of the Ash curve, the LSWR diverted most passenger trains away from the Tongham line so as to serve Aldershot, using the running powers form Ash Junction to Aldershot South Junction.

=== Developments from 1878 ===
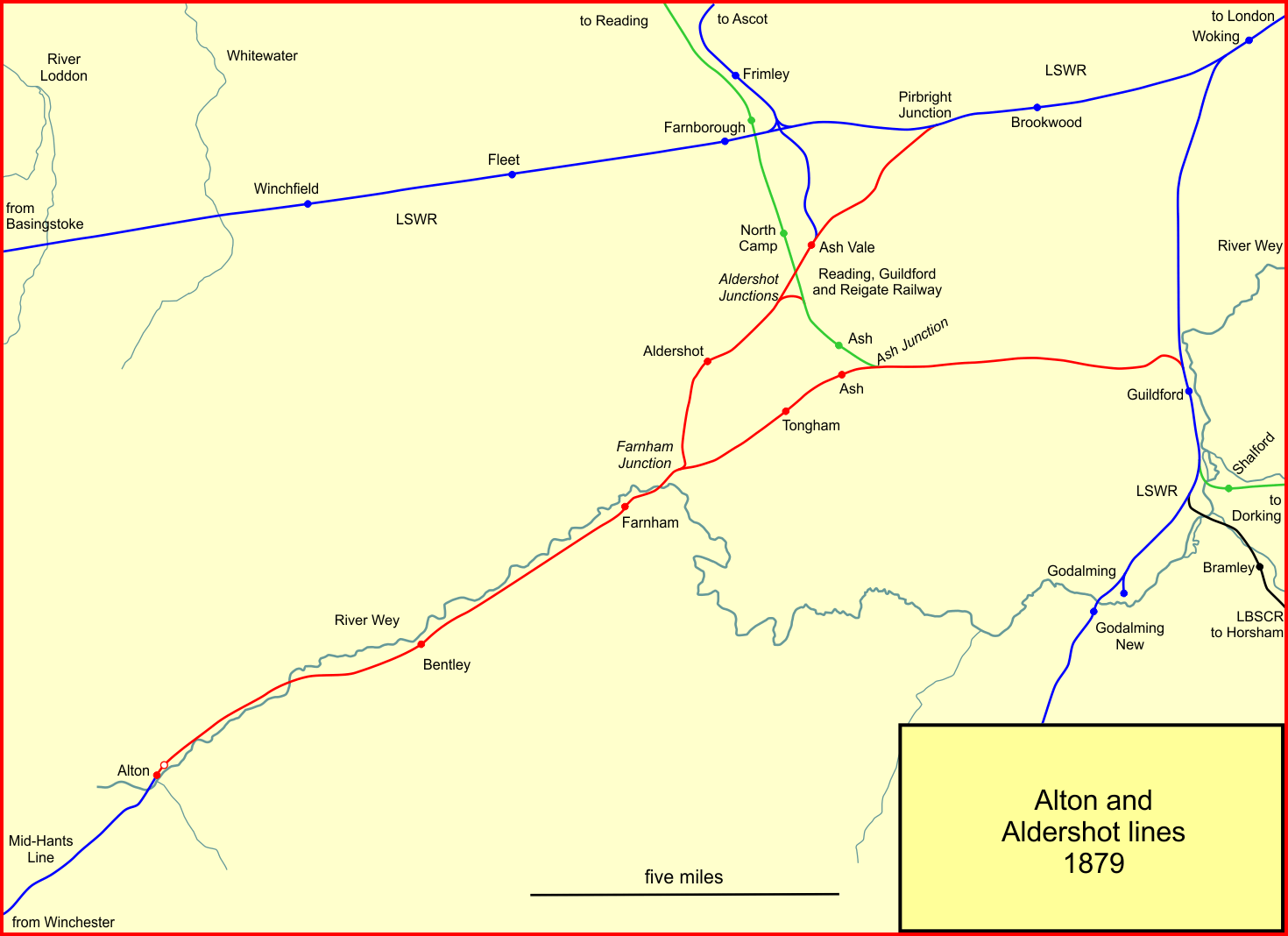
The Aldershot and Alton lines of the LSWR in 1879

In the 1860s there had been a constant stream of proposals to connect Ascot, on the LSWR line to Wokingham, and Aldershot. These had all failed to be built, but the LSWR finally arranged to build such a line, from Ascot through Camberley to Frimley Junction and with a curved spur to Sturt Lane Junction, facing Woking on the main line from Basingstoke. It opened in 1878 and was extended to join the Aldershot line at North Camp on 2 June 1879. North Camp was on the line from Pirbright Junction to Aldershot; the station was later named Ash Vale.

The line between Ash Green and Farnham Junction on the Tongham line was doubled on 4 June 1884. In 1891 Wanborough station was opened. Sir Algernon West had requested it; he lived at Wanborough Manor and was a director of the LSWR.

A gas works had opened, just within the Aldershot council boundary on the Ash Road. Coal for the gas process was delivered by horse and cart nearly a mile from Tongham station. In 1898 a branch line was opened, running due north from Tongham station. The branch was worked by the gas company's own locomotive.

On 30 June 1901 the junction at Pirbright Junction was converted to a flying junction in conjunction with the widening of the main line.

== Connections at Alton ==
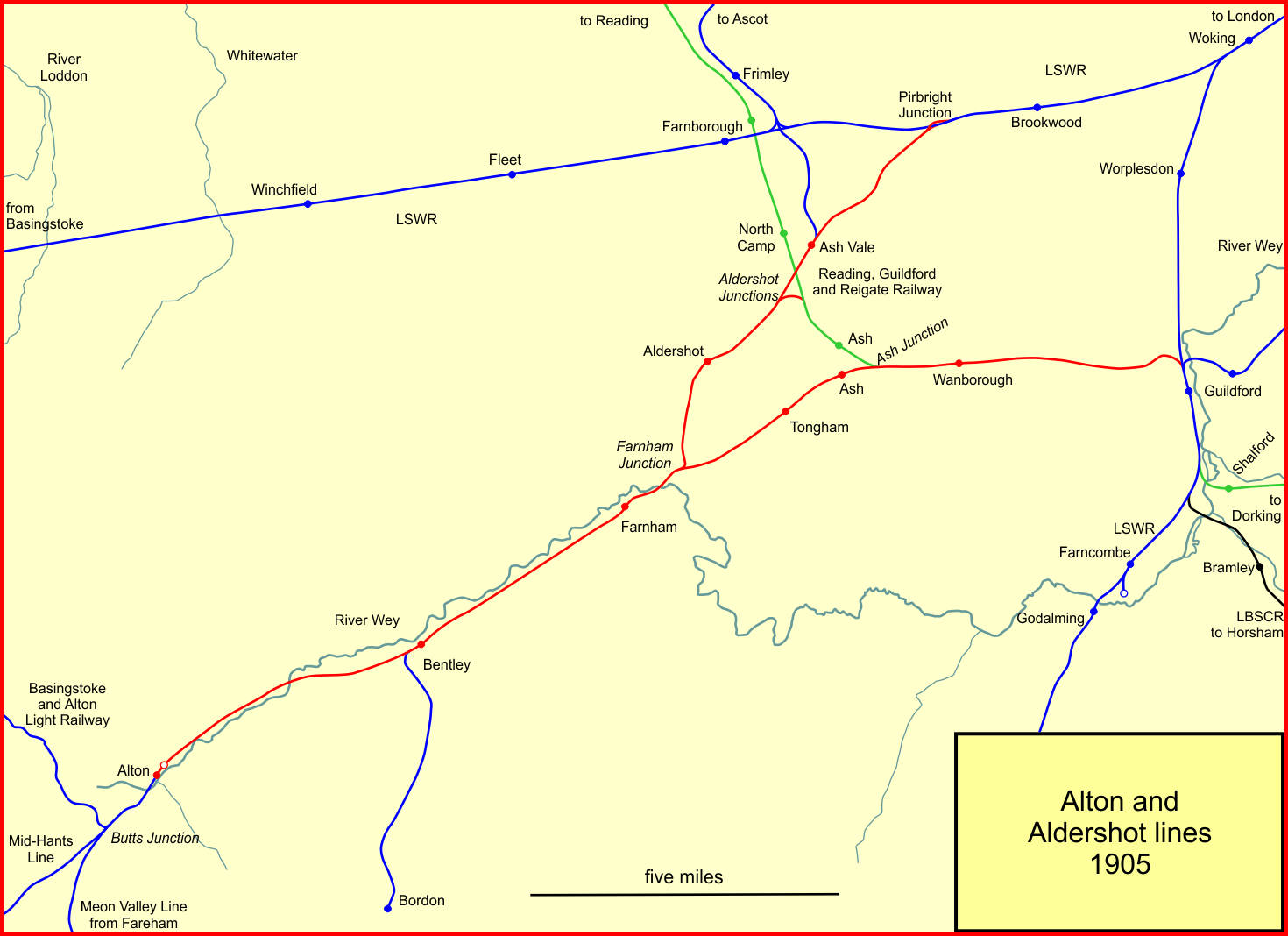
The Aldershot and Alton lines of the LSWR in 1905

Alton station was built as a terminus, but three routes were built, connecting to it from the west.

=== Mid-Hants Line ===
The Mid-Hants Railway was promoted independently to form a line from Alton to Winchester. It was hoped that this would be a main line to compete with the LSWR main line, but its steep gradients and single line meant that this was beyond the grasp of the company. It opened on 2 October 1865. Alton station had been built as a terminus, and was reconstructed a short distance further west as a through station for the Mid-Hants services. It was never commercially successful, and it was closed in 1973.

=== Basingstoke and Alton Light Railway ===
The LSWR felt under pressure to build a north-south railway from Basingstoke to Alton, for fear that if they did not, Portsmouth interests would build a through line to connect with the Great Western Railway at Basingstoke. It was built as a light railway, and joined the Mid-Hants line at Butts Junction, two miles west of Alton, opening on 2 June 1901. The line from there to Alton had been doubled in preparation, opening on the same day. The line was never a success and was closed in 1917 to release track materials for war work in France. It was reopened in 1924, but road competition was fierce and the line closed in 1932 to passengers and completely in 1936.

=== Meon Valley Railway ===
Motivated by the wish to exclude the Great Western Railway from the area, the Meon Valley Railway was promoted by the LSWR to make a railway from Alton to Fareham; it was said by the LSWR to form the shortest route from London to the Isle of Wight, using the steamer pier at Stokes Bay. It ran from Butts Junction to Fareham and opened on 1 June 1903. The anticipated heavy through traffic never developed, and closed to passengers in 1955 and completely in 1968.

== The twentieth century ==
=== Bordon branch ===
A branch line from Bentley to Bordon was opened on 11 December 1905. It served an army garrison in Woolmer Forest. It was authorised by the Bentley and Bordon Light Railway Order 1902. The demands of the military encouraged experimentation with heavier locomotives, not all of them successful. The regular passenger service was withdrawn on 16 September 1957 and the line closed completely on 4 April 1966.

=== Southern Railway and later ===
In 1923 the London and South Western Railway was incorporated, with other large companies, into the new Southern Railway as part of the process known as the Grouping, following the Railways Act 1921. In 1926 the Southern Railway implemented some rationalisation schemes. The double track between Ash Junction and Farnham Junction was reduced to single track on 9 February 1930. The passenger service on the Tongham route was discontinued on 4 July 1937, following electrification of other routes in the area; the line stayed open for goods traffic including serving the gas works. By the early 1950s the goods service was very sparse and British Railways decided that from 21 November 1954 the section from Tongham to Farnham junction would be closed making the Ash Junction end the only access to the route. By 1960 the goods service was further reduced, and the gas works had closed down so that the line was closed completely after 31 December 1960.

=== Railcar trial ===
In May 1932 the Southern Railway tested a Michelin pneumatic tyred railcar between Ascot, Aldershot and Alton. It was an articulated unit, with accommodation for 24 passengers. The trial was not considered successful, despite the excellent acceleration and braking performance, and good economy. The passenger accommodation was very limited and it could not pull a trailer or tail traffic, and it did not have normal railway couplings and buffers, so that in the event of failure could not be rescued; and its rubber tyres would not operate track circuits.

=== Electrification ===
In 1937 the Portsmouth No 1 Electrification scheme was implemented; this was an ambitious project of electrifying the lines to Portsmouth from Woking (for London) and Alton. It was implemented on 4 July 1937, when an intensive regular interval service started between London and Alton via Aldershot. The steam service from Guildford via Tongham to Farnham ceased to run, and an electric shuttle ran to Aldershot (only).

== Present day passenger services ==
In general at the present day (2022) Alton is served by a regular interval service from Waterloo via Brookwood (Pirbright Junction) and Aldershot. Trains run from Guildford to Farnham, and from Ascot to Aldershot.

== Location list ==
=== Guildford to Alton ===
- Guildford; opened 5 May 1845; still open;
- Wanborough; opened 1 September 1891; still open;
- Ash Junction; divergence of Reading line;
- Ash Green; opened 8 October 1849; closed 4 July 1937;
- Tongham; opened by October 1856; closed 4 July 1937;
- Farnham Junction; convergence of line from Aldershot;
- Farnham; opened 8 October 1849; still open;
- Alton; opened 28 July 1852; relocated westward 2 October 1865; still open.

=== Aldershot loop ===
- Ash Junction (above);
- Ash; opened 20 August 1849; renamed Ash & Aldershot, Ash Junction; still open;
- Aldershot South Junction;
- Aldershot North Junction;
- Aldershot; opened 2 May 1870; various names: Aldershot Town & Camp; Aldershot Town South Camp; still open;
- Farnham Junction; above.

=== Pirbright Junction line ===
- Pirbright Junction; divergence from main line;
- North Camp & Ash Vale; convergence of line from Ascot; opened 2 May 1870; later Aldershot North Camp & Ash Vale, North Camp & South Farnborough; settled as Ash Vale from 13 June 1955; still open;
- Aldershot North Junction; above.
