= Alton railway station =

Railway station in Hampshire, England

Coordinates: 51.15200°N 0.96766°W

Alton
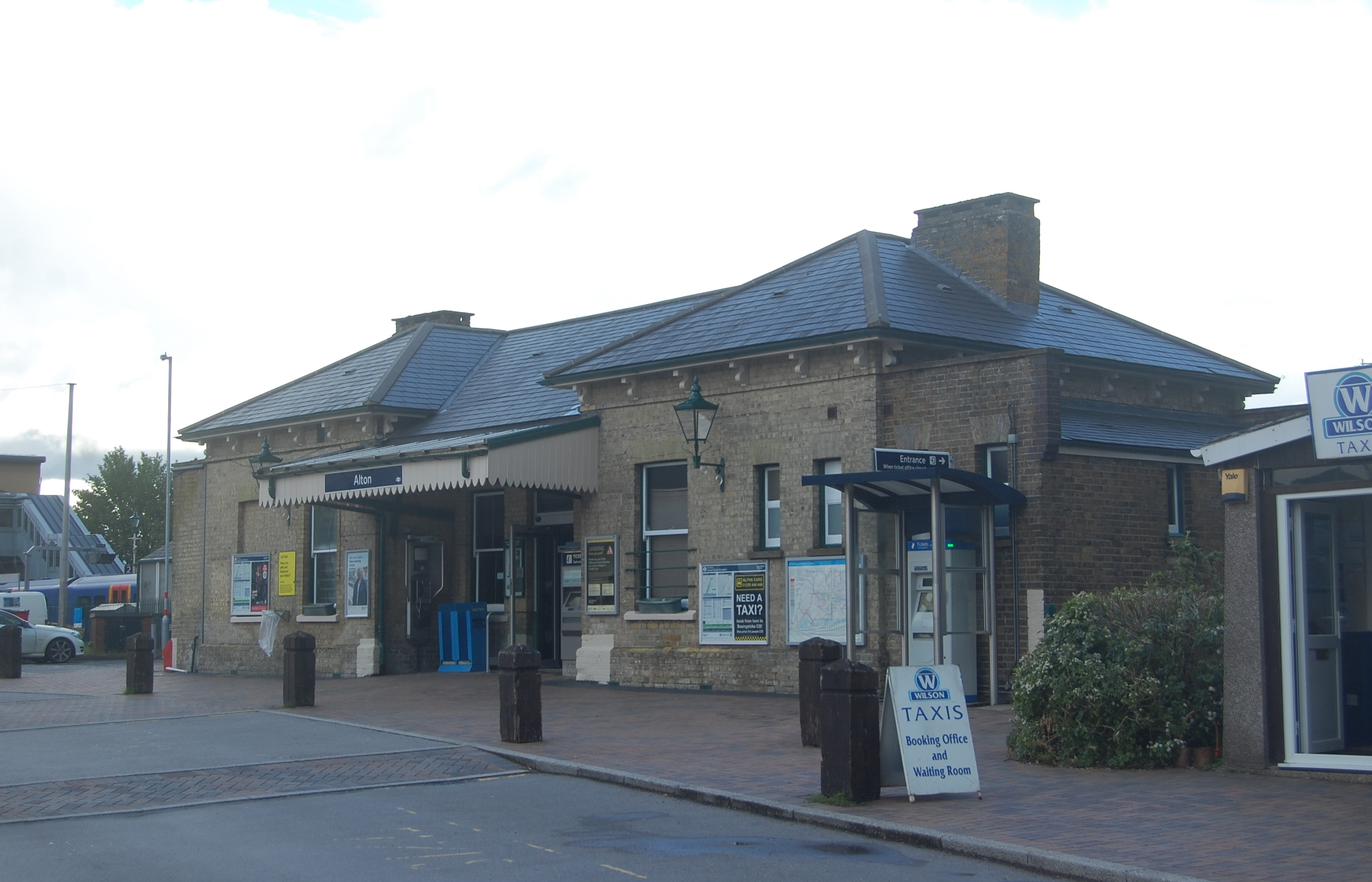

General information
- Location: Alton, East Hampshire; England
- Grid reference: SU723397
- Manager: South Western Railway
- Platforms: 3 (2 National Rail, 1 Watercress Line)

Other information
- Station code: AON
- Classification: DfT category C2

Key dates
- 28 July 1852: Station opens
- 2 October 1865: Station moves to adjacent site
- February 1973: National Rail services west of Alton curtailed
- 25 May 1985: Watercress Line begins heritage services west of Alton

Passengers
- 2020/21: ▼0.133 million
- 2021/22: ▲0.387 million
- 2022/23: ▲0.496 million
- 2023/24: ▲0.544 million
- 2024/25: ▲0.591 million
Location
Notes
- Passenger statistics from the Office of Rail and Road

Alton railway station serves the market town of Alton, in the English county of Hampshire. The station is the terminus for two railway lines: the Alton line, which runs to Brookwood and on to London Waterloo, and the Watercress Line, a heritage railway which runs to Alresford. It is located 49 miles 13 chains (79.1 km) from London Waterloo.

== History ==
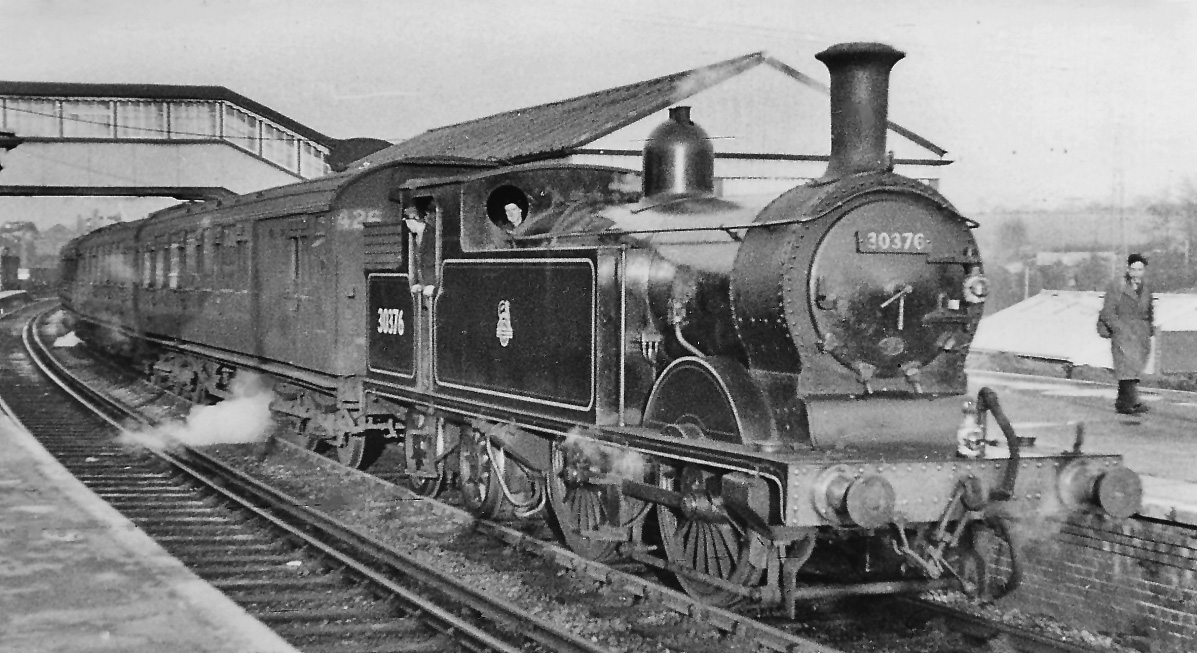
A local train to Winchester in 1955

The first station, opened by the London and South Western Railway (LSWR) on 28 July 1852, was sited on what is now the station car park. It closed when the present station opened on 2 October 1865. The station was briefly named Alton for Selborne between 5 July 1926 and 1955, when it reverted to its current name.

The line, originally built as single track, was doubled in 1901. The line from Woking to Alton was electrified in 1937 and the station passed on to the Southern Region of British Railways on nationalisation in 1948. The line was single-tracked as far as Farnham by British Rail in the early 1980s.

The Alton, Alresford and Winchester Railway - later renamed the Mid-Hants Railway - opened a through line to Winchester in October 1865, but this was closed to passengers in February 1973. It reopened as a heritage line in stages - first from Alresford to Ropley in 1977, and through to Alton by May 1985.

The Basingstoke and Alton Light Railway opened on 1 June 1901. Due to low passenger traffic and the distance from the intermediate stations to their namesake villages, the line closed at short notice on 1 January 1917. The line was reopened due to local pressure on 18 August 1924, but the line closed again permanently in 1967.

The Meon Valley Railway between Alton and Fareham opened two years after the B&ALR, on 1 June 1903. Again, it was deemed financially unsustainable, and in February 1955 closed to passenger traffic, with the final section of line to Farringdon closing permanently in 1968.

== Location ==
The station is nowhere near Alton Towers Resort, which is located in the rural village of Alton in Staffordshire, about 185 miles away. Local residents, who have encountered many people trying to find Alton Towers, have put up posters at the station containing directions from the station to the resort by train, with a journey time of approximately 4 hours and 46 minutes.

== Facilities ==
There is a ticket office which is open seven days a week, with a ticket machine beside the booking hall. There are automated announcements and digital information displays to offer train running details. A car park with 207 spaces is available for passengers.

== Passenger volume ==
Passenger Volume at Alton
	2002–03	2004–05	2005–06	2006–07	2007–08	2008–09	2009–10	2010–11	2011–12	2012–13	2013–14	2014–15	2015–16	2016–17	2017–18	2018–19	2019–20	2020–21	2021–22	2022–23
Entries and exits	400,944	480,790	498,254	548,291	625,926	650,674	706,582	720,478	717,170	720,584	697,306	744,138	753,202	716,162	710,322	711,292	679,324	133,396	386,882	496,032

The statistics cover twelve month periods that start in April.

== Services ==
The standard off-peak service provides two trains per hour to London Waterloo. On Sundays, there is an hourly service, increasing to half-hourly from approximately 13:30. Services are operated by South Western Railway.

Preceding station	National Rail	Following station
Terminus	South Western Railway; Alton Line	Bentley or Farnham
Preceding station	Heritage railways	Following station
Medstead and Four Marks towards Alresford	Watercress Line	Terminus
Disused railways
Terminus	London and South Western Railway; Basingstoke and Alton Light Railway	Treloar's Hospital Platform; Line and station closed
Farringdon Halt	British Rail; Southern Region; Meon Valley Railway	Terminus

== Bibliography ==
- Body, G. (1984), PSL Field Guides - Railways of the Southern Region, Patrick Stephens Ltd, Cambridge. ISBN 0-85059-664-5
- Butt, R. V. J. (October 1995). The Directory of Railway Stations: details every public and private passenger station, halt, platform and stopping place, past and present (1st ed.). Sparkford: Patrick Stephens Ltd. ISBN 978-1-85260-508-7. OCLC 60251199. OL 11956311M.
- Faulkner, J.N.; Williams, R.A. (1988). The LSWR in the 20th Century. Newton Abbot: David & Charles. ISBN 978-0-71-538927-0.
- Jowett, Alan (2000). Jowett's Nationalised Railway Atlas (1st ed.). Penryn, Cornwall: Atlantic Transport Publishers. ISBN 978-0-906899-99-1. OCLC 228266687.
- Quick, Michael (2023). Railway Passenger Stations in Great Britain: A Chronology (PDF) (5th ed.). London: Railway and Canal Historical Society.
