= Alresford railway station (Hampshire) =

Heritage railway station in Hampshire, England

Alresford
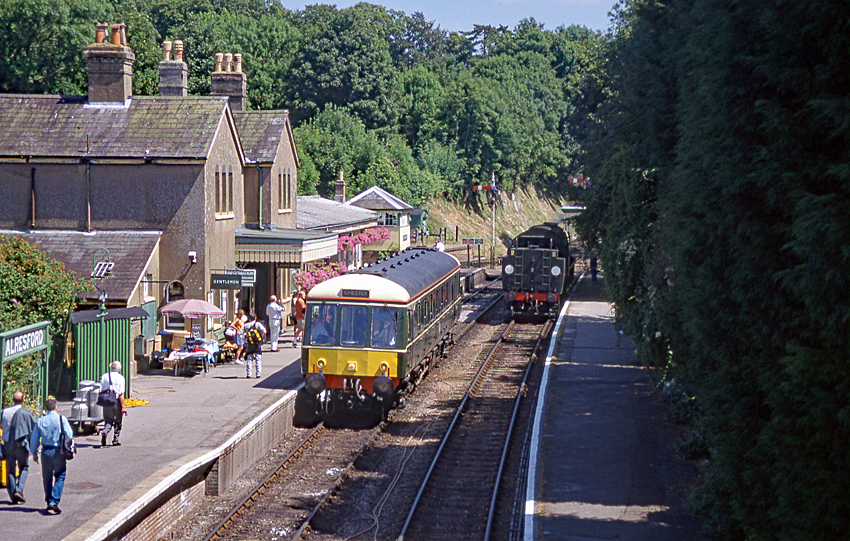

General information
- Location: New Alresford, City of Winchester; England
- Coordinates: 51°05′18″N 1°09′39″W
- Grid reference: SU587324
- System: Station on heritage railway
- Operator: Mid Hants Railway
- Platforms: 2 (3 on certain gala days when the Cattle Dock is used as platform 1A)

History
- Original company: Alton, Alresford and Winchester Railway
- Pre-grouping: London and South Western Railway
- Post-grouping: Southern Railway, Southern Region of British Railways

Key dates
- 2 October 1865: Opened
- 5 February 1973: Closed
- 30 April 1977: Reopened
Location

Alresford railway station (/ˈɔːlsfərd/ or /ˈɒlzfərd/) is in the town of New Alresford, in the City of Winchester district, Hampshire, England.

The station was opened in 1865 by the Alton, Alresford and Winchester Railway and operated as part of the London and South Western Railway and later Southern Railway and the Southern Region of British Railways until its closure in 1973. In official literature it is shown as Alresford (Hampshire) in order to distinguish it from the station of the same name in Essex.

It was reopened in 1977 as the terminus of the Watercress Line from Alton.

== History ==
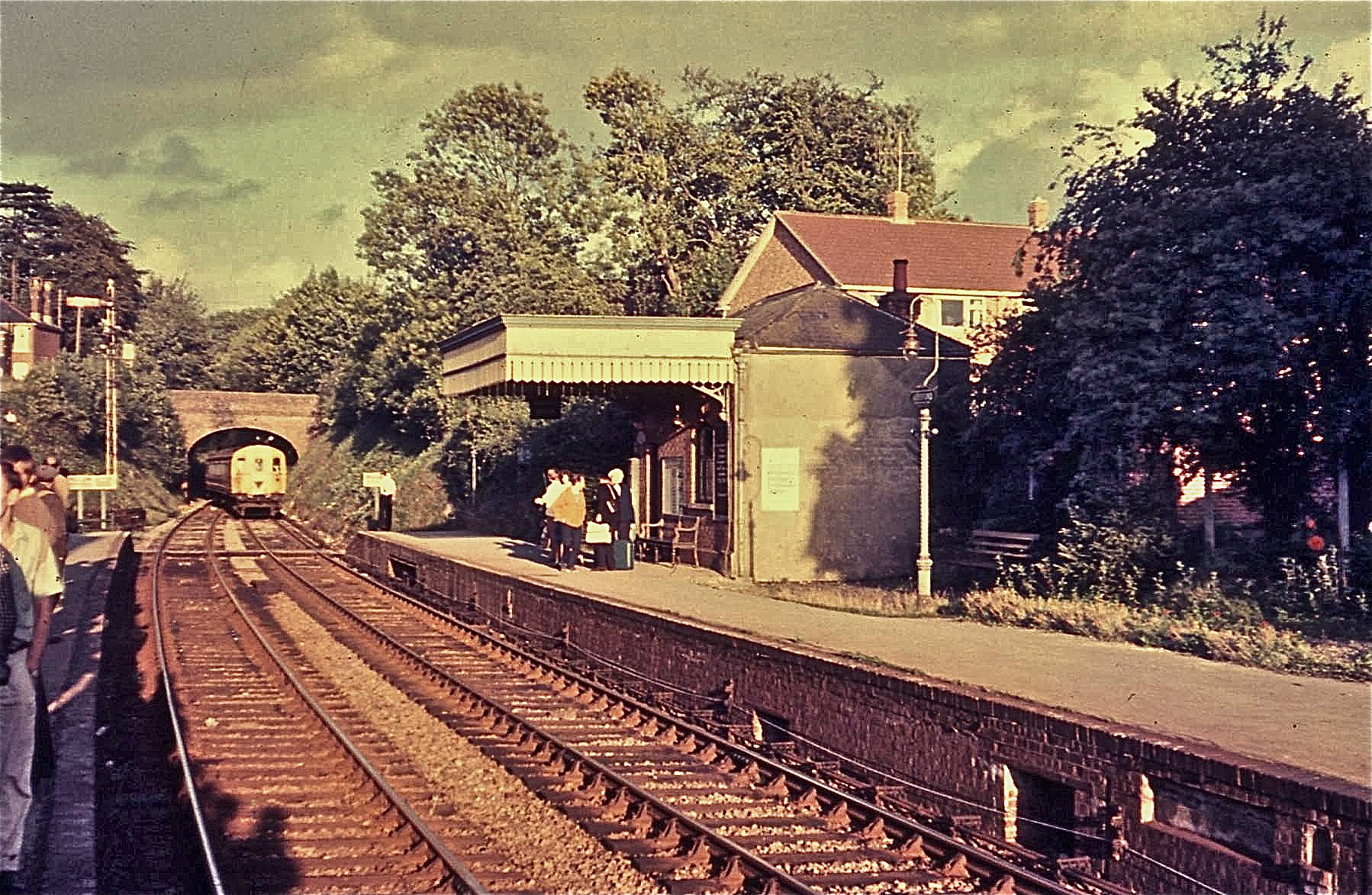
A Class 205 diesel-electric multiple unit approaching the station in 1970

In 1861, work started on the new Alton, Alresford and Winchester Railway which changed its name to the Mid-Hants Railway in 1865 with the line opening in the October of that year. It was bought by the London and South Western Railway in 1884, having operated it from the start. It was absorbed as part of that into the Southern Railway during the Grouping of 1923. The station then passed on to the Southern Region of British Railways upon nationalisation in 1948 and was then closed by the British Railways Board in February 1973.

== Preservation ==
The station reopened on 30 April 1977 as the western terminus of the Watercress Line, a heritage railway.

Alongside the station a goods shed was built which is now used as a shop, as well as meeting and tourist facilities for the railway. Adjacent to the station is a large warehouse which was built in 1873 as a mill and later used as a factory; it is now used for offices and is Grade II listed. The buffet building is the old station building from Lyme Regis in Dorset, which was dismantled and rebuilt here.

Following the closure of the route between Alton and Winchester, the line from Alresford eastwards to Alton has been reopened in preservation, but the section west of Alresford has not. It is unlikely that the line will ever be re-extended towards Winchester because the M3 motorway and new houses have been built at various points along the former route.

Both platforms have been extended to hold four-coach trains; the 'Cattle Dock' is used particularly during steam locomotive gala exhibitions as platform 1A, holding a two-coach train when not otherwise used.

Preceding station	Heritage railways	Following station
Terminus	Watercress Line	Ropley towards Alton
Historical railways
Itchen Abbas; Line and station closed	London and South Western Railway; Alton, Alresford and Winchester Railway	Ropley; Line and station open
