= Farringdon Halt railway station =

Former railway station in Hampshire, England

Farringdon Halt
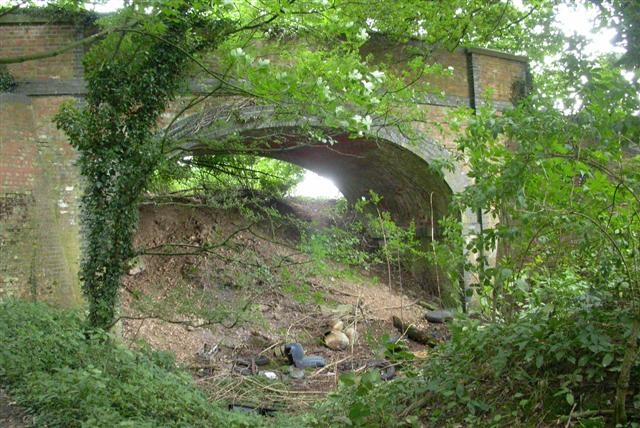
- Woodside Lane overbridge, north of the station site

General information
- Location: Upper Farringdon, East Hampshire; England
- Coordinates: 51.109729°N 0.995972°W
- Grid reference: SU701353
- Platforms: One

Other information
- Status: Disused

History
- Original company: Southern Railway
- Post-grouping: Southern Railway; Southern Region of British Railways

Key dates
- 1 May 1931: Opened as Farringdon Halt
- 1 May 1932: Renamed Faringdon Platform
- 8 July 1934: Renamed Farringdon Halt
- 7 February 1955: Closed to passengers
- 13 August 1968: Closed for freight
Location

Farringdon Halt was an intermediate railway station on the Meon Valley line, which ran from Alton to Fareham in Hampshire, England, during the 20th century.

== History ==
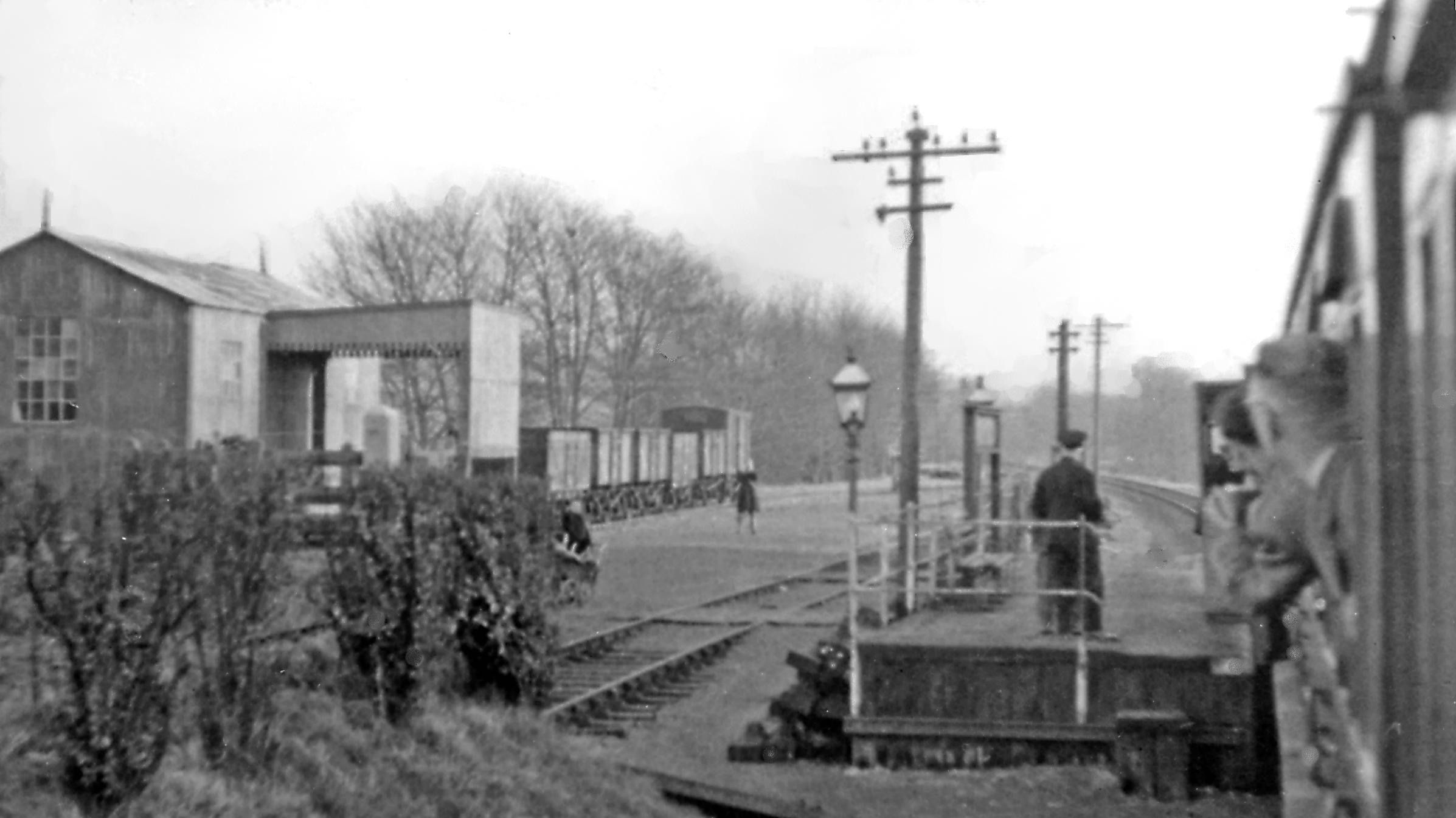
Farringdon Halt, on the last working day of the branch

The station opened on 1 May 1931 as Farringdon Halt; the Meon Valley Railway was a particularly difficult line to construct. A goods yard for loading agricultural produce was already sited there and a short wooden platform of one coach-length was built to serve the village in 1930.

The halt was known briefly as Faringdon Platform for a short period in the 1930s, before reverting to its original name.

The passenger service ceased on 7 February 1955. The sidings were used intermittently for goods traffic until 13 August 1968, after which the track was lifted.

== The site today ==
The site is now a small business/light industrial park. The access road to the modern site is along the former railway trackbed from the A32.

== Route ==
Preceding station	Disused railways	Following station
Alton	British Rail; Southern Region; Meon Valley Railway	Tisted

== See also ==
- List of closed railway stations in Britain
