= Watercress Line =

Heritage railway in Hampshire, England

Mid-Hants Railway

Watercress Line
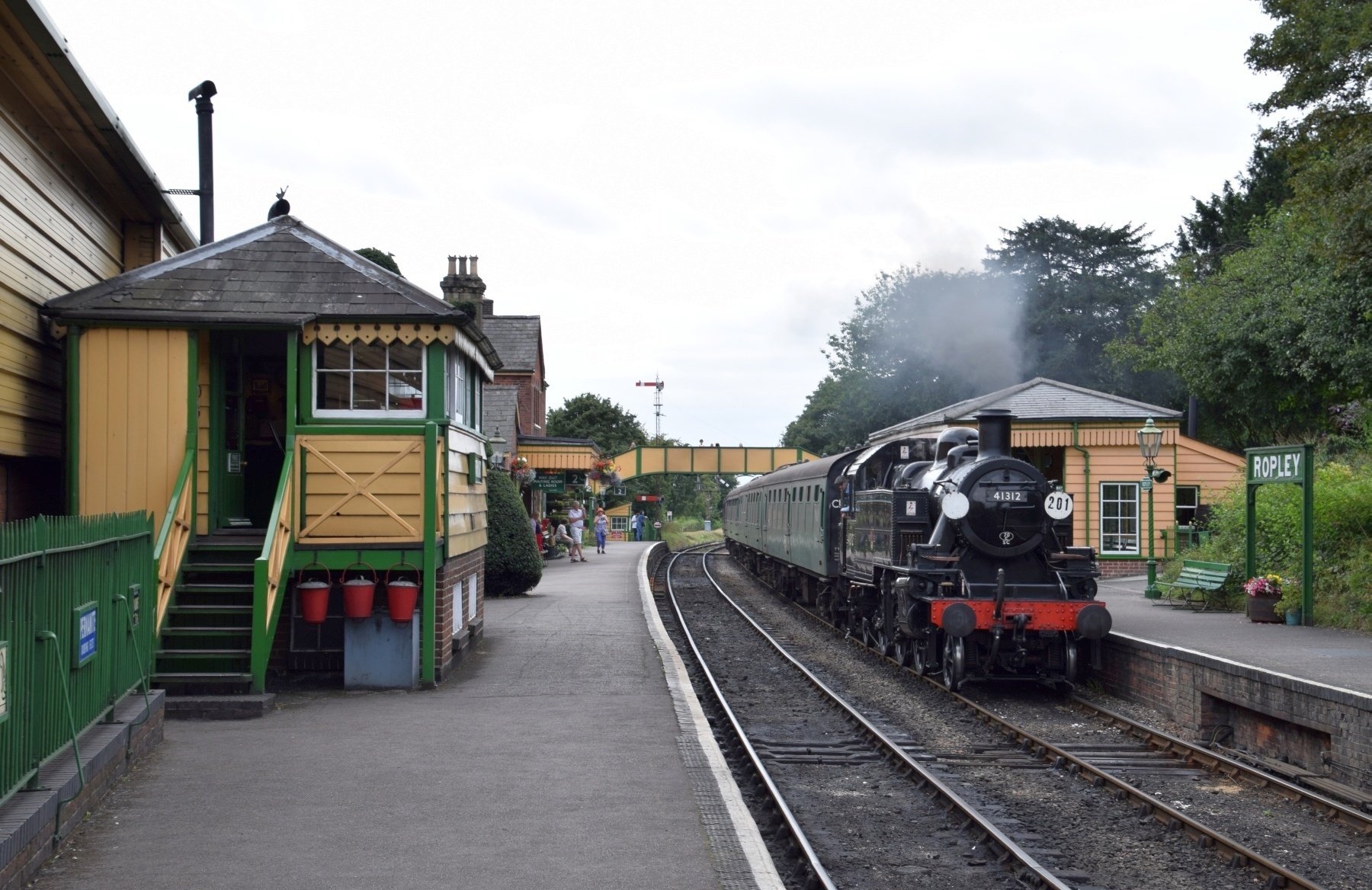
- A steam engine hauling a train into Ropley
- Locale: Hampshire, England
- Connections: Network Rail track at Alton

Commercial operations
- Name: Mid-Hants Railway
- Built by: Alton, Alresford and Winchester Railway Company
- Original gauge: 4 ft 8 1/2 in (1,435 mm) standard gauge

Preserved operations
- Operated by: Mid-Hants Railway Ltd
- Stations: 4
- Length: 10 miles (16 km)
- Preserved gauge: Standard gauge

Commercial history
- Opened: 2 October 1865
- Closed: 5 February 1973

Preservation history
- 1975: Line purchased from British Rail
- 1977: Reopened between Alresford and Ropley
- 1983: Reopened to Medstead and Four Marks
- 1985: Reopened to Alton
- Headquarters: Alresford station

Website
- www.watercressline.co.uk

The Watercress Line is the marketing name of the Mid-Hants Railway, a preserved railway in Hampshire, England. The line runs for 10 miles (16 km) from New Alresford to Alton, where it connects to the National Rail network. It gained its popular name in the days when it was used to transport locally-grown watercress to markets in London. The railway currently operates regular scheduled services, along with dining trains, real ale trains and numerous special events throughout the year.

== History ==
=== National network operation ===
In 1861, the Alton, Alresford and Winchester Railway Company was authorised to build a new railway to connect to the existing London & South Western Railway lines at Alton and Winchester. It was opened on 2 October 1865 as the Mid-Hants Railway. Trains were operated by the London & South Western Railway which eventually purchased the Mid-Hants Railway Company in 1884.

Stations were initially constructed at Itchen Abbas, Ropley and Alresford. The station at Alton was already in existence; Medstead and Four Marks was added in 1868. Just outside this station, the line is at its highest point, at 652 feet (199 m) above sea level, having risen from Alresford (Note: 263 feet (80 m) above sea level.) and descending to Alton. (Note: 339 feet (103 m) above sea level.) The section of line became known as The Alps, due to the steep gradients that exist there.

The line provided an alternative route between London and Southampton and, besides transporting locally produced watercress, was particularly important for military traffic between the army town of Aldershot and the military embarkation port at Southampton.

With the development of motorised transport, the line declined during the inter-war and post-war periods of the 20th century. It was further compromised by the closures of the Basingstoke and Alton Light Railway in 1932 and the Meon Valley Railway in 1955. Electrification of the line from London to Alton in 1937 meant that the Watercress Line was no longer part of a through route; it became necessary to change at Alton. Electrification of the line from London to Southampton occurred in 1967, which further affected the economics of the Mid-Hants route.

The line became part of the Southern Railway in 1923 and then part of the Southern Region of British Railways in 1948. It survived the Beeching Axe in 1963, but was eventually closed by British Rail in February 1973. During final years of operation under British Rail, passenger train services were operated by Class 205 2H two-carriage diesel-electric multiple units.

In 1941, prototype Merchant Navy Class 21C1 Channel Packet travelled as far as Alresford, after the naming ceremony at Southampton Central for a trial run with press and dignitaries.

=== Heritage railway ===
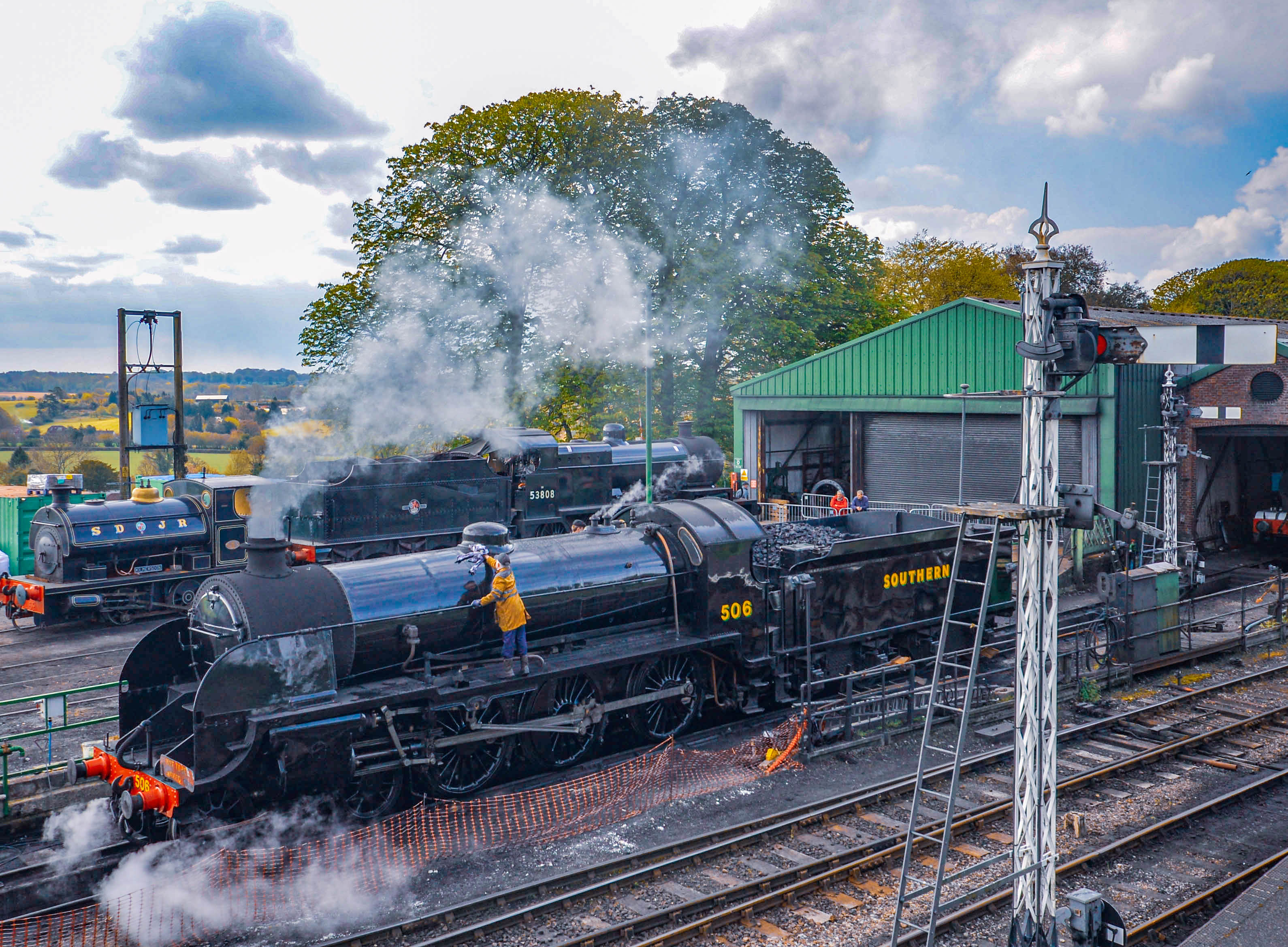
Ropley locomotive shed

The section of line from Alresford to Alton was purchased from British Rail in November 1975 by the Mid-Hants Railway Preservation Society. Reconstruction of the line was progressed subsequently in stages by the society; the section between Alresford and Ropley reopened on 30 April 1977. To provide engineering and maintenance facilities, the main locomotive shed and workshops were constructed at Ropley. The extension to Medstead & Four Marks opened on 28 May 1983 and the final section to Alton on 25 May 1985.

On 12 June 1982, a replica of Sans Pareil visited the Watercress Line, running successfully under its own power from Ropley to Alresford.

Some of the structures that can be seen on the line today were not part of the original railway infrastructure; they have been added to make the line serviceable again and to recreate the feel of a fully operational steam railway. The line is now maintained by a small base of paid staff, who are mostly in administrative duties, with a core of over 550 volunteers.

The railway is a registered charity.

== Locomotives and rolling stock ==
The Mid-Hants Railway plays host to a large collection of steam and diesel locomotives, multiple units, passenger coaches and restored wagons, most of which are from the 1920s to 1960s period:

- Steam locomotives include Bulleid Pacifics of the Merchant Navy and West Country, SR Lord Nelson class, Schools Class, S15, BR Standard Class 4, BR Standard Class 9F, LMS Ivatt Tank and a Black 5
- Diesel locomotives include examples of Class 33, Class 47 and Class 50; shunters include Class 03, Class 08s and Class 11
- Multiple units are a Class 205 Hampshire and a Class 150 Sprinter, which was donated by the leasing company Porterbrook in late 2025.

== Infrastructure ==
=== Stations ===
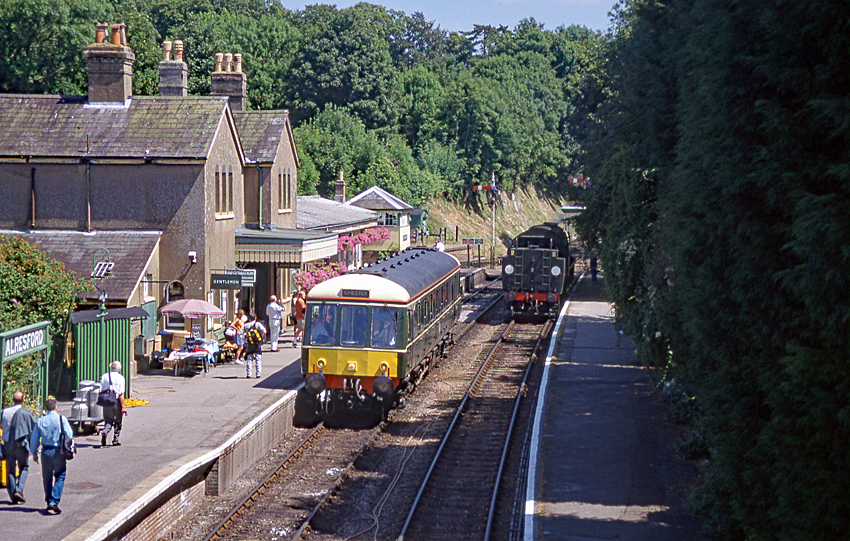
Alresford station from the footbridge

The Watercress Line has four stations on the site of former British Rail stations. Each features a passing loop, allowing trains to pass one another or locomotives to run around trains for a change of direction of travel. Alton station has three platforms: 1 and 2 operating on the National Rail network, with 3 on the Watercress Line. The other three stations each have two platforms with connecting footbridges:

- Alton: at the north-east end of the line. It has one passenger platform, with two others are assigned to South Western Railway. There is a cross-platform connection to the town and onward services to London Waterloo. Alton has two passing loops: one within station limits and another just outside, allowing trains to pass outside the station to reduce the impact of the single platform during intensive operations. There are several additional sidings.
- Medstead and Four Marks: the highest station in Hampshire, fully restored in the style of a quiet 1940s Southern Railway station. The line's Signal and Telegraph department, Permanent Way group, and Building department are all located here, in and around the station yard. There are several sidings. This is where the greatest number of trains pass each other on standard running days.
- Ropley: the engineering centre of the line, and the location of the locomotive maintenance and running sheds. The station has flower beds and topiary, with the largest of the line's four signal boxes, controlling movements through the station, as well as much shunting to and from the locomotive yard.
- Alresford: at the southern end of the line is the main visitor station and has the most passenger facilities, including a museum, buffet and two shops. Most of the carriage stock is stored at this station, with Alresford Train Care performing day-to-day maintenance and cleaning of the carriages.

=== Imported structures ===
Imported structures
Station	Structure	Original site
Alresford	Footbridge	Uckfield, East Sussex
Alresford	West Country Buffet (building)	Lyme Regis, Dorset
Alresford	West Country Buffet (counter)	Okehampton, Devon
Alresford	Platform canopy columns (Note: These now supporting the upper floor in the former Goods Shed Visitor Centre.)	Ringwood, Hampshire
Ropley	Platform canopy columns (Note: Heritage wrought iron stanchions are incorporated into the new waiting room building.)	Ringwood, Hampshire
Ropley	Signal box	Netley, Hampshire
Ropley	Footbridge	North Tawton, Devon
Ropley	Footbridge, near picnic area	London King's Cross, Greater London
Ropley	Water tank	Longmoor Military Railway, Liss, Hampshire
Ropley	Platform water column (Note: From the London, Brighton and South Coast Railway.)	Christ's Hospital, West Sussex
Ropley	Wheel drop	Bricklayers Arms, south London
Ropley	Groundframe hut (Note: Formerly used at Ropley in two locations as a signal box for many years,)	Dean, Wiltshire
Medstead & Four Marks	Signal box	Wilton South, Wiltshire
Medstead & Four Marks	Footbridge	Cowes, Isle of Wight
Medstead & Four Marks	Signal box (Note: Recovered by the Mid-Hants Railway in October 2010 for use as a display.)	Great Missenden, Buckinghamshire
Alton	Signal box	Bentley, Hampshire
Alton	Water tower	Aldershot, Hampshire

=== Signalling and safety systems ===
- Alton signal box: a new signalling installation has been commissioned at Alton. It is a colour-light system, running from the signal box control panel; this contrasts with the mechanical semaphore signals used on the rest of the line. The new system allows a more intensive train service, making use of the loop and allows shunting within the station which the previous manual flag signalling did not allow. The new installation makes use of track circuits to detect where the train is situated and can change points and signals accordingly. It can run fully automatically, so there is no need for a signalman, unlike the other signal boxes on the line. When there is no signalman, all signal post telephones are diverted to Medstead and Four Marks signal box. It works on a system where a member of the locomotive crew inserts the token into a switch, to allow the system to take the next steps.
- Ropley signal box: phase one of the Ropley resignalling project, construction of the new signal box, has been completed. Phase two was completed in 2012, which included installation of working distant signals, in place of the existing fixed distant signals. The signals are motorised semaphore signals, as they are too far from the signal box to be operated mechanically without considerable physical effort by the signalman. The scheme also included installing advanced starting and outer home signals in both directions.
- Automatic Warning System (AWS): the Watercress Line is currently the only heritage railway with a complete AWS. It is used on all distant signals on the line and at all signals in the Alton colour light area, until an AWS gap is reached before the Meon Loop due to the large number of signals. Almost all of the locomotives and multiple units are fitted with it, apart from a couple of steam locomotives.
- Train Protection & Warning System (TPWS): this system is not used by the Watercress Line; however, the Class 205 Hampshire unit has TPWS fitted.

== Heritage Lottery Fund awards ==
Heritage Lottery Fund (HLF) awards enabled the Old Goods Shed at Alresford to be restored and opened in 2000, and for the wheel drop shed at Ropley to be built by 2005.

The Mid Hants Railway received £550,000 from the HLF in October 2008 for improvement projects.

A new two-track carriage and wagon workshop has been built at Ropley; it is capable of holding four carriages under cover. The workshop is intended to meet the particular needs for the restoration of wooden vehicles with woodworking machinery, a retained carpenter and apprentice/trainee carpenters.

Extensions to the locomotive workshop are a small machine shop, stores area and a set of volunteers' refreshment and changing facilities. Viewing platforms for visitors take in the locomotive and carriage workshops, and the boiler workshop. Materials and displays for interpretation and overview are provided to educate visitors in the work and trades used to maintain and improve a largely manually-maintained, bespoke set of rolling stock.

A historic signal box assisted by a grant from the Railway Heritage Trust is installed at Medstead. It provides a hands-on signalling experience for visitors together with space for an exhibition of Strowger telephone equipment.

The cost of this round of projects exceeded £1 million, assisted by funds within the railway and by additional volunteer labour.

== Incidents ==
There have been several incidents at the Watercress Line over its history; most incidents have been confined to mechanical failure of railway systems. The two major incidents were:

- On 1 December 2007, a passenger fell to his death from the platform at Alresford as he tried to board a departing Real Ale Train, just after 10pm
- On 26 July 2010, a fire broke out in the newly constructed Carriage and Wagon workshop at Ropley station.
