= Mid-Hants Railway =

Mid Hants Railway in Hampshire, England

The Mid-Hants Railway (MHR) originated when local people promoted a railway line between Alton and a junction near Winchester, connected to the larger London and South Western Railway at each end. It was authorised as the Alton, Alresford and Winchester Railway in 1861, and changed its name to the Mid-Hants Railway in 1865. It was opened for traffic in 1865. It was a single track 18 miles long, and had some very steep gradients. It had been unable to raise much share capital and it was heavily indebted from the outset, incurring heavy interest outlays.

The MHR was dependent on the LSWR to operate its line, but there was constant antagonism between the two companies, as the MHR felt that the LSWR ought to do more to bring traffic to the line; this included the wish that the LSWR would divert main line expresses over the MHR. The MHR talked of operating the line itself, but its massive indebtedness, and its operational dependency on the LSWR at Alton and Winchester, made this impractical. A long lease to the LSWR was agreed in 1880 and the business was sold to the LSWR in 1884.

Electric trains from London were able to reach Alton in 1937, and passenger trains were only shuttle services from Alton, but the introduction of diesel trains on a frequent timetable in 1957 improved the meagre passenger business. Nevertheless, the passenger and goods use of the line was unsustainable and the line closed in 1973. A heritage operator, the Watercress Line, works trains on the line between Alton and Alresford.

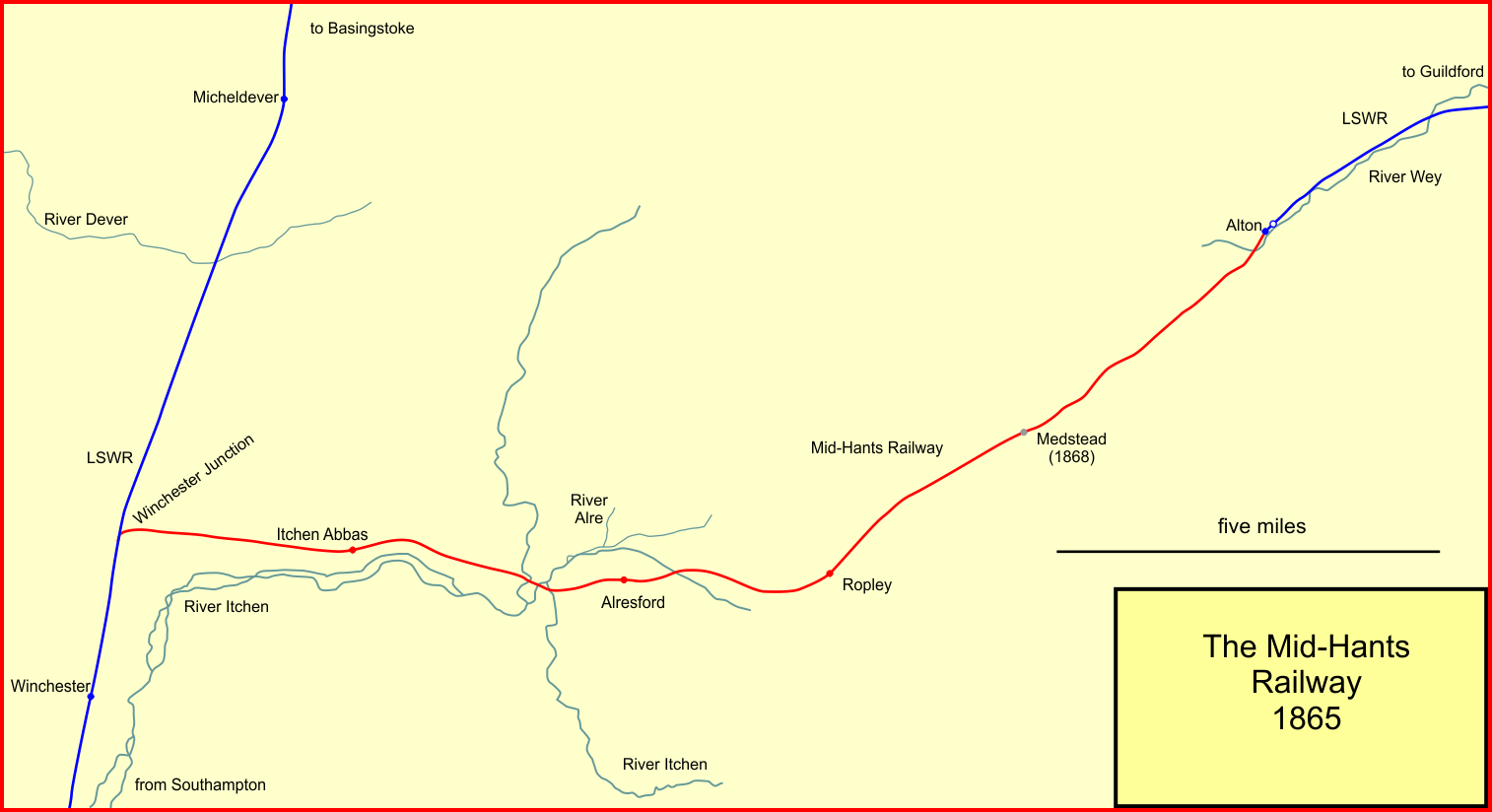
Mid-Hants Railway on opening

== History ==
=== Promotion of the Alton, Alresford and Winchester Railway ===
In 1852 Alton was connected to the emerging railway network when it became the terminus of an LSWR branch line from Guildford.

In the following years it became evident that communities that were not connected to a railway experienced a major disadvantage compared to those that were: the transport costs of heavy commodities being brought in were very high, and locally manufactured goods and agricultural products suffered corresponding costs. People living in the villages between Alton and Winchester now sought a railway connection to Winchester. However the area was thinly populated and lacked industry; moreover the terrain was challenging and any line would necessitate a daunting climb to Medstead, to get out of the valley of the River Wey and cross the watershed into the valley of the River Itchen. The LSWR made it clear that it was not interested in co-operating with a local scheme.

Nevertheless, a projected line was submitted to the 1861 session of Parliament; it was to be called the Alton, Alresford and Winchester Railway. In March 1861 the promoters issued a prospectus acknowledging that villages on the intended route were held back by lack of railway access, and that the cost of their necessities of life had greatly increased. A single line would be constructed as economically as possible, and with gradients suitable to the improvements in the present powers of traction. In addition, it was claimed, the line would connect the major Army depot at Aldershot with military establishments at Winchester, Dorchester, Netley Hospital and the coast. A line had been designed with the professional help of J. E. Errington.

When the bill was under consideration in Parliament, the LSWR opposed it, and declined to negotiate an arrangement to operate the line when it was built. However, there was reason to be concerned that rejection of the AAWR would encourage it to align with the Petersfield Railway, which was then seeking an extension to Southampton. The LSWR did not want to encourage an incursion into its established territory, so it made a concession to the promoters over the working agreement, and indicated the possibility that it would take shares in the line. The LSWR also conceded clauses stipulating the arrangements at junctions with the LSWR and use of its stations at Alton and Winchester stations.

=== Authorisation of the AAWR ===
Alton, Alresford and Winchester Railway Act 1861
- Act of Parliament
- Parliament of the United Kingdom
- Long title: An Act for making Railways between the London and South-western Railway at Alton, Alresford, and the Railway of the London and South-western Railway Company near to Winchester, and for other Purposes.
- Citation: 24 & 25 Vict. c. cxi

Dates
- Royal assent: 28 June 1861

The Alton, Alresford and Winchester Railway (AAWR), got its authorising act of Parliament, the Alton, Alresford and Winchester Railway Act 1861 (24 & 25 Vict. c. cxi) on 28 June 1861; permitted share capital was set at £150,000, and the LSWR could take up to £25,000 in shares if it wished. The AAWR line authorised was 18 1/2 miles in length, from the LSWR near Alton station, through Medstead and Ropley, passing near Alresford church, and onwards via Tichborne and Itchen Abbas to a junction with the LSWR about two miles north of Winchester station.

At a board meeting immediately after getting the act, held on 6 July 1861, the directors expressed concern about the severe 1 in 60 gradients on the authorised line, and they asked Errington to survey an alternative route. He did so, and suggested an alternative route that limited the gradients to 1 in 75, but at the expense of an 800-yard tunnel. It was noted that an altered line of route would require a fresh authorising act of Parliament, at a cost of about £25,000, and the board decided to leave matters as they were.

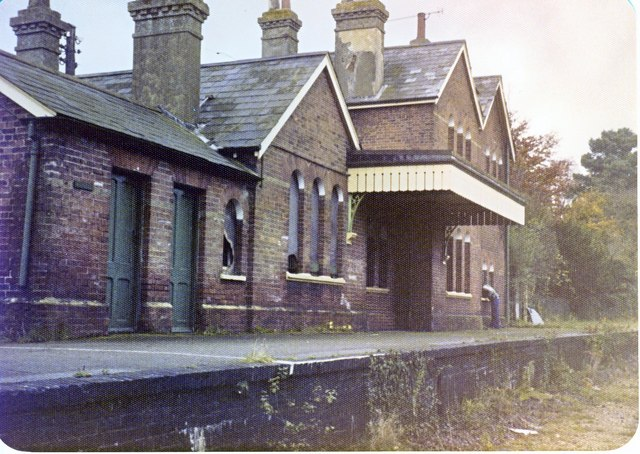
Itchen Abbas station

Indecisive management by the board was also exhibited at the first shareholders' general meeting, when the chairman stated that “the line was being staked out by the engineer, or at least he would commence doing so this week.” It was also announced that there had been a disappointing take-up of shares, only £20,000 having been subscribed: (Note: Investors would 'subscribe' for shares, and a railway company would make periodical 'calls' for relatively small parts of the total value of subscription, as work progressed. There was almost always a specified limitation on this, so the company could not demand the whole of the £20,000 to be paid in at once.) obviously construction could not start in earnest.

Some limited construction work probably started in late December 1861 or soon after, by Smith & Knight, contractors, under the engineer, J. H. Tolme. (Note: According to Williams; but Hardingham states that Smith and Knight were appointed later by Hankey.) Some landowners agreed to take payment for their land in shares rather than cash. The original intention to build a line as cheaply as possible had to be modified when the LSWR's requirements (as prospective operator) were taken into account. Bridges had to be built sufficient for widening to a double line later, and the track had to be made to the LSWR's main line standards. These stipulations generated bad feeling against the LSWR.

The situation naturally became well known in financial circles, and in August 1862 a Mr Arthur Hankey wrote to the board offering to finance the construction personally subject to certain financial considerations. Hankey was going to loan the money against Lloyds bonds. The board was uncertain whether it had the power to accept this financing arrangement, but it was persuaded after taking legal advice. Hankey's financial considerations would obviously involve the company paying more for their line, but the alternative was to abandon the project. Hankey entered into a contract with the company on 3 February 1863 and engaged Smith and Knight as contractors for the construction.

=== Proposed extension, and name change to the Mid-Hants Railway ===
Mid Hants Act 1864
- Act of Parliament
- Parliament of the United Kingdom
- Long title: An Act for changing the Name of the Alton, Alresford, and Winchester Railway Company, and for authorizing them to make and maintain Railways (the Mid-Hants Lines) in extension of their authorized Railways (the Alton Lines), and to raise Monies for the Purpose, and to make Arrangements with other Companies; and for other Purposes.
- Citation: 27 & 28 Vict. c. ccxcviii

Dates
- Royal assent: 29 July 1864
- Commencement: 29 July 1864

Status: Current legislation

Text of statute as originally enacted

Notwithstanding the poor take-up of shares, the AAWR published plans early in 1864 for another line, from Ropley to Fareham. The original main line, now under construction, was directed to Winchester and Southampton, but this new proposal pointed towards Portsmouth. As a direct railway from Woking through Aldershot to Farnham (not Fareham) was planned, the directors expected greatly to increase their traffic and to become part of the shortest main route from London to the Isle of Wight, via Stokes Bay. Reflecting the wider scope of its planned network, the AAWR changed its name to become the Mid-Hants Railway Company (MHR) (Note: Formally the Mid-Hants (Alton Lines) Railway.) When the matter was considered in Parliament, however the new line was cut back to run only from Ropley to Meonstoke. The name change and permission to build this stub were passed in the Mid Hants Act 1864 (27 & 28 Vict. c. ccxcviii) of 29 July, effective from 1 January 1865, with extra capital powers of £25,000. The Meonstoke line was never built and no capital was ever raised for it; it was formally abandoned by Board of Trade warrant of 29 October 1869.

=== Opening; and difficult relations with the LSWR ===
Expecting soon to open its original line between Alton and Winchester, the company made a ten-year working agreement with the LSWR on 17 February 1865. The line had to be "at least as substantial and complete in all respects as the Portsmouth Railway (Godalming to Havant)" of the LSWR, and if traffic justified it, the MHR was to double the line. The LSWR was to stock, staff and work the line, but the MHR would appoint the secretary and office staff except booking clerks. The LSWR would receive 42.5% of gross receipts until the MHR was able to pay dividends of 4%, when the LSWR could take 45%.

The LSWR built a new through station at Alton; the old terminus station buildings were converted to house the stationmaster. The single line between Alton and Winchester Junction opened to the public on 2 October 1865, with one goods and four passenger trains each way on weekdays only; some of the passenger trains were LSWR Guildford to Alton trains extended to Southampton. While earthworks settled, trains covered the 19 miles between Alton and Winchester in one hour, but from 1 August 1866 the fastest journey was 47min. Journeys from Southampton to London using the line via Guildford were now possible, but slow; a typical journey time was 3 hours 26 minutes compared with 2 hours 18 minutes via Basingstoke.

There were already clear signs of tension between the LSWR and the MHR company; this was illustrated when MHR directors asked for free passes over the LSWR between London and Alton, Winchester and Southampton. The LSWR told them that as a matter of right they were not entitled to travel free on the line now that it was leased. In January 1866 the MHR complained repeatedly that the LSWR was not operating the railway to achieve best results.

Average receipts for the operation of the line averaged about £7,000 for the first three years, giving the MHR an annual profit of about £3,675. (Note: On capital outlay of £200,000 this equates to 1.8% (2020).) On 31 January 1867 a bill in Chancery was filed against the company, in respect of unpaid interest owed, and on 4 July 1867 a receiver was appointed. While the situation lasted the MHR share of receipts had to be handed direct to the receiver. The MHR was released from receivership when it filed a scheme of arrangement-with its creditors, confirmed in April 1869, making a rearrangement of its stock.

The LSWR opened a new line from Pirbright Junction (near Brookwood) to Farnham Junction on 2 May 1870. This formed a direct route from London to Alton: up until that time the eastward connection to Alton had only been via Guildford, making a rather roundabout journey from London. The new line put the MHR potentially on a direct line between London and Southampton. However the MHR naively imagined that the LSWR ought to transfer through traffic between London and Southampton away from the main line over the MHR, an operationally difficult single line with steep gradients. The friction between the MHR and the LSWR led to a Parliamentary Commission hearing. The MHR listed a series of complaints and demands for facilities off its own route, while the LSWR indicated a number of technical matters that had needed to be attended to so as to improve the MHR line.

=== Revised working agreement, and sale of the business ===
The original working agreement had been for ten years and MHR dissatisfaction was such that the directors decided not to renew it. They were going to seek running powers between Guildford and Winchester, and were preparing to work their line with their own rolling stock. The LSWR promised another agreement on improved terms, and negotiations began: the LSWR continued to work the line meanwhile, and matters dragged on 15 August 1878, when a new agreement was reached. This was for seven years. from 1 January 1878, giving the MHR the same proportions of gross receipts, but including a mileage proportion of all goods. and mineral traffic passing between stations in the Guildford and Alton areas and the LSWR system west of Winchester.

Another agreement of 3 August 1880 cancelled that of 1878 as from 31 December 1879, and gave the LSWR a 999-year lease from 1 January 1880 for £9,200 yearly. The MHR could within two years require the LSWR to purchase it, or the LSWR could give three months' notice of doing so for £130,000 in cash and £100,000 in 4 per cent LSWR preference stock. The South Western Railway Act 1881 (44 & 45 Vict. c. ccix) of 22 August confirmed this, and the LSWR acquired the MHR on those terms on 30 June 1884.

=== No longer independent ===
The line continued in operation as a minor part of the LSWR system. As the LSWR had been operating the line, there was no outward indication of the change.

In 1923 the LSWR was transferred into the larger Southern Railway as part of the process known as the Grouping of the Railways, following the Railways Act 1921.

Prior to 1937, the Mid-Hants passenger service included trains from Waterloo to Southampton. There was one through train a day from Bournemouth to Margate via Alresford, Guildford and Redhill.

The fortunes of rural railway lines were not good, as road transport for agricultural produce became more efficient, and the low level of passenger and goods business declined. In July 1930 the passing loops at Ropley and Itchen Abbas were removed as an economy measure.

== Other lines at Butts Junction ==
=== Basingstoke and Alton Light Railway ===
On 1 June 1901 the Basingstoke and Alton Light Railway opened. It joined the Mid-Hants Railway by a junction called Butts Junction, a mile west of Alton. The line from Butts junction through Alton had been doubled in readiness, but Butts Junction handled three converging single lines.

The line was temporarily closed in 1916 to release materials for the war effort, resuming in 1924. It finally closed to passengers in 1932 and when goods traffic ceased in 1936 the line closed completely.

=== Meon Valley Line ===
Undeterred by the poor outcome of the Mid-Hants line, the LSWR promoted the Meon Valley Railway, which was to run between Alton and a junction at Fareham, giving access to Gosport and Stokes Bay, a pier for steamers to the Isle of Wight. It was opened in 1903. It too joined the Mid-Hants line at Butts Junction. Passenger train operation ended in 1955, and the goods train connection to a residual stub of the line at Alton was closed down in 1968.

=== Butts Junction simplification ===
The closure of the Basingstoke line meant that there were only two routes converging on Alton, and in 1935 Butts Junction signal box was abolished. The former double track from there to Alton became two single tracks: the Mid-Hants line and the Meon Valley line continued into Alton independently.

== Electric trains at Alton, and diesels on the MHR ==
On 4 July 1937 electric trains started operating to Alton (and to Portsmouth Direct). A frequent train service between Alton and London was operating, and the MHR was now a non-electrified extension. There was no operational convenience in running through trains from east of Alton on to the MHR, and so a shuttle passenger service operated by push and pull trains worked between Alton and Winchester.

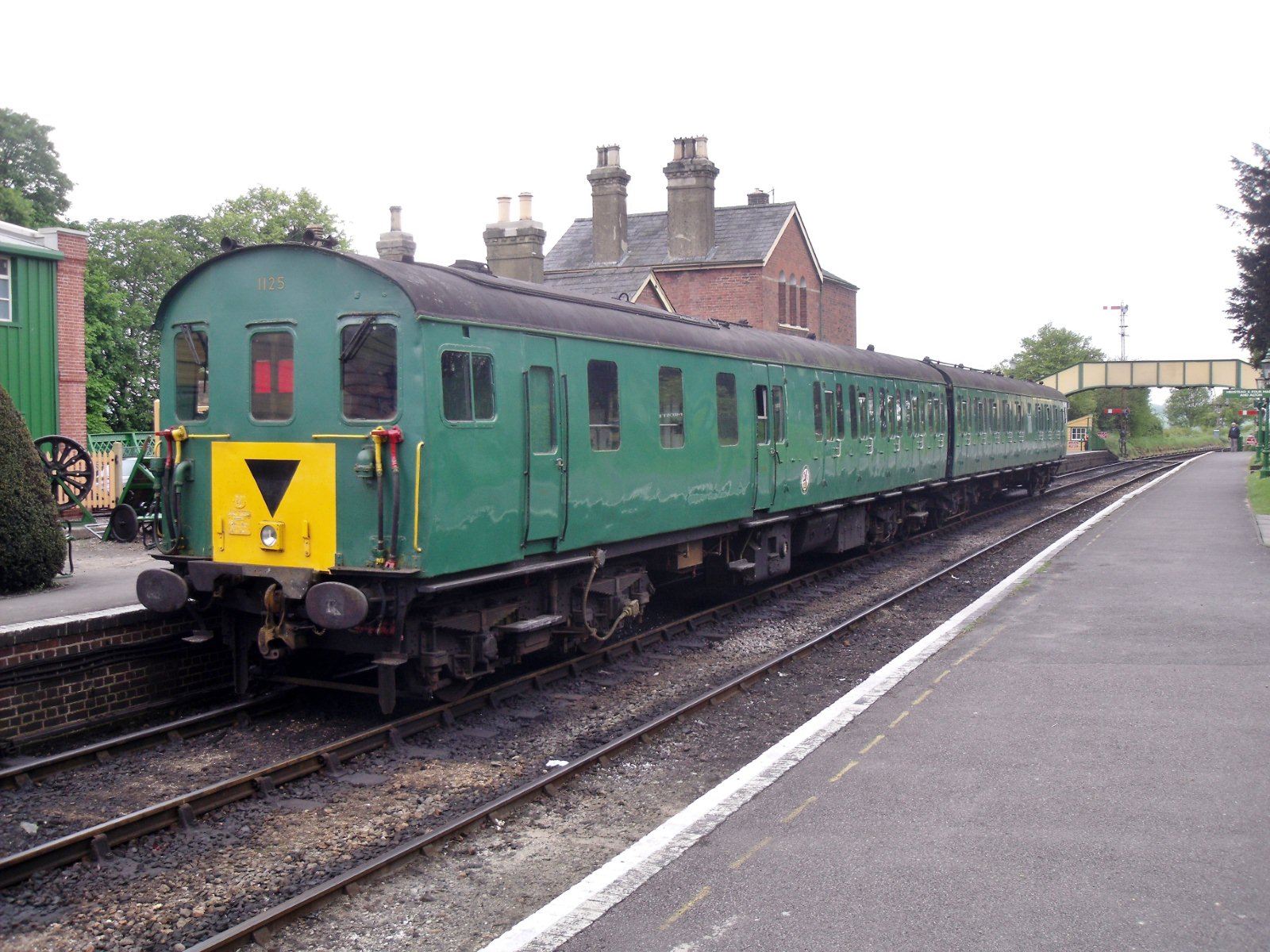
A Hampshire diesel electric multiple unit

After nationalisation of the railways in 1948, a programme of introduction of diesel traction was implemented, and local trains on the Hampshire group of services began to be operated by diesel-electric multiple units that came to be known as Hampshire units. After 3 November 1957 steam passenger operation ceased on the MHR route, and the Hampshire units took over. An hourly regular interval service operated seven days a week, and the journey time between Alton and Southampton Terminus was reduced from 75 minutes to 55. Good connections were made at Alton with London trains. Passenger numbers increased markedly: carryings were 50% up (from a very low base). At the same time goods business declined steeply.

== Diverted services, but ultimately closure ==
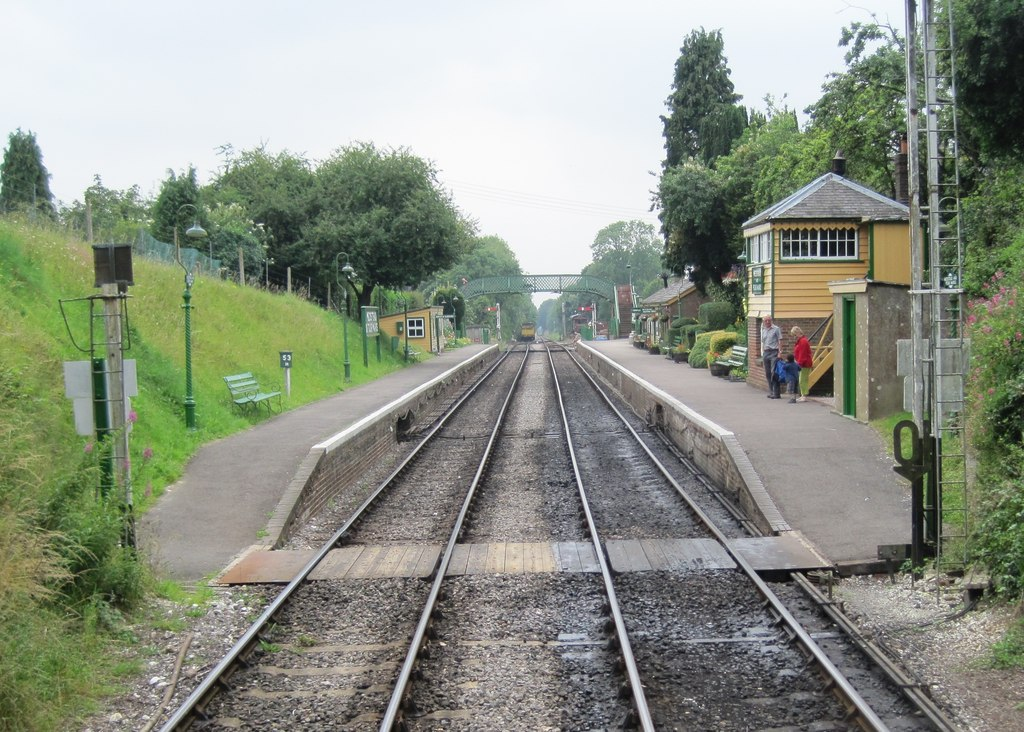
Medstead & Four Marks station in modern times

In the period 1963 to 1967, the process of electrification of the main Bournemouth line was under way, and frequently main line trains were diverted over the MHR.

The decline in ordinary use of the line continued, and moves were made to close it. After a considerable series of hearings and appeals, it was announced that last day of operation would be 4 February 1973.

== Heritage railway ==
Closure of the line on 5 February 1973 by British Rail did not mean the end of train operation on the line. A heritage operator, the Mid-Hants Railway Limited, was formed to preserve and operate the Alton to Alresford section. It opened from Alresford to Ropley on 30 April 1977, reached Medstead & Four Marks on 28 May 1983 and finally ran through to Alton, enabling cross-platform passenger interchange from British Rail trains there, on 25 May 1985.

== Topography ==
=== Gradients ===
The line climbed at 1 in 100 from Alton station, to Butts Junction, which itself was level, then stiffening to 1 in 60. The climb is five miles to Boyneswood summit, 652 feet above sea level. The line then falls at 1 in 60 for just over 2 miles, then almost continuously 1 in 80 to Winchester Road, a mile west of Alresford station. The fall was 437 feet in a little under 7 miles. From that point to Winchester includes some 1 in 100 gradients, but these are not consistent.

=== Locations ===
- Alton; relocated station to enable through running opened 2 October 1865; still open;
- Ropley; opened 2 October 1865; closed 5 February 1973;
- Medstead; opened 1868; renamed Medstead and Four Marks 1 October 1937; closed 5 February 1973;
- Alresford; opened 2 October 1865; closed 5 February 1973;
- Itchen Abbas; opened 2 October 1865; closed 5 February 1973;
- Winchester Junction; convergence with main line.
