= Jolliffe =

Jolliffe is a surname of Norman-French origin. Notable people with the surname include:

- Anne Jolliffe (1933–2021), Australian animator
- Arthur Jolliffe (1871–1944), British mathematician
- Charles Jolliffe (born 1972), Puerto Rican born actor and writer, "Crossing Styx" playwright
- Edmund Jolliffe (living), British composer
- Eric Jolliffe (1907–2001), Australian cartoonist and illustrator on outback themes
- Frances Jolliffe (1873–1925), American drama critic and suffragist
- Gray Jolliffe Graham Jolliffe (born 1937), British cartoonist and illustrator, "Wicked Willie"
- Hedworth Jolliffe, 2nd Baron Hylton (1829–1899), British Conservative politician
- Henry Jolliffe John Henry Jolliffe (1865–1936), English first-class cricketer
- Hylton Jolliffe (1773–1843), MP for Petersfield
- Hylton Jolliffe, 3rd Baron Hylton (1862–1945), British Conservative politician
- Jill Jolliffe (1945–2022), Australian journalist and author who has reported on East Timor
- John Jolliffe (disambiguation) includes:
  - John Jolliffe (merchant) (1613–1680), Member of Parliament for Heytesbury, Governor of the Levant and Muscovy Companies
  - John Jolliffe (of Petersfield) (c.1697–1771), lawyer and Member of Parliament for Petersfield
  - John Jolliffe (surgeon), ship's surgeon on HMS Pandora, for whom Mount Jolliffe, near Drury Inlet was named
  - John Jolliffe (librarian) (1929–1985), Bodley's Librarian from 1982 to 1985
  - John Hedworth Jolliffe (born 1935), British writer, son of William Jolliffe, 4th Baron Hylton
- Katrina A. Jolliffe, Australian organic chemist
- Dr Norman Joliffe, developer of the "Prudent Diet" on which the first WW International programs were based
- Raymond Jolliffe, 5th Baron Hylton (born 1932)
- Steve Jolliffe (born 1949), English rock musician.
- Ted Jolliffe Edward Bigelow Jolliffe QC (1909–1998), Canadian social democratic politician and lawyer from Ontario
- William Jolliffe, 1st Baron Hylton (1800–1876), British soldier and Conservative politician
- William Jolliffe, 4th Baron Hylton (1898–1967), British soldier
- William Jolliffe (censor) (1851–1927), New Zealand's first Chief Censor of Films
- William Jolliffe (1745–1802), British politician who sat in the House of Commons from 1768 to 1802
