= William Jolliffe =

William Jolliffe may refer to:

- William Joliffe (1622 – 1712), English merchant and politician
- William Jolliffe, 1st Baron Hylton, (1800–1876), known as Sir William Jolliffe, 1st Baronet, between 1821 and 1866, British Conservative Party politician
- William Jolliffe (censor), first Chief Censor of New Zealand
- William Jolliffe (died 1750), British Member of Parliament for Petersfield, 1734–1741
- William Jolliffe (1745–1802), British Member of Parliament for Petersfield, 1768–1802
- William Sydney Hylton Jolliffe (1841–1912), British Member of Parliament for Petersfield, 1874–1880
- William Jolliffe, 4th Baron Hylton (1898–1967), British peer and soldier

== See also ==
- Jolliffe
