= John Jolliffe =

John Jolliffe may refer to:

- John Jolliffe (merchant) (1613–1680), Member of Parliament for Heytesbury, Governor of the Levant and Muscovy Companies
- John Jolliffe (of Petersfield) (c. 1697–1771), lawyer and Member of Parliament for Petersfield
- John Jolliffe (surgeon), ship's surgeon on HMS Pandora, for whom Mount Jolliffe, near Drury Inlet in British Columbia was named
- John Jolliffe (librarian) (1929–1985), Bodley's Librarian from 1982 to 1985
- Hon. John Hedworth Jolliffe (1935–2025), British writer, son of William Jolliffe, 4th Baron Hylton

Rear Admiral John Jolliffe, U.S. Navy (retired). 1975-2015. USNA 1979

== See also ==
- Jolliffe
