= Joseph Taylor (died 1759) =

British lawyer and politician

Joseph Taylor (c. 1679–1759), of Stanmore, Middlesex, was a British lawyer and Tory politician who sat in the House of Commons from 1727 to 1734.

Taylor was probably a posthumous son of Joseph Taylor, merchant and draper of Queen Street, London and his second wife Hannah Rolt. He was admitted at Middle Temple in 1697 and at Inner Temple, and was called to the bar in 1707. He became Clerk of Bridewell and Bethlehem Hospitals in 1707. He acted as counsel to Lord Oxford during his impeachment in 1715.

Taylor was legal adviser and executor to Edward Gibbon, the grandfather of Edward Gibbon the historian, and stood unsuccessfully for Parliament at Petersfield at the 1722 general election on the interest of the elder Gibbon. He was returned as Tory Member of Parliament for Petersfield at a by-election on 28 January 1727, but was unseated on petition on 9 May 1727. He was then returned unopposed at the 1727 general election, and voted regularly against the Government. On 23 February 1733 he spoke against Walpole's motion to issue £500,000 out of the sinking fund towards the supply for the coming year. Gibbon's son Edward took over the seat at Petersfield for himself at the 1734 general election and Taylor did not stand again.

Lord Chesterfield consulted Taylor regarding a legacy of £50,000 left to his wife Melusina von der Schulenberg by her reputed father, George I, which George II, had suppressed, and Taylor is said to have been successful on his behalf by threatening to bring the matter before the ecclesiastical court.

Taylor died unmarried on 19 May 1759, aged about 80. One of his legatees was William Williamson, whom he described as ‘formerly my clerk and now at Carolina’ and who was said to be his illegitimate son. He left his estate to his ‘kinswoman, Mrs. Charlotte Williamson who lives with me’ who was probably Williamson's sister.

Parliament of Great Britain
Preceded by Norton Powlett; Edmund Miller	Member of Parliament for Petersfield; 1727; With: Norton Powlett	Succeeded by Norton Powlett; Edmund Miller
Preceded by Norton Powlett; Edmund Miller	Member of Parliament for Petersfield; 1727–1734; With: Norton Powlett	Succeeded by Sir William Jolliffe; Edward Gibbon
