= Robert Rithe =

Member of the Parliament of England

Robert Rithe was MP for Petersfield from 1571 to 1572.

Parliament of Great Britain
Preceded by Tomas Dering	Member of Parliament for Petersfield; 1571–1572; With: John Cowper	Succeeded by Ralph Bourchier
