= Sir Henry Norton, 2nd Baronet =

Sir Henry Norton, 2nd Baronet (ca. 1632 – ca. 1690) was an English politician who sat in the House of Commons in 1659.

Norton was the son of Sir Gregory Norton, 1st Baronet one of the regicides of King Charles I. He was disinherited by his father for opposing the trial and execution of the King. He succeeded to the baronetcy on the death of his father as his elder brother had predeceased his father.

In 1659, Norton was elected Member of Parliament for Petersfield in the Third Protectorate Parliament.

Norton married Mabella Norton, daughter of Sir Richard Norton, 1st Baronet of Rotherfield.

Parliament of England
Preceded by Not represented in Second Protectorate Parliament	Member of Parliament for Petersfield; 1659; With: Sir Josiah Child, Bt	Succeeded by Not represented in Restored Rump
Baronetage of England
Preceded by Gregory Norton	Baronet (of Charlton); 1652–c. 1690	Extinct
