= Lawrence Elveden =

Member of the Parliament of England

Lawrence Elveden (alias Cattaneo) (1512–1552) was the joint first MP for Petersfield.

Parliament of Great Britain
Preceded by (Joint) First incumbent	Member of Parliament for Petersfield; 1547–1552; With: George Tadlowe	Succeeded by John Vaughan
