= Thomas Bilson (died 1692) =

Thomas Bilson (1655–1692) was an MP for Petersfield during the late 17th century.

Bilson's father Leonard had been the Petersfield's MP from 1667 to 1681. He was admitted to Lincoln's Inn in 1673. In 1678 he married Susannah née Legg.

Parliament of Great Britain
Preceded by Leonard Bilson	Member of Parliament for Petersfield; 1685–1690; With: John Norton; Robert Michell	Succeeded by Richard Holt
