= Richard Norton (MP for Petersfield) =

Member of the Parliament of England

Richard Norton was MP for Petersfield from 1572 to 1583.

Parliament of Great Britain
Preceded by John Cowper	Member of Parliament for Petersfield; 1572–1583; With: Ralph Bourchier; Thomas Chatterton	Succeeded by Henry Weston
