= Henry Weston (politician) =

Member of the Parliament of England

Henry Weston (1534–1592) was a sixteenth century landowner and MP.

== Life ==
He was the only son of Sir Francis Weston, who was executed for an alleged dalliance with Anne Boleyn, and his wife Anne (d.1582), daughter and heiress of Sir Christopher Pickering of Killington, Cumbria and his wife Jane Lewkenor. Following his father's death, his mother married Sir Henry Knyvet (d. 1547) and John Vaughan (died 1577). He was left a considerable estate by his grandfather Sir Richard Weston (d. 1542), although because of his father's attainder his inheritance was not confirmed until he was restored in the blood in 1539. This inheritance included Sutton Place, Surrey, which became Weston's main residence. His grandfather had been Treasurer of Calais under Henry VIII and in 1557/8 Weston was himself part of the garrison defending the town during the siege, when it was retaken by the French. The following year he was made a Knight of the Bath at the coronation of Elizabeth I and married Dorothy, daughter of Thomas Arundell of Wardour Castle and Catherine Howard's sister Margaret. The following year the queen visited Sutton Place during her summer progress.

Weston became a Justice of the Peace early in Elizabeth's reign and served as High Sheriff of Surrey in 1568-9. He also inherited the borough of Petersfield, Hampshire from his grandfather, for which he sat as MP in every parliament between 1554 and 1584, except in 1571 when he was chosen as one of the knights of the shire for Surrey.

Despite his wealth, connection to the queen and public employments, Weston's influence in Surrey was less than might have been expected. This was presumably due to his sympathy with Catholicism. Although not openly a recusant, he was included in a list of likely supporters of Mary, Queen of Scots in 1574 and suspected of harbouring a priest in 1591. Despite this Elizabeth I visited Sutton Place for a second time in 1591.

He died in April 1592 and was buried in Holy Trinity Church, Guildford.

== Family ==
By his wife Dorothy Arundell he was the father of Richard Weston (MP for Petersfield) and a daughter Elizabeth, who died unmarried.

After Dorothy's death he married Elizabeth, daughter of Sir Francis Lovell of Harling, Norfolk and widow of Henry Repps (d.1566), of West Walton, Norfolk.

Parliament of Great Britain
Preceded by George Rithe	Member of Parliament for Petersfield; 1554–1559; With: John Vaughan (died 1577); George Rithe; Christopher Rithe; Tomas Dering	Succeeded by John Cowper
Preceded by Charles Howard	Member of Parliament for Surrey; 1571–1572; With: William More (died 1600)	Succeeded by Charles Howard
Preceded by Richard Norton	Member of Parliament for Petersfield; 1584–1586; With: John Vaughan (died 1577); Edmund Marvyn	Succeeded by Edward Radclyffe
