= Sir Benjamin Tichborne, 1st Baronet =

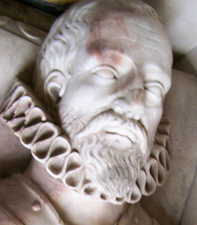
- Effigy of Sir Benjamin Tichborne on his funerary monument in St Andrew's church in Tichborne, Hampshire

MP for Petersfield
- In office 1588–1592

MP for Hampshire
- In office 1593–?

Personal details
- Born: 1542 England
- Died: 6 September 1621 (aged 78-79) England

Sir Benjamin Tichborne, 1st Baronet (c. 1542 – 6 September 1621) was an English landowner, courtier and politician who sat in the House of Commons at various times between 1588 and 1593.

== Biography ==
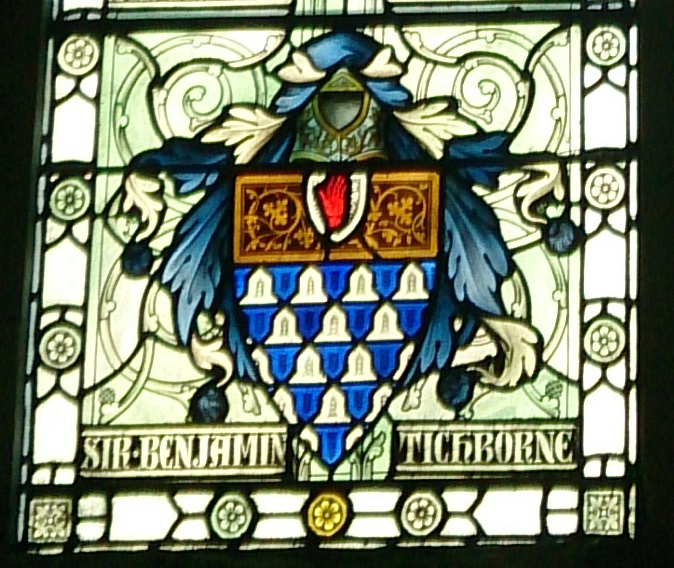
Sir Benjamin Tichborne's coat of arms in Window 7 of the Winchester Castle Great Hall, below that of Francis Walsingham

Tichborne was the son of Nicholas Tichborne, of Tichborne, Hampshire and his second wife Elizabeth Rythe, sister of James Rythe. He was Sheriff of Hampshire from 1579 to 1580.

In 1588, he was elected Member of Parliament for Petersfield. He was elected MP for Hampshire in 1593. He was knighted by Queen Elizabeth at Tichborne when she was on her way to Basing in 1601.

He was Sheriff of Hampshire again from 1602 to 1603 in which capacity he proclaimed the accession of James I in March 1603 at Winchester.

He was Gentleman of the Privy Chamber to King James, who visited Tichborne on several occasions, and gave him the Castle of Winchester in fee farm. He was created baronet on 8 March 1621. Tichborne died on 6 September 1621, and was buried at Tichborne, Hampshire.

Tichborne married firstly to a Miss Shelley, of Mapledurham, Oxfordshire. She died without issue. He married, secondly, by licence dated 17 May 1571, Amphillis Weston, daughter of Richard Weston, of Skreens, Essex.

== Issue ==
Sir Benjamin had four sons and at least three daughters by his second marriage:

1. Sir Richard Tichborne, 2nd Baronet
2. Walter Tichborne (1580–1640), knighted, married 1597 to Mary White (c. 1581–1620) daughter of Robert White of Aldershot; Walter built Aldershot Manor House now in Aldershot Park. His great-great-grandson inherited the baronetcy.
3. Benjamin (circa 1586-1665), knighted in 1618 at Tichborne Park by King James I. He died without issue. Lived at West Tisted Manor where he is buried. He is reported to have fought for the Royalist cause at the Battle of Cheriton (1644) and afterwards hidden in a hollow oak tree in West Tisted.
4. Henry, knighted, moved to Ireland and was involved in the Siege of Drogheda 1641.
5. Elizabeth, married first Robert Garth (died 1612) (separated c. 1602) She married secondly William Owen
6. Ann, married firstly William Brock of Longwood, a descendant of the Arundells of Wardour, who intermarried with the Tichbornes several times. Ann married secondly William Timperley.
7. Amphilis married Sir William Gratwicke (knighted 1607) of Ulverston, Lancashire and Tortington, Sussex.

Parliament of England
Preceded by Edward Radclyffe; Edmund Marvyn	Member of Parliament for Petersfield; 1588; With: Edmund Marvyn	Succeeded by Sir Walter Covert; Richard Weston
Preceded by George Carey; Thomas West	Member of Parliament for Hampshire; 1593; With: George Carey	Succeeded by Thomas Fleming; Richard Mill
Baronetage of England
New creation	Baronet (of Tichborne); 1621–1629	Succeeded by Richard Tichborne
