= Walter Covert =

English politician

Sir Walter Covert (c. 1544 – 27 January 1632) was an English politician who sat in the House of Commons several times during the late sixteenth and early seventeenth centuries.

Covert was the eldest surviving son of Richard Covert of Slaugham, Sussex. He was educated at Gray's Inn in 1567. He was knighted in 1591.

He was appointed High Sheriff of Surrey and Sussex for 1583–84 and 1592–93. In 1581, 1586, 1614 and 1626 he was elected Member of Parliament (MP) for Sussex, in 1584 for Newport, Cornwall and in 1593 for Petersfield.

He married twice: firstly Timothea, the daughter of John Lennard of Chevening, Kent and secondly Jane, the daughter and coheiress of Sir John Shurley of Isfield, Sussex. He died childless and was succeeded by his niece, who outlived him by only a few months. His widow remarried as her second husband John Freke, and as her third the statesman Denzil Holles, 1st Baron Holles.

Parliament of England
Preceded by John Jeffrey; Thomas Shirley	Member of Parliament for Sussex; 1581–1583; With: Thomas Shirley	Succeeded by Robert Sackville; Sir Thomas Shirley
Preceded by George Basset; William Marbury	Member of Parliament for Newport; 1584–1585; With: Robert Mordaunt	Succeeded by John Osborne; Edward Winter
Preceded by Robert Sackville; Sir Thomas Shirley	Member of Parliament for Sussex; 1586–1587; With: Thomas Pelham	Succeeded by Sir Thomas Palmer; Henry Neville
Preceded by Benjamin Tichborne; Edmund Marvyn	Member of Parliament for Petersfield; 1593; With: Richard Weston	Succeeded by William Kingswell; Thomas Hanbury
Preceded by Charles Howard; Henry Carey	Member of Parliament for Sussex; 1614; With: Sampson Lennard	Succeeded by Sir Edward Sackville; Christopher Neville
Preceded by Sir Thomas Pelham, 2nd Baronet; Sir John Shurley	Member of Parliament for Sussex; 1626; With: Sir Alexander Temple	Succeeded by Sir William Goring, 1st Baronet; Richard Lewknor
