= Edward Gibbon (disambiguation) =

Edward Gibbon (1737–1794) was an English historian and politician.

Edward Gibbon may also refer to:

- Edward Gibbon (died 1770) (1707–1770), British Member of Parliament
- Edward Gibbon (1707-1770), see Francis Fane of Brympton

== See also ==
- Edward Gibbons, English composer and choirmaster (1568–1650)
