= John Cawley =

John Cawley may refer to:

- John Calley (engineer) (1663–1725), or Cawley, metalworker, plumber and glass-blower
- John Cawley (priest) (1632–1709), Anglican priest
