= Thomas Chatterton (MP) =

English politician

Thomas Chatterton was MP for Petersfield from 1572 to 1583.

Parliament of Great Britain
Preceded by John Cowper	Member of Parliament for Petersfield; 1572–1583; With: Richard Norton (MP for Petersfield)	Succeeded by Edmund Marvyn
