= Norton baronets =

Extinct baronetcy in the Baronetage of England

There are four extinct baronetcies created for persons with the surname Norton: two in the Baronetage of England, one in the Baronetage of Ireland and one in the Baronetage of Nova Scotia.

The Norton Baronetcy, of Rotherfield in the County of Southampton, was created in the Baronetage of England on 18 May 1622 for Richard Norton, Member of Parliament for Petersfield. The third Baronet represented Hampshire and Petersfield in Parliament. The title became extinct on his death in 1687.

The Norton Baronetcy, of Charlton in the County of Berkshire, was created in the Baronetage of Ireland on 27 April 1624 for Gregory Norton, subsequently Member of Parliament for Midhurst and one of the regicides of Charles I. His eldest surviving son, Henry, the second Baronet, was disinherited by his father after opposing the execution of Charles I and later represented Petersfield in Parliament. The title became extinct on Sir Henry's death in circa 1690.

The Norton Baronetcy, of Cheston in the County of Suffolk, was created in the Baronetage of Nova Scotia on 18 June 1635 for Walter Norton. The title became extinct on the death of the second Baronet in circa 1673.

The Norton Baronetcy, of Coventry in the County of Warwick, was created in the Baronetage of England on 23 July 1661 for Thomas Norton. The title became extinct on his death in 1691.

== Norton baronets, of Rotherfield (1622) ==
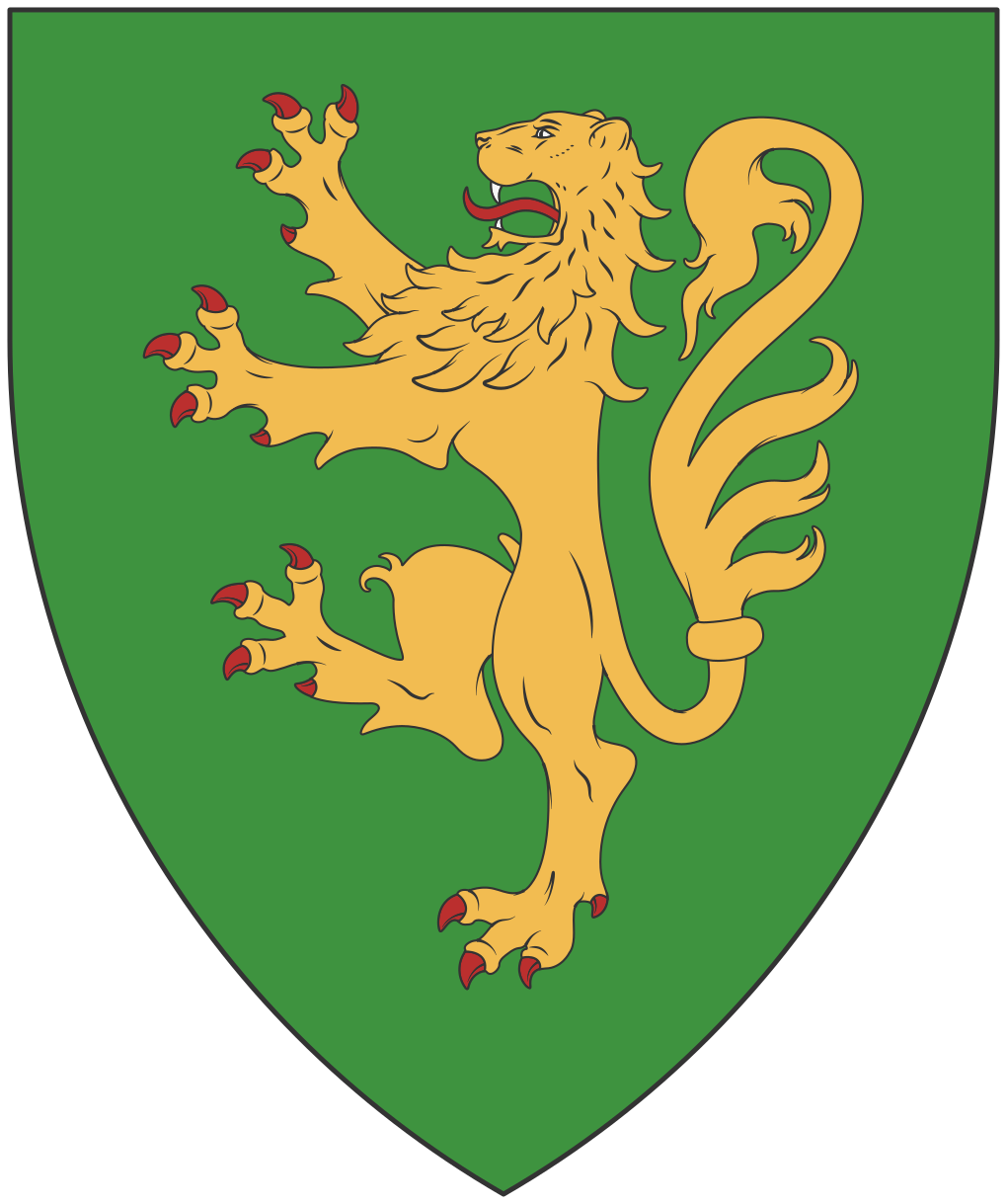
Arms of Norton of Rotherfield

- Sir Richard Norton, 1st Baronet (1582–c. 1645)
- Sir Richard Norton, 2nd Baronet (1619–1652)
- Sir John Norton, 3rd Baronet (1619–1687)

== Norton baronets, of Charlton (1624) ==
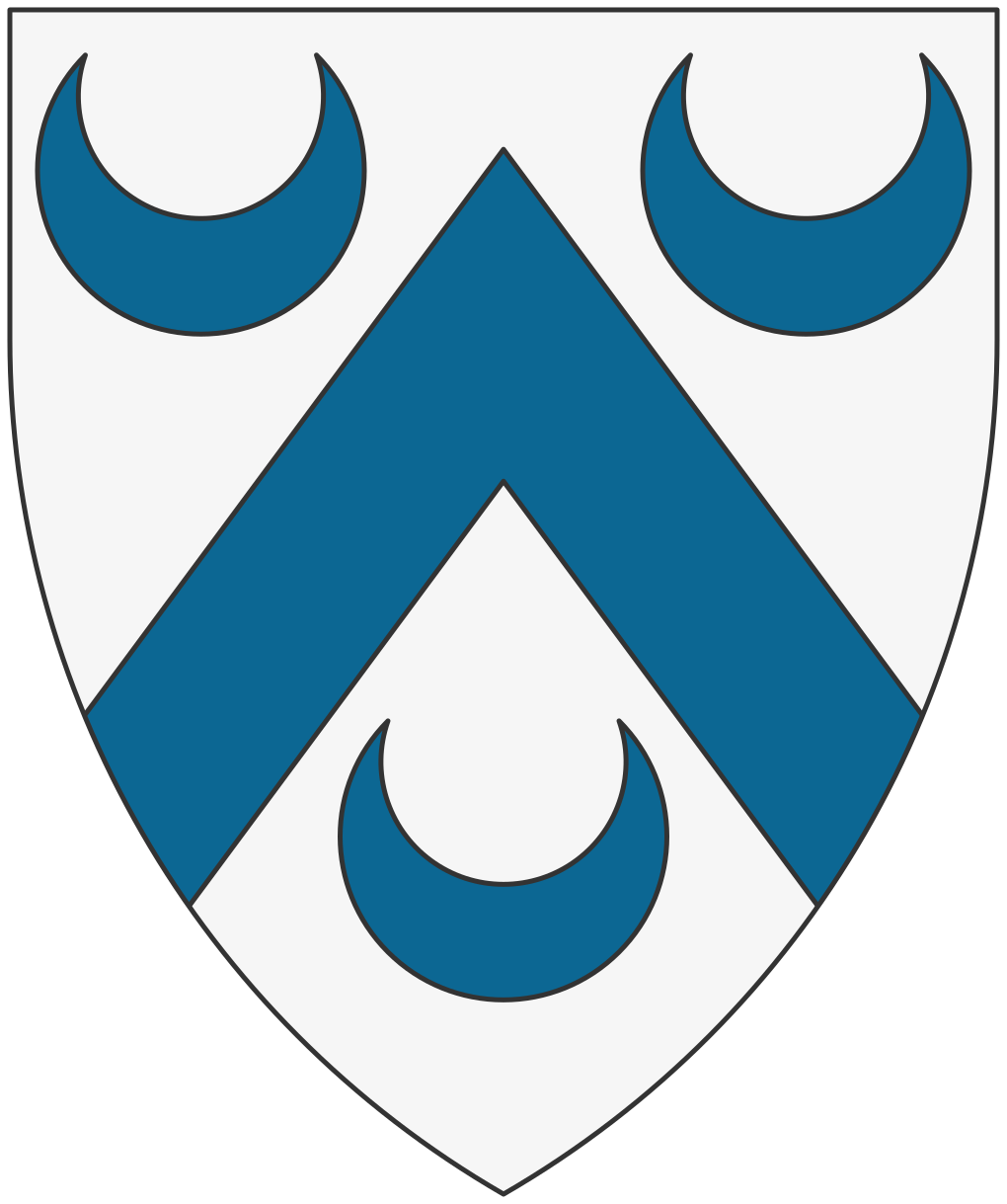
Arms of Norton of Charlton

- Sir Gregory Norton, 1st Baronet (died 1652)
- Sir Henry Norton, 2nd Baronet (died c. 1690)

== Norton baronets, of Cheston (1635) ==
- Sir Walter Norton, 1st Baronet (died c. 1656)
- Sir Edward Norton, 2nd Baronet (died c. 1673)

== Norton baronets, of Coventry (1661) ==
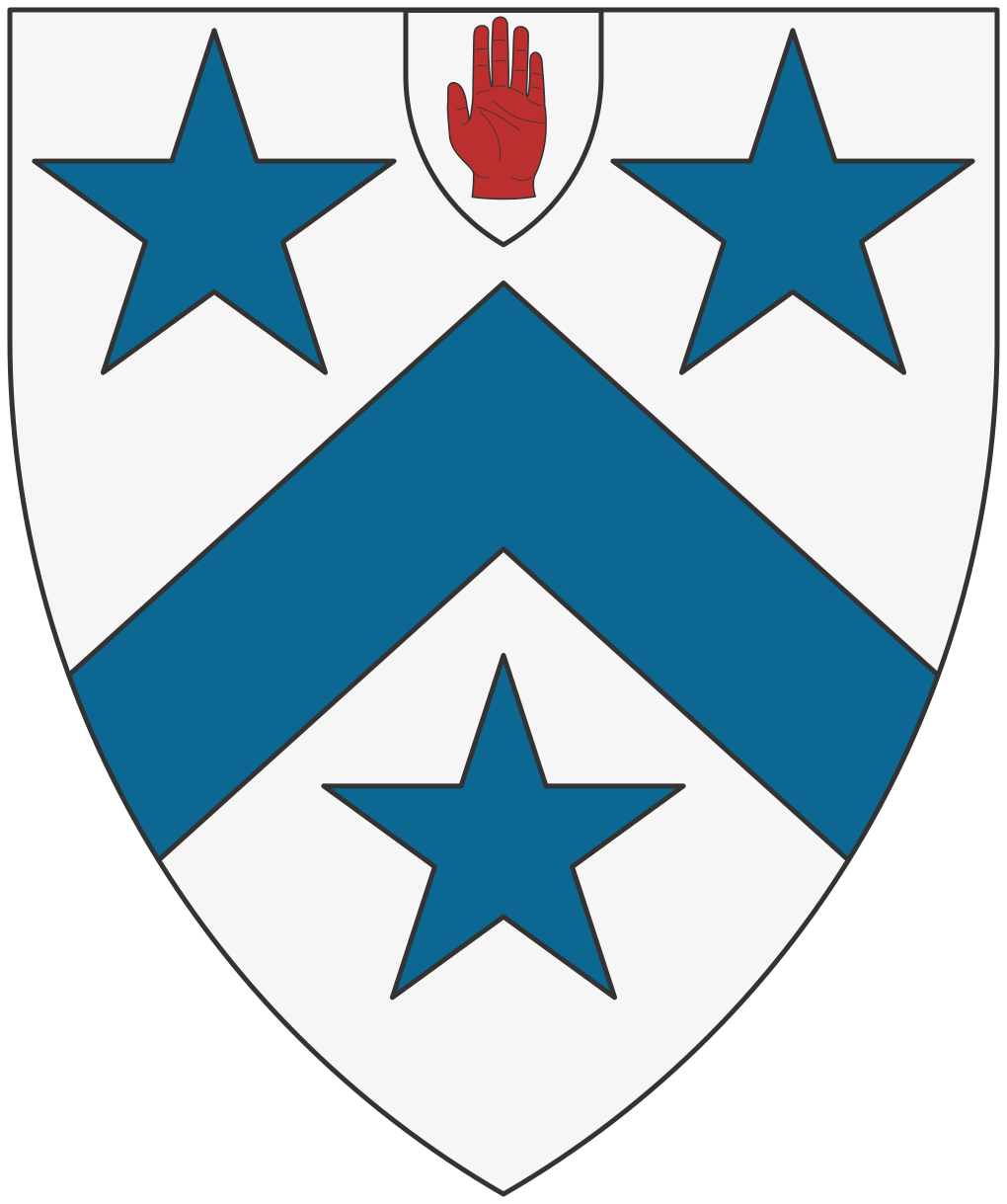
Arms of the Norton of Coventry.

- Sir Thomas Norton, 1st Baronet (c. 1616–1691)
