= George Rithe =

Member of the Parliament of England

George Rithe (c. 1523–1561) was MP for Petersfield from October 1553 to April 1554, and then again from 1559 until his death.

A lawyer, he was from Northington.

Parliament of Great Britain
Preceded by Lawrence Elveden (alias Cattaneo)	Member of Parliament for Petersfield; 1553–1554; With: Anthony Browne	Succeeded by Henry Weston
Preceded by Christopher Rithe	Member of Parliament for Petersfield; 1559–1561; With: Henry Weston	Succeeded by Tomas Dering
