= 1866 Petersfield by-election =

UK parliamentary by-election

A by-election was held in Petersfield on Monday 23 July 1866.

The previous incumbent Sir William Jolliffe had been raised to the peerage as Baron Hylton, of Hylton in the County Palatine of Durham and of Petersfield in the County of Southampton.

The election took place at Petersfield Town Hall, then in front of St Peter's Church. The Mayor S.W. Seaward presided and called for someone to propose "A fit and proper person to represent the town in parliament". The MP for Winchester, John Bonham-Carter proposed William Nicholson with a Mr Elkington seconding. There being no other candidate, Nicholson was declared elected.
