= Christopher Rithe =

Christopher Rithe (c. 1531–1606) was MP for Petersfield from October 1555 to 1559.

A lawyer, he was from Northington.

Parliament of England
Preceded by John Vaughan	Member of Parliament for Petersfield; 1555–1559; With: Henry Weston	Succeeded by George Rithe
Preceded by First incumbent	Member of Parliament for Haslemere; 1584–1586; With: Marlyon Rithe	Succeeded by William Morgan
