= Joan Quennell =

British politician

Member of Parliament for Petersfield
- In office 17 November 1960 – 20 September 1974
- Preceded by: Peter Legh
- Succeeded by: Michael Mates

Personal details
- Born: Joan Mary Quennell; 23 December 1923
- Died: 2 July 2006 (aged 82)
- Party: Conservative

Joan Mary Quennell (23 December 1923 – 2 July 2006) was a British Conservative politician who served as the Member of Parliament for Petersfield from 1960 to 1974.

== Early life ==
The daughter of Walter Quennell, a builder and developer, Quennell was educated at Bedales School, Petersfield, and served with the Women's Land Army during World War II.

== Career ==
Quennell was the manager of a mixed dairy and arable farm and served as a West Sussex County Councillor 1951–61. She was a governor of Crawley College of Further Education, and served as a J.P.

First elected to Parliament at the 1960 Petersfield by-election, Quennell had been chairman of the Horsham Divisional Conservative Association. She stood down from parliament in the October 1974 general election, and continued to live at the family home near Rogate until her death.

== Death ==
Quennell died in hospital in Chichester on 2 July 2006, having had recurring bouts of poor health since suffering a stroke a few years earlier. Her remains were cremated.

Quennell bequeathed her Dangstein estate, near Rogate, to the National Trust. In 2008, the Trust sold the estate to new owners who dismissed the staff and evicted tenants at the end of their agreements resulting in allegations that the Trust had not complied with Quennell's wishes.

== Family ==
Her uncle was the architect and writer C. H. B. Quennell, whose son, her cousin, was the writer Sir Peter Quennell.

Parliament of the United Kingdom
Preceded by Sir Peter Legh	Member of Parliament for Petersfield; 1960–Oct 1974	Succeeded by Michael Mates
