= William Cawley =

English politician (1602–1667)

William Cawley, MP

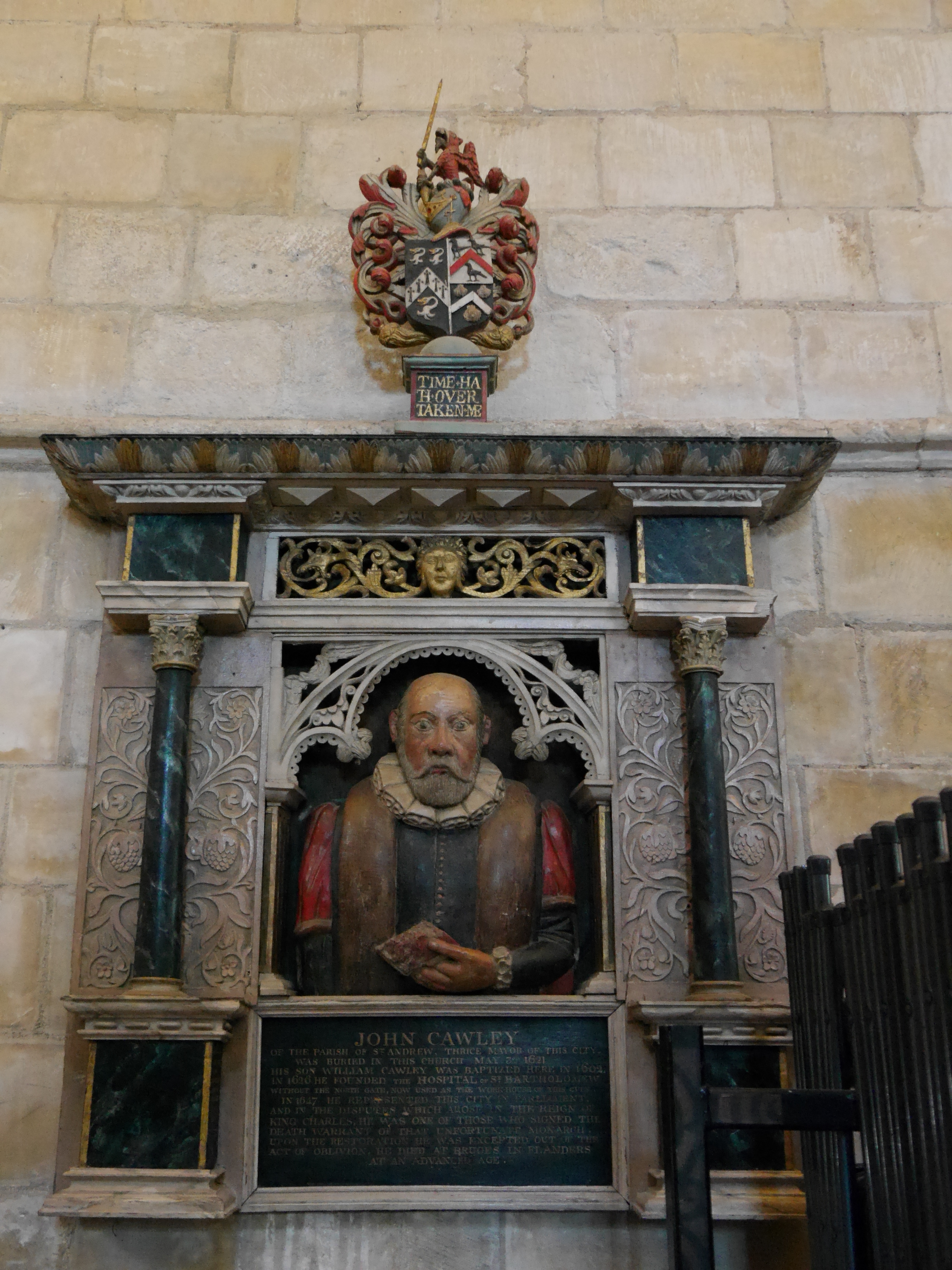
Mural monument in Chichester Cathedral to John Cawley (d.1621), thrice Mayor of Chichester, and to his son William Cawley, the regicide

William Cawley (1602 – January 1667) was a regicide and seventeenth century English politician. He was born in Chichester in 1602, the son of John Cawley, a wealthy brewer, and was educated at The Prebendal School, Oxford University and Gray's Inn.

In 1625, he provided funds for the erection of almshouses on the east side of New Broyle Road. They were intended to provide homes for twelve decayed tradesmen of Chichester. By 1681, there is reference to the use of the building as a workhouse.

Cawley was elected Member of Parliament for Chichester in 1628 and for Midhurst in 1640. In 1649, Cawley was appointed to the High Court of Justice and after attending all the sittings in Westminster Hall signed King Charles I's death warrant. He was appointed to several standing committees including the army committee, the committee for the advance of money, the committee for plundered ministers, and the committee for compounding.

Cawley was elected to the Council of State in 1651 and again in 1652.

After the Restoration of King Charles II in 1660, Cawley was exempted from pardon and fled abroad first to the Netherlands and then to Switzerland, where he joined fellow regicides Edmund Ludlow and Nicholas Love. Willam Cawley died in Vevey, Switzerland in 1667.

He married firstly Catherine Walrond and had four children, including William Cawley MP and John Cawley, Archdeacon of Lincoln. His second wife was called Mary.

Parliament of England
Preceded by Edward Dowse; Humphrey Haggett	Member of Parliament for Chichester; 1628–1629; With: Henry Bellingham	Parliament suspended until 1640
Preceded by Robert Long; Thomas May	Member of Parliament for Midhurst; 1641–1653; With: Thomas May 1641–1642; Gregory Norton 1645–1653	Not represented in Barebones Parliament
