= Tomas Dering =

Member of the Parliament of England

Tomas Dering was MP for Petersfield from 1563 to April 1571.

Parliament of Great Britain
Preceded by George Rithe	Member of Parliament for Petersfield; 1563–1571; With: Henry Weston	Succeeded by Robert Rithe
