= Peter Bettesworth =

English politician (1670–1738)

Peter Bettesworth (1670–1738) was an MP for Petersfield during the late 17th and early 18th centuries.

He was the son of Peter Bettesworth of Chidden and Elizabeth née Roberts. In 1673 he married Sandys, daughter of Sir James Worsley, 5th Baronet: They had one son. After his time as MP he pursued a military career. His last post was as Lieutenant Governor of Jersey.

Parliament of England
Preceded by Richard Holt	Member of Parliament for Petersfield; 1698–1701; With: Robert Michell	Succeeded by Richard Markes
