= Thomas May (Royalist) =

English politician (c.1604–1655)

Thomas May (c. 1604–1655) was an English politician who sat in the House of Commons from 1640 to 1642. He supported the Royalist cause in the English Civil War.

May, of Rawmere, in Mid Lavant, Sussex, was a nephew of Sir Humphrey May and grandson of Richard May rich Merchant Taylor of London.

In April 1640, May was elected Member of Parliament for Midhurst in the Short Parliament. He was re-elected MP for Midhurst for the Long Parliament in November 1640. On the outbreak of the Civil War, he put a garrison into Chichester and was disabled from sitting in parliament on 23 November 1642. His estates were subsequently sequestered and restored when he paid a fine of £900 for his delinquency in February 1647.

Parliament of England
Parliament suspended since 1629	Member of Parliament for Midhurst; 1640–1642; With: Sir Robert Long, 1st Baronet 1640; Dr Chaworth 1640–1641; William Cawley 1641–1642	Succeeded by William Cawley; Sir Gregory Norton, 1st Baronet
