= Ralph Bucknall =

English Member of Parliament (died c1711)

Ralph Bucknall was a M.P. for Petersfield.

In 1697 Bucknall became Lord of the Manor of Petersfield. In 1670 he married Elizabeth, daughter of John Birch of Whitbourne, Herefordshire: they had 1 son and 3 daughters. A brewer by trade he also had a government commission for carrying on the manufacture of linen and paper in Jersey and Guernsey.

Parliament of Great Britain
Preceded by Robert Michell	Member of Parliament for Petersfield; February; 1701 – November; 1701; With: Richard Markes	Succeeded by Robert Michell
