= John Cowper (MP) =

Member of the Parliament of England

John Cowper was MP for Petersfield from 1571 to 1572.

Parliament of Great Britain
| Preceded by Henry Weston | Member of Parliament for Petersfield; 1571–1572; With: Robert Rithe | Succeeded by Richard Norton |
