= Edmund Miller =

Edmund Miller (1669– 1 August 1730) was an MP for Petersfield during the first half of the 18th century.

Miller was born at Marsworth, the son of John Miller and Bridget née West. He was educated at Eton College and Trinity College, Cambridge. He was elected a Fellow of Trinity in 1692. He studied at Lincoln's Inn, migrated to The Temple and was called to the bar in 1699.

Parliament of Great Britain
Preceded by Samuel Pargiter-Fuller	Member of Parliament for Petersfield; 1722–1726; With: Norton Powlett	Succeeded by Joseph Taylor
Preceded by Joseph Taylor	Member of Parliament for Petersfield; 9 May 1727–17 July; 17271702; With: Norton Powlett	Succeeded by Joseph Taylor
