= Norton Powlett (died 1741) =

English Member of Parliament (born 1680)

- Born: September 27, 1680; Amport, Hampshire, England
- Died: June 18, 1741 (aged 60); Hampshire, England
- Occupations: Landowner, Whig politician
- Years active: 1705–1734
- Known for: Member of Parliament for Petersfield

Norton Powlett (1680–1741) of Rotherfield Park and Amport, Hampshire, was a British landowner and Whig politician. He sat in the House of Commons for nearly 30 years from 1705 to 1734.

== Early life ==
Powlett was baptized on 27 September 1680, the only son of Francis Powlett. MP, of Amport, Hampshire and his wife Elizabeth Norton, daughter of Sir Richard Norton, 2nd Baronet of Rotherfield Park, Hampshire. In 1695 he succeeded his father and inherited Amport near Andover. Through his mother he also inherited the manors of East Tisted and Rotherfield. He matriculated at Corpus Christi College, Oxford on 26 May 1698, aged 17. He married Jane Morley, daughter of Sir Charles Morley in 1699. At the time of his marriage, his income was estimated at £2,000 per annum. These lands gave the family a strong electoral influence.

== Career ==
Powlett became a Freeman of Winchester by 1701 and a Freeman of Lymington in 1701. At the 1705 English general election, he was returned as Member of Parliament for Petersfield on his own interest. He was listed as a ‘Churchman’ and voted for the Court candidate for Speaker on 25 October 1705. He also voted with the Court on the ‘place clause’ in the regency bill in February 1706. He was among those ordered in February 1707 to prepare a bill for a turnpike on the Petersfield to Butser Hill road. At the 1708 British general election he was returned as a Whig MP for Petersfield. He continued to support his party in Parliament acting as teller on various occasions. In 1709, he supported the naturalization of the Palatines and in 1710 voted for the impeachment of Dr Sacheverell. He was returned again for Petersfield at the 1710 British general election. He acted as teller again and on 21 February 1711 was added to the drafting committee for a turnpike bill for the Petersfield to Portsmouth road. He followed this up by becoming commissioner of the Portsmouth and Sheet Turnpike trust for the rest of his life from 1711. He voted for the motion of ‘No Peace without Spain’ and against the French commerce bill on 18 June 1713. At the 1713 British general election, he was returned again for Petersfield. He voted against the expulsion of Richard Steele on 18 March 1714.

Powlett was returned again for Petersfield at the 1715 British general election. He remained a solid supporter of Whig administrations and voted with the Administration in every recorded division. He was returned again in 1722 and 1727 but lost his seat at the 1734 British general election. He stood again at Petersfield at the 1741 British general election, and was again defeated.

== Later life and legacy ==
Powlett became a trustee of Churcher's College, in 1737. He died on 18 June 1741. He and his wife had eight sons and three daughters. His eldest son, Norton, was MP for Winchester (UK Parliament constituency). His youngest son, George, eventually succeeded as 12th Marquess of Winchester.

Parliament of England
Preceded by Robert Michell; Leonard Bilson	Member of Parliament for Petersfield; 1705–1707; With: Leonard Bilson	Succeeded by Parliament of Great Britain
Parliament of Great Britain
Preceded by Parliament of England	Member of Parliament for Petersfield; 1707–1734; With: Leonard Bilson 1707-1715; Samuel Pargiter-Fuller 1715-1722; Edmund Miller 1722-1727; Joseph Taylor 1727; Edmund Miller 1727; Joseph Taylor 1727-1734	Succeeded by Sir William Jolliffe; Edward Gibbon
