= Cornthwaite Hector =

Politician, died 1842

Cornthwaite Hector (5 November 1773 – 14 February 1842) was the Radical Member of Parliament for Petersfield on two occasions during the 19th-century.

Born at Portsmouth, England, on 5 November 1773, Hector, a banker and brewer, formerly a steward to the Jolliffe family for 30 years, was first elected Member of Parliament for Petersfield in 1835. At the 1837 election, a petition was lodged against the winner, William Jolliffe, and his election declared void. After scrutiny of the ballots, Hector was declared elected in 1838.

He died at his home Stodham House, Petersfield. His grandson, Cornthwaite John Hector, was one of the founders of Melbourne, Florida, and its first postmaster.

Parliament of the United Kingdom
Preceded by Hylton Jolliffe	MP for Petersfield; 1835–1837	Succeeded by William Jolliffe, 1st Baron Hylton
Preceded by William Jolliffe, 1st Baron Hylton	Member of Parliament for Petersfield; 1838–1841	Succeeded by William Jolliffe, 1st Baron Hylton
