= Leonard Bilson (1681–1715) =

English Member of Parliament (died 1715)

Leonard Bilson (25 September 1681 – 28 June 1715) was an MP for Petersfield during the early 18th century.

He was the son of Thomas Bilson of West Mapledurham and Susanna née Legge. He was educated at New College, Oxford. He was Commissioner of the Portsmouth and Sheet Turnpike Trust from 1711; and a Freeman of Portsmouth, also from 1711.

Parliament of Great Britain
| Preceded by Richard Markes | Member of Parliament for Petersfield; 13 January 1704 - 28 June 1715; With: Robert Michell; Norton Powlett | Succeeded by Samuel Pargiter-Fuller |
