= Richard Holt (died 1710) =

English M.P. (1639–1710)

Richard Holt (1639–1710) was an English M.P. during the second half of the 17th century.

Holt was born in Portsmouth, the son of John Holt and Catherine née Bricket. He was educated at St John's College, Oxford. In 1667 he married Margaret Whithed of West Tytherley: they had two daughters. He was appointed a Freeman of Portsmouth in 1658; of Lymington in 1677; and of Winchester in 1695. He was Commissioner of Wastes and Spoils for the New Forest from 1692.

Parliament of Great Britain
| Preceded by Henry Dawley | Member of Parliament for Lymington; 1685–1690; With: John Burrard | Succeeded by Thomas Dore |
| Preceded by Thomas Bilson | Member of Parliament for Petersfield; 1690–1698; With: Robert Michell (MP for Petersfield); Robert Michell | Succeeded by Peter Bettesworth |
