= 1960 Petersfield by-election =

UK Parliamentary by-election

The 1960 Petersfield by election took place during the 1959 to 1964 parliament of the United Kingdom.

It was called when the sitting MP for Petersfield Peter Legh became the 4th Baron Newton on the death of his father . There were three candidates

- Joan Quennell, aged 36, a company director representing the Conservatives
- Michael Digby, 39, a Colonel in the Army, representing the Liberals
- William Royle, 39, a horticulturalist, representing Labour

Polling day took place on Thursday 17 November 1960 and the result was as follows

By Election 1960: Petersfield
Party	Candidate	Votes	%	±%
Conservative	Joan Quennell	15,613	54.40	−6.53
Liberal	Michael Digby	8,310	28.95	+11.17
Labour	William Royle	4,777	16.64	−4.65
Majority		7,303	25.45	−14.19
Turnout		28,700		
Conservative hold		Swing		

Quennell held the seat at three further general elections before retiring in October 1974.
