= Michael Mates =

British Conservative politician

The Right Honourable Michael Mates

Member of Parliament for East Hampshire Petersfield (1974–1983)
- In office 10 October 1974 – 12 April 2010
- Preceded by: Joan Quennell
- Succeeded by: Damian Hinds

Personal details
- Born: 9 June 1934 (age 92) Brentford, Middlesex, England
- Party: Conservative
- Spouse: Mary Rosamund Paton (m. 1959; div. 1980) Rosellen Bett (m. 1982; div. 1995) Christine Robinson-Moltke (m. 1998)
- Children: James Mates
- Education: King's College, Cambridge

Military service
- Allegiance: United Kingdom
- Branch/service: British Army
- Years of service: 1954–1974
- Rank: Lieutenant colonel
- Unit: Royal Ulster Rifles; 1st The Queen's Dragoon Guards

Michael John Mates (born 9 June 1934) is a Conservative Party politician who was the Member of Parliament (MP) for the constituency of East Hampshire from 1974 to 2010. He was a minister at the Northern Ireland Office from 1992 to 1993, resigning after his support for failed businessman (and later convicted thief) Asil Nadir damaged his reputation. After his long career at Westminster, Mates lost the election for police commissioner in Hampshire in August 2012.

== Early life and education ==
Mates was born on 9 June 1934 in Brentford, Middlesex, England. He was educated at Salisbury Cathedral School, Blundell's School and King's College, Cambridge, where he was a choral scholar.

== Career ==
=== Military, 1955–1974 ===
On 18 June 1955, Mates was commissioned into the Royal Ulster Rifles, British Army, as a second lieutenant. On 1 February 1957, he was promoted to lieutenant. On 3 January 1959, he transferred from a short service commission to a regular commission.

On 10 March 1961, Mates transferred from the Royal Ulster Rifles to 1st The Queen's Dragoon Guards. He was promoted to captain on 9 June 1961, and to major on 31 December 1967.

Prior to his election to the House of Commons, Mates served for twenty years in the British Army leaving in 1974 with the rank of lieutenant colonel with the 1st The Queen's Dragoon Guards.

=== Parliament, 1974–2010 ===
Michael Mates was a Member of Parliament for 35 years. He was first elected in the October 1974 general election for Petersfield in Hampshire, following the retirement of Joan Quennell. The constituency was renamed East Hampshire in 1983 and he continued to serve as MP until the 2010 general election, having announced his intention in 2006 not to stand again.

From 1992 to 1993, Mates was Minister of State at the Northern Ireland Office. He resigned after a scandal involving his links to fugitive businessman Asil Nadir. In his 28-minute resignation speech he defied Commons Speaker Betty Boothroyd by attacking the Serious Fraud Office’s handling of the case against Nadir in breach of Commons rules on sub judice. Nadir was eventually convicted in the case of ten counts of theft amounting to £29m.

Mates served as the chairman of the Defence (1987–1992) and Northern Ireland (2001–2005) select committees and chaired the All-Party Anglo-Irish Parliamentary Group. He was appointed a member of the Privy Council in February 2004.

=== Police Commissioner candidacy, 2012 ===
In July 2012 Mates was selected as the Conservative candidate in the election for Police and crime commissioner for Hampshire, notwithstanding his links to Asil Nadir who, in August 2012 was convicted of theft amounting to £29m. In the 1990s, when a junior minister in the Northern Ireland Office, Mates expressed his support for Nadir by sending him a watch inscribed with the words "don't let the buggers get you down" – a reference to an ongoing investigation by British authorities into Nadir's fraudulent financial activities. In August 2012 Nadir was found guilty at the Old Bailey of fraud, and convicted of stealing nearly £29 million. Despite this Mates maintained his support for Nadir, including testifying in his defence at the Old Bailey.

In September 2012 Michael Crick of Channel 4 News said that Mates had repeatedly refused to answer questions about a windfall he received having vacated a sitting tenancy at Dolphin Square, central London, when an MP. Two city councillors publicly stated that he should step down, while Conservative MP George Hollingbery, who oversaw the party's selection process for the commissioner candidates, said: "Michael Mates was selected after a transparent process involving both the public and party members. Michael is a candidate with a wealth of experience in high public office and the party believes he will make an excellent first police commissioner."

In 2012 Mates was reported to Hampshire Constabulary for electoral fraud under the Fraud Act 2006 by competitor Don Jerrard who was standing for The Justice & Anti-Corruption Party. The former lawyer wrote to the county's Chief Constable alleging that Mates breached the 2006 Fraud Act by giving his address as a house where he rents rooms in Winchester. Parallel to this, Hampshire police confirmed two complaints of alleged racist language in Mates' Election Statement were passed to the Thames Valley Police for investigation. Thames Valley Police were said to be getting ready to interview Mates, but it was not known whether this would be done under caution. Mates denied the allegations, saying he was the victim of a smear campaign. In 2014 Mates received an apology and undisclosed damages from the Crown Prosecution Service. He also received an apology from Hampshire Constabulary. Mates described the 18 months between the allegations and his vindication as "a nightmare".

== Controversies ==
The Panama Papers revealed that Mates was minority shareholder of an offshore investment company named Haylandale Limited from 2005 to at least April 2010, the end of his parliamentary period, and owned four subsidiary firms from August 2007 to December 2008 for leasing and services connected to luxury properties in The Bahamas. Mates had, however, previously declared that he was the remunerated Chairman of Haylandale, which undertook property development in the West Indies, in the Register of Members' Interests for the period of 2005 to 2010.

== Personal life ==
Michael Mates has been married three times: to Mary Rosamund Paton in 1959, divorced 1980; Rosellen Bett in 1982, divorced 1995; and Christine Robinson-Moltke in 1998. He is the father of James Mates, a senior reporter and presenter for ITN.

Partnered by composer William Godfree, Mates regularly performs tributes to Flanders and Swann, Noël Coward and others in aid of charity.

== See also ==
- Father Patrick Ryan

== Bibliography ==
- Mates, Michael The Secret Service: Is There A Case For Greater Openness? Alliance Publishers, 1989. ISBN 0-907967-07-8
- Hurd, Douglas & Mates, Michael et al. What's Wrong With British Foreign Policy? Tory Reform Group, 2007 ISBN 0-9555426-0-X

Parliament of the United Kingdom
Preceded by Joan Quennell	Member of Parliament for Petersfield; Oct 1974–1983	Constituency abolished See East Hampshire
New constituency before: Petersfield	Member of Parliament for East Hampshire; 1983 – 2010	Succeeded by Damian Hinds
