= Humphrey Radcliffe =

English landowner and politician

Member of Parliament for Bedfordshire and Maldon
- In office 1558

Personal details
- Died: 30 August 1566
- Spouse: Isabel (or Elizabeth) Harvey
- Children: 6, including Thomas, Edward and Mary
- Parents: Robert Radcliffe (father); Elizabeth Stafford (mother)
- Relatives: Henry Stafford (grandfather)

Humphrey Radcliffe (died 30 August 1566) was an English landowner and Member of Parliament.

== Biography ==
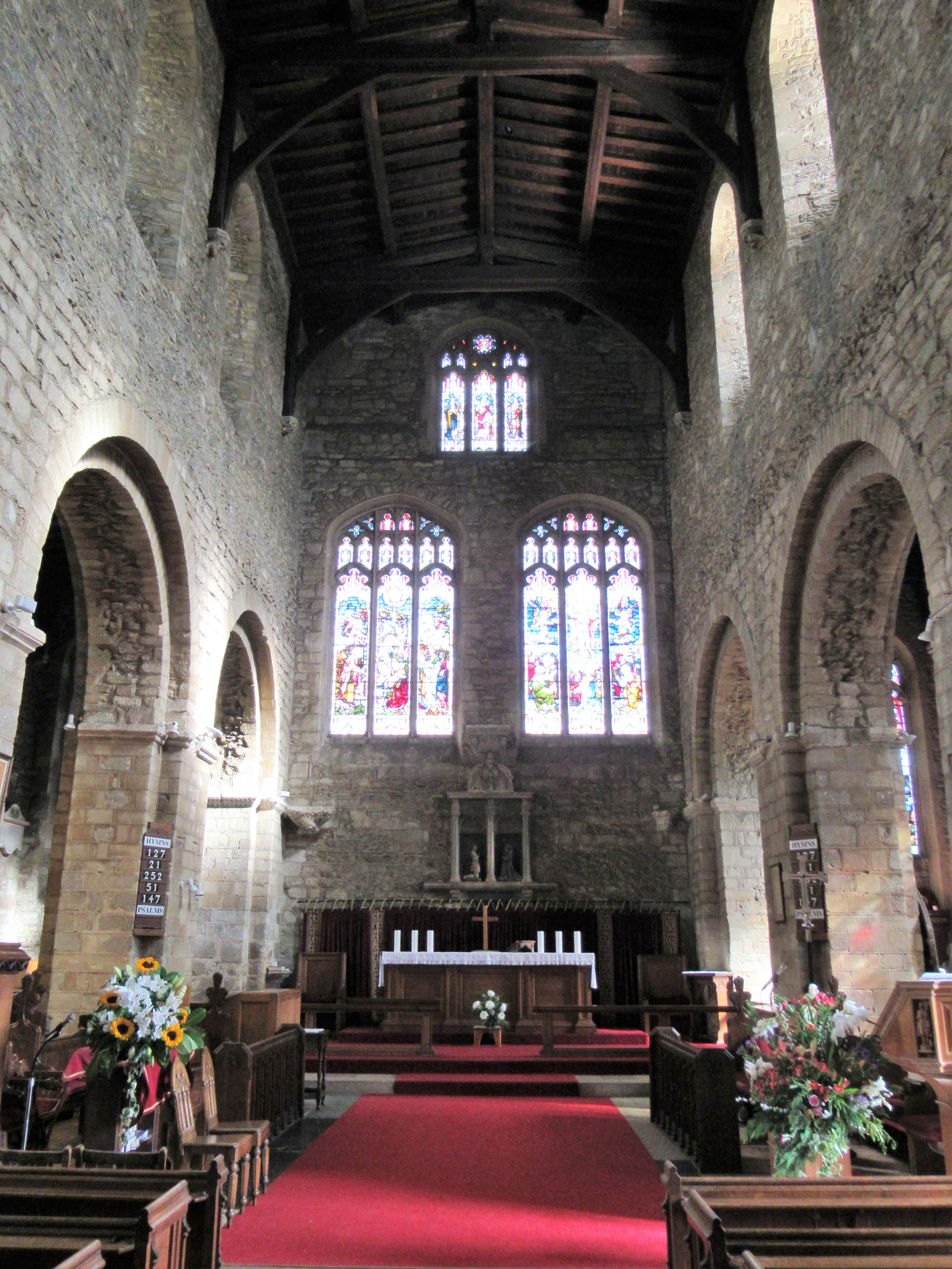
Radcliffe monument at Elstow

He was a son of Robert Radcliffe, 1st Earl of Sussex and Elizabeth, a daughter of Henry Stafford, 2nd Duke of Buckingham.

Radcliffe was a Member of Parliament for Bedfordshire and for Maldon in 1558 jointly with Roger Appleton.

Radcliffe, as Lieutenant of the Gentlemen Pensioners, is said to have spoken in favour of the Protestant writer Edward Underhill shortly before the wedding of Mary I of England and Philip II of Spain, and so Underhill was allowed to serve at the feast at Wolvesey Castle.

Radcliffe obtained the manor of Elstow in Bedfordshire, a former convent, from his wife's family, it had been granted to her father at the dissolution of the monasteries. He died on 30 August 1566. There is a monument at Elstow, set over the altar.

== Marriage and children ==
Humphrey Radcliffe married Isabel or Elizabeth Harvey (died 1594), daughter and heir of Edmund Harvey of Elstow. There is a somewhat fictionalised 19th-century account of their meeting at a tournament. Their children included:

- Thomas Radcliffe (died 1586)
- Edward Radcliffe (died 1643), who became Earl of Sussex in 1629.
- Mary Radcliffe (died 1617), a lady of the Privy Chamber of Elizabeth I and keeper of her jewels. Humphrey Radcliffe "presented" her to Elizabeth on 1 January 1561 as if she were a New Year's Day gift.
- Elizabeth Radcliffe, who married Henry Owen of Wotton, Surrey, a descendent of Owen Tudor.
- Martha Radcliffe, who married William Gostwick of Willington.
- Frances Radcliffe, who married Henry Cheke (died 1586), Secretary to the Council of the North.
