= Leonard Bilson (1616–1695) =

English Member of Parliament (1616-1695)

Leonard Bilson (1616–1695) was M.P. for Petersfield during the late 17th century.

Bilson was born on 5 December 1616, the third (second surviving) son of Sir Thomas Bilson MP of West Mapledurham and his wife Susanna, daughter of Sir William Uvedale MP. He was educated at University College, Oxford, graduating B.A. on 5 February 1635, and M.A. on 31 October 1637. His son Thomas succeeded him as MP.

Parliament of Great Britain
Preceded by Arthur Bold	Member of Parliament for Petersfield; 1667–1681; With: Thomas Neale; John Norton	Succeeded by Thomas Bilson
