= Richard Markes =

English Member of Parliament (1671–1704)

Richard Markes (1671–1704) was a M.P. for Petersfield.

He was born in Portsmouth, the only son of Richard and Anne Markes. In 1693 he married Mary Randall of Petersfield: they had 3 sons and 2 daughters. He was Clerk of the Rope Yard in Portsmouth Dockyard from 1691; and a Freeman of Portsmouth from 1702.

Parliament of Great Britain
| Preceded by Peter Bettesworth | Member of Parliament for Petersfield; 10 February 1701 – 1 January 1704; With: Ralph Bucknall; Robert Michell | Succeeded by Leonard Bilson |
