= Edward Radclyffe, 6th Earl of Sussex =

English politician

Edward Radclyffe

Member of Parliament for Bedfordshire
- In office 1588-1589; 1597-1611 Serving with Oliver St John (1588-1589); Nicholas Luke (1597–1598); Oliver St John (1601–1611)

Member of Parliament for Portsmouth
- In office 1593–1594 Serving with Thomas Thorney

Member of Parliament for Petersfield
- In office 1586-1587 Serving with Edmund Marvyn

Personal details
- Born: c. 1559
- Died: August 1643 (aged 83–84)
- Spouse(s): Elizabeth Petre Jane Hynde (m. 1594) Eleanor Wortley (m. 1634)
- Parent: Humphrey Radcliffe (father)
- Relatives: Thomas Radcliffe (brother); Mary Radcliffe (sister); Robert Radcliffe (grandfather); Elizabeth Stafford (grandmother); Robert Radclyffe (cousin)

Edward Radclyffe, 6th Earl of Sussex (c. 1559 – August 1643) was an English politician who sat in the House of Commons between 1586 and 1611 and later succeeded to a peerage.

== Biography ==
Radclyffe was the son of Sir Humphrey Radclyffe and his wife Isabel Harvey. He was the grandson of Robert Radcliffe, 1st Earl of Sussex and Elizabeth Stafford, Countess of Sussex.

In 1586, he was elected Member of Parliament for Petersfield. He was elected MP for Bedfordshire in 1588 and for Portsmouth in 1593. He was elected MP for Bedfordshire again in 1597, 1601 and 1604. He was appointed Sheriff of Bedfordshire in 1598.

Radclyffe was knighted around 1594 and inherited the earldom from his cousin Robert Radclyffe, 5th Earl of Sussex in 1629.

Radclyffe had married three times: first, Elizabeth Petre, the daughter of Sir William Petre of Ingatestone, Essex and widow of John Gostwick of Willington; secondly (1594) Jane, daughter of Francis Hynde of Madingley, Cambridgeshire and widow of John Catesby of Newnham in Goldington; and thirdly (1634) Eleanor, the daughter of Sir Richard Wortley of Wortley, Yorkshire and the widow of Sir Henry Lee, 1st Baronet of Quarendon, Buckinghamshire. Eleanor outlived him by many years and made two further marriages. He died impoverished and intestate. The earldom became extinct.

Parliament of England
Preceded by Sir Henry Weston; Edmund Marvyn	Member of Parliament for Petersfield; 1586–1587; With: Edmund Marvyn	Succeeded by Sir Benjamin Tichborne; Edmund Marvyn
Preceded by Thomas Snagge; George Rotheram	Member of Parliament for Bedfordshire; 1588–1589; With: Oliver St John	Succeeded by George Rotheram; Oliver St John
Preceded by Thomas Harris; Thomas Thorney	Member of Parliament for Portsmouth; 1593–1594; With: Thomas Thorney	Succeeded by William Greene; Thomas Thorney
Preceded by George Rotheram; Oliver St John	Member of Parliament for Bedfordshire; 1597–1611; With: Nicholas Luke 1597–1598; Oliver St John 1601–1611	Succeeded by Sir Henry Grey; Sir Oliver Luke
Political offices
Preceded by Thomas Cheyney	High Sheriff of Bedfordshire; 1598–1599	Succeeded by William Butler
Peerage of England
Preceded by Robert Radclyffe	Earl of Sussex; 1629–1643	Extinct
