= Samuel Pargiter-Fuller =

Samuel Pargiter-Fuller (1690–1722) was a M.P. for Petersfield.

A Whig, he was the eldest son of Samuel Pargiter, a merchant of St. Andrew, Holborn and Consul at Nice; and his wife, Frances. In 1713 he married Margaret, daughter and heir of Douse Fuller of Stedham and assumed the additional name of Fuller.

Parliament of Great Britain
Preceded by Leonard Bilson	Member of Parliament for Petersfield; 13 January 1704 – 28 June 1715; With: Norton Powlett	Succeeded by Edmund Miller
