= Sir Gregory Norton, 1st Baronet =

English politician

Sir Gregory Norton, 1st Baronet (1603 – 26 March 1652) was an English politician who sat in the House of Commons from 1645 to 1652. He supported the Parliamentary cause in the English Civil War and was one of the regicides of King Charles I.

Norton was the eldest surviving son of Henry Norton of Wantage in Berkshire, and probably grew up in Ireland where his father held an administrative post. He acquired an estate in Sussex upon his marriage to Martha Gunter around 1621, and was made a baronet in 1624. During the 1630s, Norton held a position as a minor official at the court of King Charles I.

Like his friend and fellow courtier Humphrey Edwards, Norton supported Parliament on the outbreak of the First Civil War. He became active in local administration in Sussex and the Isle of Wight, and was elected as recruiter Member of Parliament for Midhurst in Sussex in October 1645. Norton emerged as a radical Independent, with a particular interest in Irish affairs. He was active in the legal proceedings against King Charles in 1649, sitting as a member of the High Court of Justice and signing the King's death warrant.

During the Commonwealth, Norton was associated with the republican Henry Marten, but he also came under suspicion of profiteering from the sale of confiscated Royalist estates and properties. He died in 1652.

Norton disinherited his son Henry because he opposed the trial and execution of the King. Henry however inherited the baronetcy on the death of his father.

Parliament of England
| Preceded by William Cawley; Thomas May | Member of Parliament for Midhurst; 1645–1652; With: William Cawley | Succeeded by William Cawley |
Baronetage of England
| New creation | Baronet (of Charlton); 1624–1652 | Succeeded by Henry Norton |
