= Thomas Radcliffe (MP for Portsmouth) =

English politician

Member of Parliament for Portsmouth
- In office 1584

Personal details
- Died: 1586
- Parent: Humphrey Radcliffe (father)
- Relatives: Edward Radclyffe (brother)

Thomas Radcliffe (died 1586), of Elstow, Bedfordshire, was an English Member of Parliament (MP).

He was a Member of the Parliament of England for Portsmouth in 1584. He was the son of Humphrey Radcliffe and brother of Edward Radclyffe, 6th Earl of Sussex, both also MPs.
