= Julian Roberts =

British librarian, bibliographer, and scholar

Richard Julian Roberts
- Born: 18 May 1930
- Died: 20 October 2010 (aged 80)

Academic background
- Education: Magdalen College, Oxford

Academic work
- Discipline: Bibliography
- Institutions: British Museum; Bodleian Library

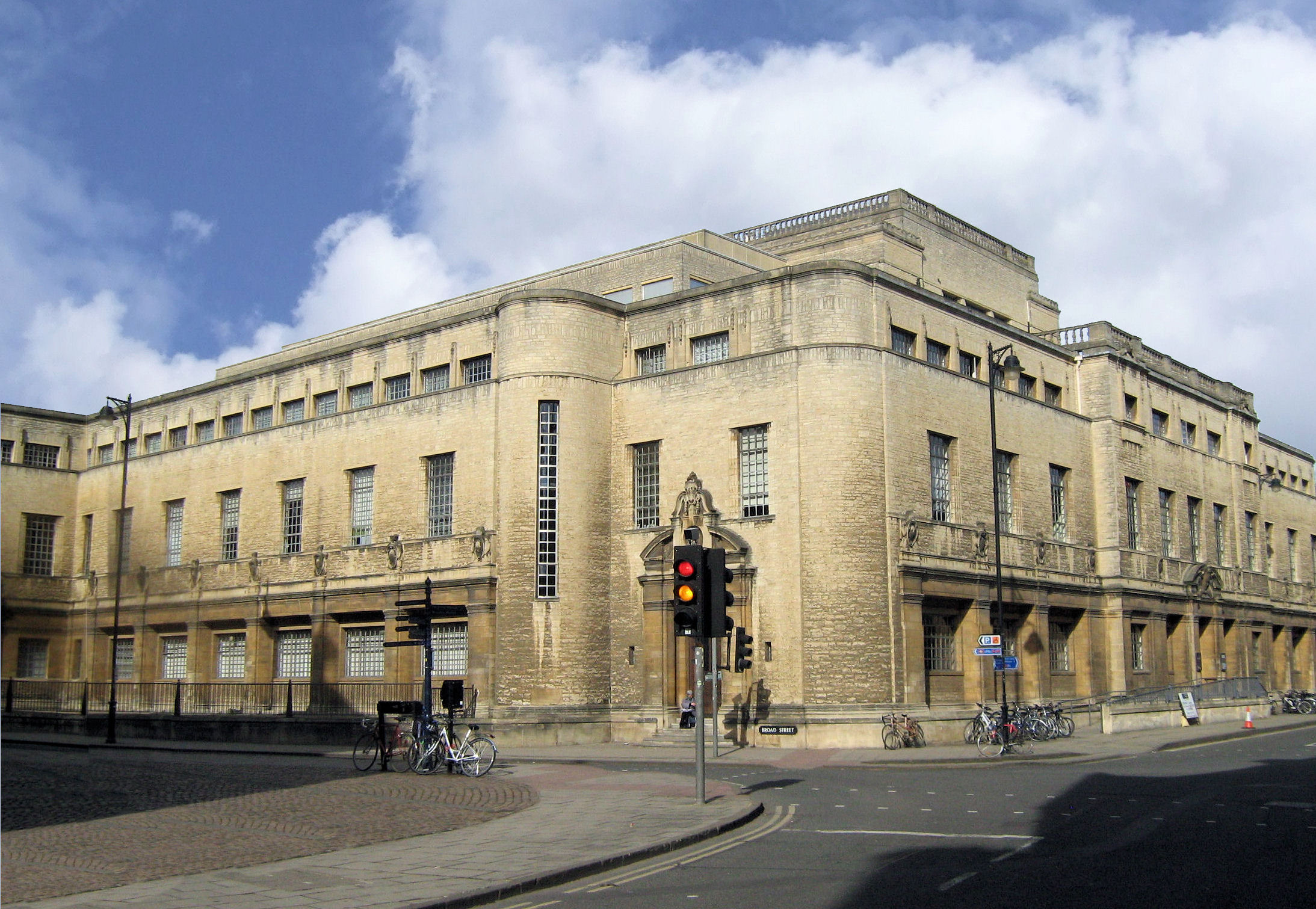
The New Bodleian Library building in Oxford, Julian Roberts' final workplace.

Richard Julian Roberts FSA (18 May 1930 – 20 October 2010) was a British librarian, bibliographer, and scholar.

Roberts was educated at King Edward's School, Birmingham, and Magdalen College, Oxford, where he started reading Classics, but switched to English in his first year.

== Biography ==
In the early 1950s, Roberts began his career at Lambeth Palace Library in London. In 1958, he was appointed as an Assistant Keeper at the British Museum, where the collections which were later to form the British Library were then located. In 1961, he became joint secretary of the Bibliographical Society with Sir Frank Francis, a post he held for 20 years.

In 1974, Roberts returned to Oxford to become Keeper of Printed Books in the Bodleian Library of the University of Oxford. He was elected a Fellow of Wolfson College in association with his post, and became the college's Vice-gerent (deputy head of the college) during 1983–84. At the Bodleian Library, Roberts oversaw the introduction of computerised cataloguing and the acquisition of important collections such as the Dunston Collection in 1981, the Marlborough Vicar's Library in 1985, and the Opie Collection of Children's Literature in 1988. In 1983, he was elected a Fellow of the Society of Antiquaries in London. On the premature death of John Jolliffe (Bodley's Librarian) in 1985, he became Acting Librarian and then Deputy Librarian, a post that he held until his retirement in 1997.

Jointly with Andrew Watson in the early 1970s, Roberts edited John Dee's Library Catalogue. John Dee (1527–1608/9) was a consultant to Queen Elizabeth I who devoted much of his life to the study of alchemy and divination. They published a new edition in 1990 and continued to provide amendments and corrections. Roberts also contributed to the planning of the New Cambridge Bibliography of English Literature, with his colleague Ian Willison. He provided much of the poetry section.

Roberts married Anne Duce and they had two children. While working at Oxford, he lived at the village of Tackley in Oxfordshire, north of Oxford.
