= George Tadlowe =

16th-century politician

George Tadlowe (by 1505 – 1557), of London, was an English politician.

Tadlowe was a Member of Parliament for Petersfield in 1547, Guildford in April 1554, Grampound in November 1554 and Camelford in 1555.

== See also ==
Parliament of England
