= Arthur Jolliffe =

British mathematician

Arthur Ernest Jolliffe (23 January 1871 – 17 March 1944) was a British mathematician.

== Life ==
Arthur Ernest Jolliffe was born at 39 Cardigan Street in the Jericho area of Oxford on 23 January 1871, the youngest son of Henry Jolliffe and Anne Speller. His father, who was a house painter, died just after Arthur's fifth birthday, and his mother went out to service: in 1881 when she was aged 50 she was working for a lady at 11 Warnborough Road in north Oxford, and Arthur lived with her there.

He was educated at the City of Oxford School and Balliol College, Oxford, gaining a First in Mathematics in 1891. He was a fellow of Corpus Christi College, Oxford, from 1891 to 1920, and was also an assistant tutor at Jesus College, Oxford, from 1903 to 1920. He was then appointed as Professor of Mathematics at the University of London, retiring in 1936. He was made an Honorary Fellow of Corpus Christi College in 1931 and of Jesus College in 1934. For many years he was an external examiner in mathematical physics for the National University of Ireland (NUI).

He was known more for the high quality of his teaching than for mathematical research. However, one of his papers, on uniform convergence of trigonometric series, remains well cited. He was also a contributor to the Encyclopædia Britannica.

On 1 July 1899 at St Paul's Church, Oxford he married Eliza Ostler of 14 Walton Crescent, the daughter of the tailor James Ostler, and they had three children.

Jolliffe died on 17 March 1944 in Oxford, and was buried in St Sepulchre's Cemetery, Walton Street.
