= John Cawley (priest) =

John Cawley (1632–1709) was an Anglican priest, who served as Archdeacon of Lincoln from 1667 until his death.

Cawley was the son of William Cawley the regicide and his first wife Catherine Walrond. He was born in Chichester and educated at Magdalen College, Oxford, graduating BA in 1652. He became a Fellow of All Souls College, Oxford and held livings at Bradwell-on-Sea, Henley-on-Thames and Didcot.

His career was not without controversy. In 1669 he was attacked for being unworthy of clerical office. In 1687 he was suspended for simony, but later reinstated after he petitioned the Crown personally.

His burial monument in Henley was designed by Francis Bird.

He was married: his children included John, Henry, Walrond, George, Maria, William, Elizabeth, Catherine, James. Julia, Anna, Francis and Susannah, who married the celebrated painter Sir Godfrey Kneller.
