= Sir John Norton, 3rd Baronet =

English politician

Sir John Norton, 3rd Baronet (1620 – 9 January 1687) was an English politician who sat in the House of Commons between 1661 and 1687. He supported the Royalist cause in the English Civil War.

Norton was the son of Sir Richard Norton, 1st Baronet and his wife Amy Bilson, daughter of Thomas Bilson, Bishop of Winchester. He matriculated at Corpus Christi College, Oxford on 23 June 1637, aged 17. He was admitted to Middle Temple in 1641. During the CIvil War, he and his father supported the King and suffered accordingly. He succeeded to the baronetcy on the death of his brother in 1652.

In 1661, Norton was elected Member of Parliament for Hampshire in the Cavalier Parliament. He was elected MP for Petersfield in 1679 and sat until his death.

Norton died at the age of 67 and was buried at East Tisted, when the Baronetcy became extinct.

Norton married Dorothy March, daughter of Thomas March of Ely before September 1670.

Parliament of England
Preceded by Richard Norton; John Bulkeley	Member of Parliament for Hampshire; 1661–1679; With: Lord St John 1661–1675; Sir Francis Rolle 1675–1679	Succeeded by Edward Noel; Richard Norton
Preceded by Thomas Neale; Leonard Bilson	Member of Parliament for Petersfield; 1679–1687; With: Leonard Bilson 1679–1685; Thomas Bilson	Succeeded by Robert Michell; Thomas Bilson
Baronetage of England
Preceded by Richard Norton	Baronet (of Rotherfield); 1652–1687	Extinct
