= Robert Michell (MP for Petersfield) =

English politician

Robert Michell (10 April 1653 – 1 August 1729) was an English politician who was a Member of Parliament for Petersfield during the late 17th and early 18th centuries.

== Biography ==
Michell was born at Warnham, the son of Edwin Michell and Mary née Middleton.

On 12 August 1675 he married Margaret White: they had two sons. Mary died in May 1679; and he later married Jane Bold, daughter of Arthur Bold, MP.

His third wife was Theodosia Montagu, daughter of George Montagu, MP: they had one daughter.

Parliament of Great Britain
Preceded by John Norton	Member of Parliament for Petersfield; 1689–1698; With: Sir Thomas Bilson; Richard Holt; Peter Bettesworth	Succeeded by Ralph Bucknall
Preceded by Ralph Bucknall	Member of Parliament for Petersfield; 1701–1702; With: Richard Markes; Leonard Bilson	Succeeded by Norton Powlett
