= Great Porthamel Farm and Gatehouse =

Mediaeval farm and gatehouse in Talgarth, Powys, Wales

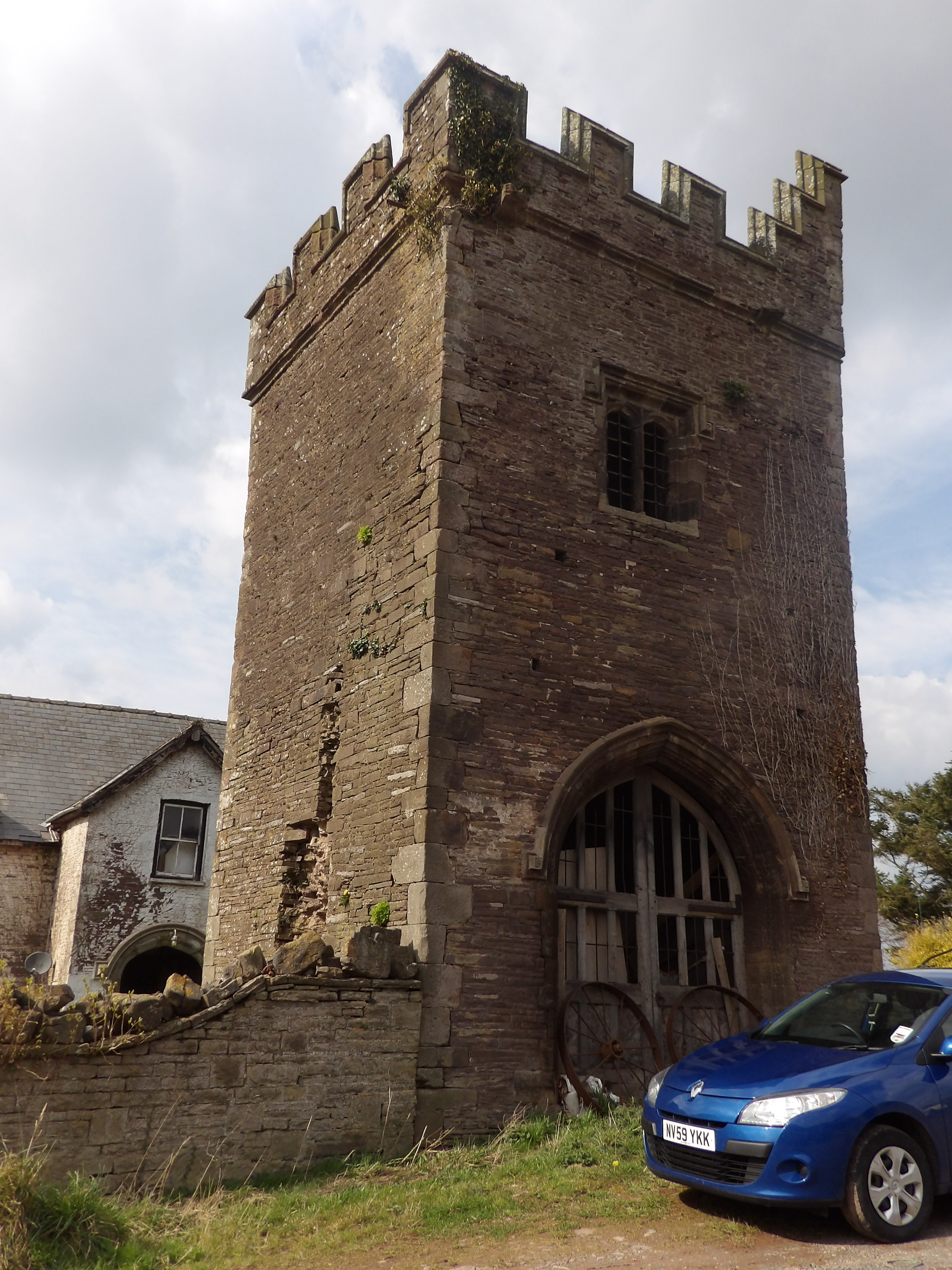
- The gatehouse to the fore with the farmhouse behind

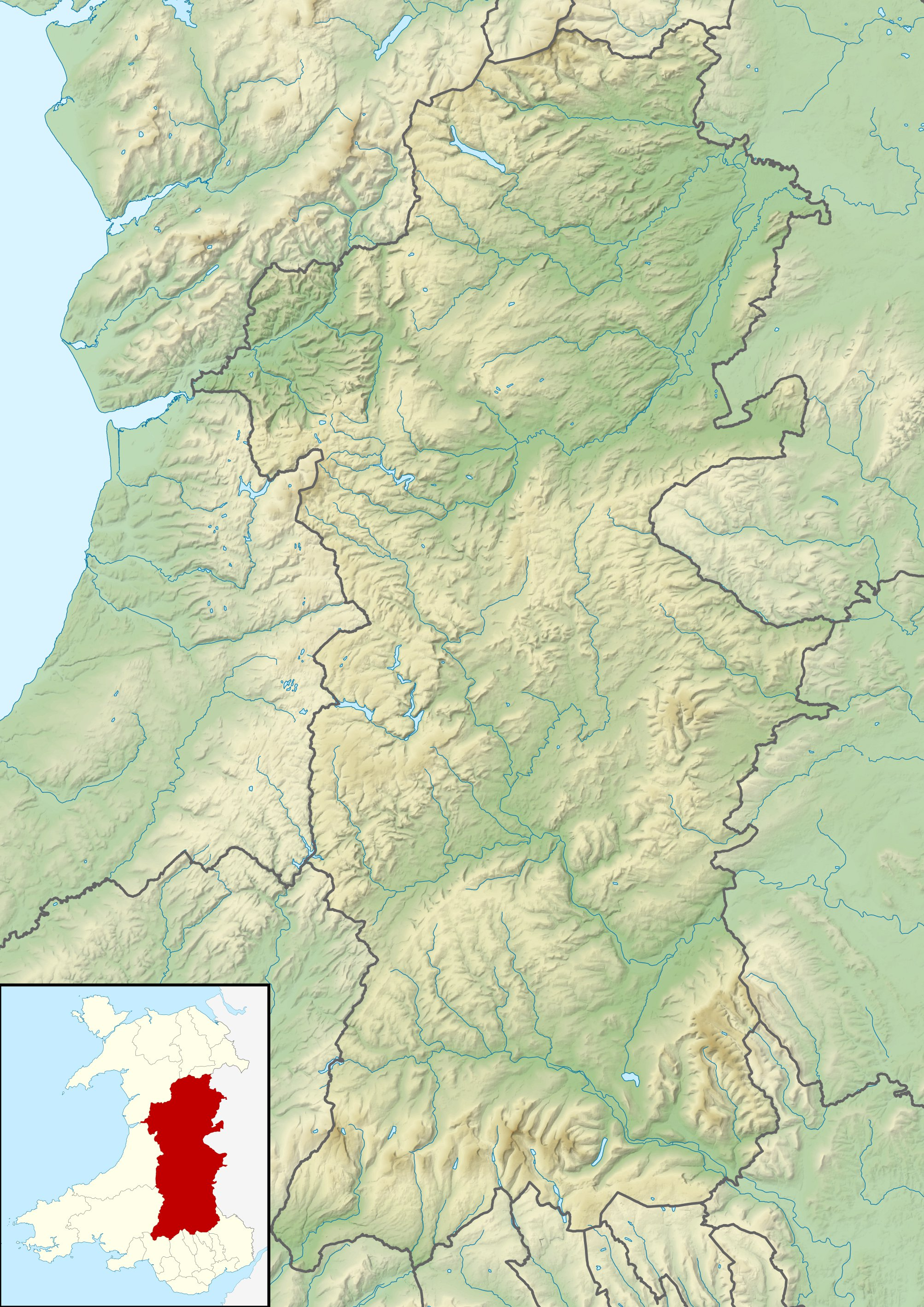
- Location within Powys
- 52.0088°N 3.2259°W
- Type: Gatehouse and farmhouse
- Location: Talgarth, Powys

History
- Built: late 15th century

Site notes
- Architectural style: Vernacular
- Governing body: Privately owned

Listed Building – Grade I
- Official name: Gatehouse at Porthamel Farmhouse
- Designated: 28 September 1961
- Reference no.: 6641

Scheduled monument
- Official name: Porthamel Tower
- Reference no.: BR047

Listed Building – Grade II*
- Official name: Great Porthamel Farmhouse
- Designated: 28 February 1952
- Reference no.: 6652

Listed Building – Grade II
- Official name: Farm building at Porthamel Farm
- Designated: 14 August 1995
- Reference no.: 16303

The farm at Great Porthamel, at Talgarth in Powys, Wales, comprises a range of buildings including the farmhouse, the gate tower and an agricultural building. They form the remnants of a major medieval manor that was the principal seat of the Vaughan family. The complex has been described as "one of the more remarkable mediaeval houses of Wales". The gatehouse is a Grade I listed building, and a scheduled monument, while the farmhouse is listed at Grade II* and the agricultural building at Grade II.

== History ==
The estate at Great Porthamel (Note: There are many variants including Porthamal and Porth-Amel.) was established by Sir William Vaughan, created the first High Sheriff of Brecknockshire in 1539. (Note: The Vaughans were an ancient family who claimed descent from the Princes of Powys.) The Porthamel Vaughans, a junior branch of the Vaughans of Tretower Court, came to prominence and wealth as minor personages at the Tudor courts of Henry VII and Henry VIII. Rowland Lee, Lord President of the Marches, wrote to Thomas Cromwell that William Vaughan was “a man to be cherished”. Sir William began building at the end of the 15th, or the early 16th centuries, and a contemporary account records the gatehouse forming the entrance to a "a strong wall-embatteled" enclosure. Cadw's Coflein record gives a date for construction of 1536. The farmhouse also dates from this time, although reconstruction took place in the later Tudor era, including the addition of a two-storey porch.

Robert Scourfield and Richard Haslam, in their 2013 volume, Powys, of the Buildings of Wales series, note that much of the Porthamel enclosure had been destroyed by the 19th century.

The farm at Porthamel is the site of an anaerobic digester, following a controversial, but successful, planning application in the early 21st century, which saw the development opposed by the Brecon Beacons National Park authority.

== Architecture and description ==
The Porthamel complex has been described as "one of the more remarkable mediaeval houses of Wales". The farmhouse is of two storeys and five bays. The tower is approximately 8m in height. It has an upper chamber with stairs leading to a castellated look-out point. It is a Grade I listed building and a Scheduled monument. The farmhouse is listed at Grade II*, while the agricultural building is Grade II.

== Gallery ==
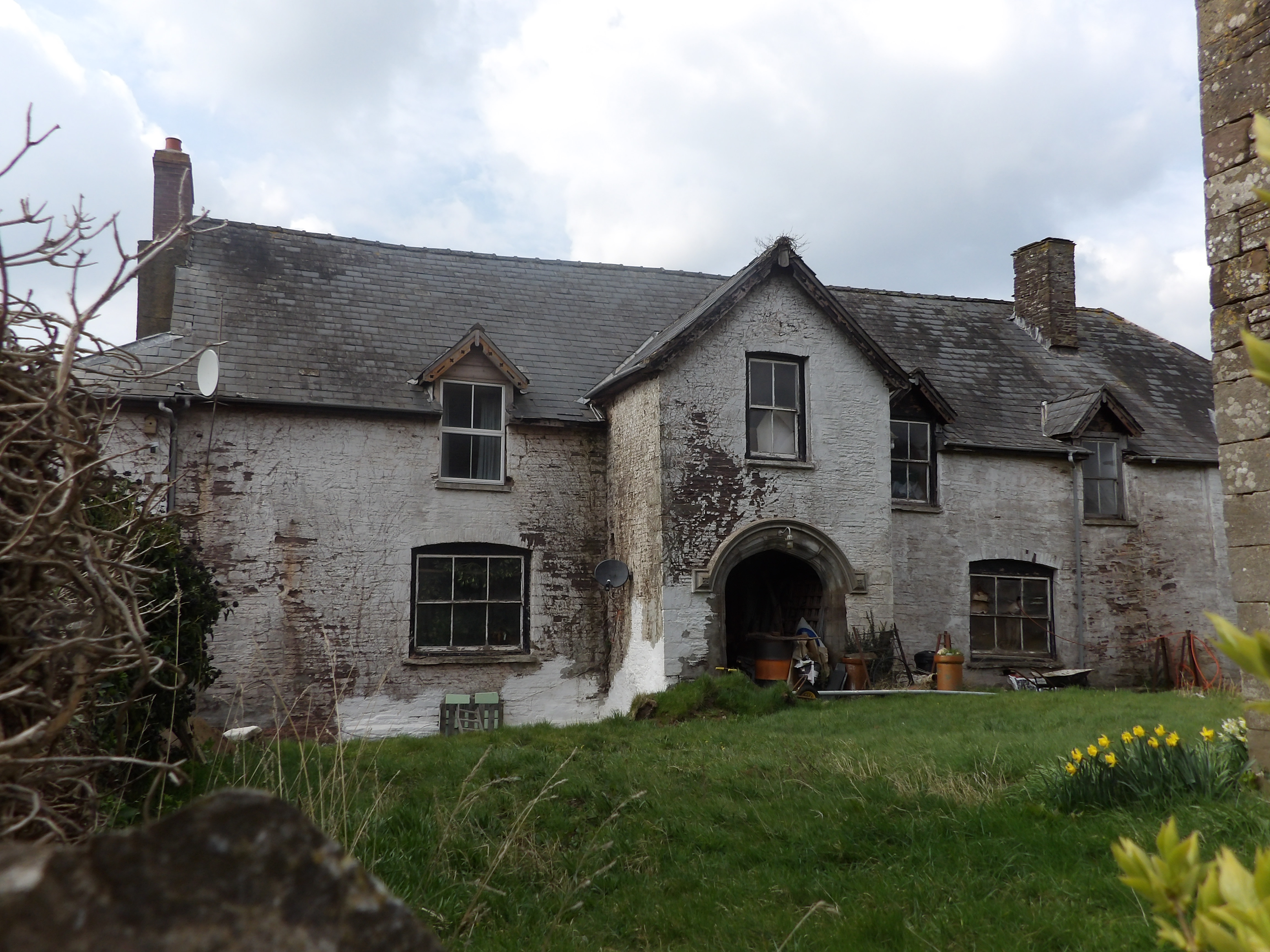
The farmhouse

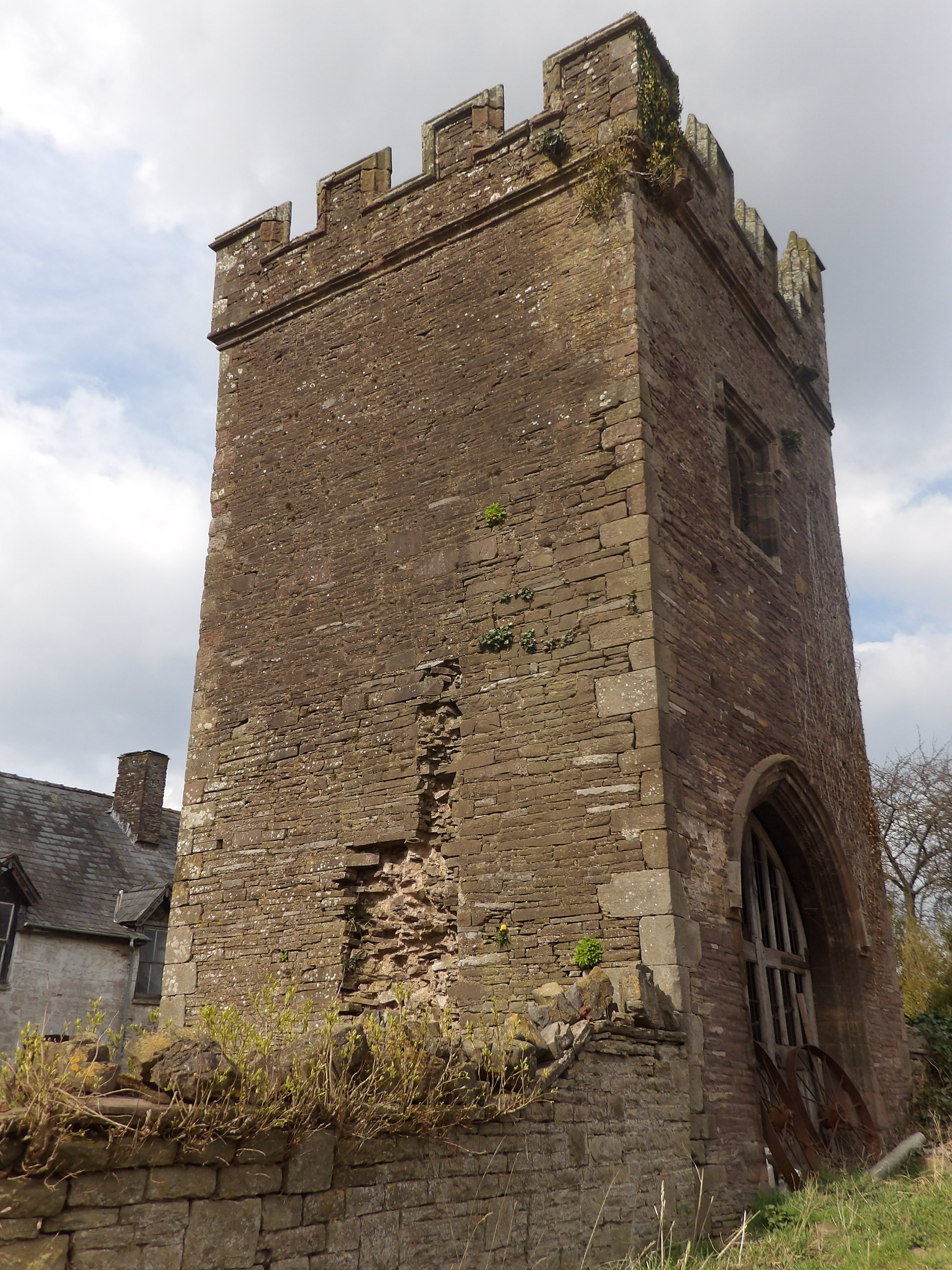
Another view of the tower

== Sources ==
- Scourfield, Robert; Haslam, Richard (2013). Powys: Montgomeryshire, Radnorshire and Breconshire. The Buildings of Wales. New Haven, US and London: Yale University Press. ISBN 978-0-300-18508-9. OCLC 935421607.
