= Sir Richard Norton, 1st Baronet =

English politician

Sir Richard Norton, 1st Baronet (c. 1582 – June 1646) was an English politician who sat in the House of Commons from 1621 to 1622. He supported the Royalist cause in the English Civil War.

In March 1608, Norton was set to join an embassy to Florence with the diplomat Stephen Lesieur. He was challenged to a duel by Henry Clare (a follower of the Earl of Montgomery) for wrongs done to his sister. Lesieur wrote to the Earl of Salisbury to prevent a fight. Trouble was avoided and Norton joined the embassy.

Norton was the son of Sir Richard Norton, of East Tisted, Hampshire and his wife Mabel Beecher, daughter of Henry Becher, Alderman of London. He matriculated at Queen's College, Oxford on 14 October 1597, aged 15. In 1602, he entered Middle Temple. He was knighted at Hampton Court on 10 January 1611. He was High Sheriff of Hampshire from 1613 to 1614. In 1621, he was elected Member of Parliament for Petersfield. He was created baronet on 18 May 1622.

During the Civil War, Norton suffered in the royal cause. He was imprisoned in July 1644, and received a fine of £1,000 which was later reduced to £500.

Norton died before 27 August 1645. He had married Amy Bilson, daughter of Thomas Bilson, Bishop of Winchester from 1597 to 1616. He was succeeded in the baronetcy successively by his sons Richard and John.

Parliament of England
Preceded by Sir Walter Tichborne; Walter Savage	Member of Parliament for Petersfield; 1621–1622; With: John Hippisley	Succeeded by Sir John Jephson; Sir John Hippisley
Baronetage of England
New creation	Baronet (of Rotherfield); 1622–1646	Succeeded by Richard Norton
