= John Jolliffe (of Petersfield) =

English politician

John Jolliffe (bapt. 31 July 1696 – 31 January 1771) was an English politician. He established his family's political control of the pocket borough of Petersfield in Hampshire, and sat for the town in the House of Commons for a total of 30 years.

== Early life and family ==
Jolliffe was the third son of Benjamin Jolliffe of Cofton Hall, Worcestershire. His mother, Mary, was a daughter of the London merchant John Jolliffe, and a sister of Sir William Jolliffe.

He was educated at Westminster School and at University College, Oxford then at the Middle Temple and the Inner Temple. In March 1731 he married Catherine Michell, daughter and heir of Robert Michell, a Member of Parliament (MP) for Petersfield. Catherine died in June 1731, and in 1744 Jolliffe married Mary, daughter and co-heir of Samuel Holden (a former MP for East Looe). They had three sons and one daughter:

- William (1745–1802), MP for Petersfield 1768–1802
- Thomas Samuel (1746–1824), MP for Petersfield 1780–1787
- Charles, who joined the British Army and was killed at the Battle of Waterloo
- Mary Anne

== Career ==
From Catherine he inherited land in the town of Petersfield in Hampshire, which brought control of one of the borough's two parliamentary seats. He used that to return his uncle Sir William Jolliffe as MP in 1734, and then bought the manor of Petersfield from Edward Gibbon, which gave him control of the second seat.

He sat as MP for Petersfield from 1741 to 1754, and again from 1761 to 1768. From 1738 to 1751 he was Receiver-General of the Duchy of Lancaster.

In 1771 he donated a house and garden to be used as a poor house in Petersfield.

Parliament of Great Britain
Preceded by Sir William Jolliffe; Edward Gibbon	Member of Parliament for Petersfield; 1741–1754; With: Francis Fane 1741–1747; William Conolly 1747–1754; William Gerard Hamilton 1754	Succeeded by William Gerard Hamilton; William Beckford
Preceded by William Gerard Hamilton; Sir John Philipps, Bt	Member of Parliament for Petersfield; 1761–1768; With: Richard Pennant 1761–67; Richard Croftes 1767–68	Succeeded by Welbore Ellis; William Jolliffe
