= Richard Weston (MP for Petersfield) =

Member of the Parliament of England

Richard Weston (1564-1613) was MP for Petersfield in the 1593 parliament.

== Life ==
Weston was the son of Henry Weston (politician) by his first wife Dorothy, daughter of Thomas Arundell of Wardour Castle. He inherited the borough of Petersfield from his father in 1592 and returned himself as its MP the following year. In 1597 he sold the borough to Thomas Hanbury.

He was at Cadiz with the Earl of Essex in 1596, from whom he received a knighthood and was probably the commander of The Swan on the voyage. Following the accession of James VI and I he was appointed keeper of the red deer in Windsor Great Park. By that time he was already in debt and by 1609 he was in prison for debt. He died intestate four years later.

== Family ==
He married Jane, daughter and heir of John Dister of West Bergholt, Essex around 1583. His son and heir Richard was the author of The compleat husband-man: or, A discourse of the whole art of husbandry published by Samuel Hartlib.

Parliament of Great Britain
Preceded by Edmund Marvyn	Member of Parliament for Petersfield; 1593–1597; With: Walter Covert	Succeeded by Thomas Hanbury
