= Henry Jolliffe =

English cricketer

Personal information
- Full name: John Henry Jolliffe
- Born: 28 September 1865; Ventnor, Isle of Wight, England
- Died: 5 July 1936 (aged 70); Whippingham, Isle of Wight, England

Domestic team information
- Years: Team
- 1902: Hampshire

Career statistics
Competition	First-class
Matches	1
Runs scored	1
Batting average	0.50
100s/50s	0/0
Top score	1
Catches/stumpings	1/–
- Source: Cricinfo, 9 January 2010

John Henry Jolliffe (28 September 1865 — 5 July 1936) was an English first-class cricketer.

Jolliffe was born on the Isle of Wight at Ventnor in September 1865. He made a single appearance in first-class cricket for Hampshire against Derbyshire at Southampton in the 1902 County Championship. Batting twice in the match from the middle order, he was dismissed bowled for a single run in Hampshire's first innings by John Hulme, while in their second innings he was dismissed leg before wicket by Hulme without scoring. Jolliffe died on the Isle of Wight at Whippingham in July 1936.
