= John Jolliffe (merchant) =

English merchant and politician

John Jolliffe (29 August 1613 – 2 January 1680) was an English merchant and politician who sat in the House of Commons from 1660 to 1679.

Jolliffe was a merchant of the City of London and a member of the Worshipful Company of Skinners. He was one of the court assistants from 1650 to 59 and a member of the committee of the East India Company for 1657 and 1658. He was elected alderman for Bishopsgate ward on 23 September 1658. He was treasurer of the Levant Company from 1659 to 1661.

In 1660, Jolliffe was elected Member of Parliament for Heytesbury in the Convention Parliament. In 1660, he was again a member of the committee of the East India Company and retained the position until his death. He was Master of the Skinners Company in 1661 and was one of the court assistants from 1661 to 1662. He was re-elected MP for Heytesbury in 1661 for the Cavalier Parliament and sat until 1679. He was Auditor from 1662 to 1664 and Deputy-Governor of the Levant Company from 1662 to 1671. In 1665, he became Deputy-Governor of the East India Company until 1667. He was one of the court assistants from 1671 to 1672 and became Governor of the Levant Company in 1672 until 1673. In 1673, he was Governor of the Russia Company and remained one of the court assistants from 1673 until 1678.

Jolliffe died at the age of 66.

Jolliffe married a daughter of Walter Boothby (Alderman in 1652). His son William was MP for Petersfield from 1734 to 1741. One of his daughters married Sir Samuel Moyer, 1st Baronet, and Anne married Sir Edward Northey (Attorney-General to Queen Anne). Another daughter, Mary, married Benjamin Jolliffe of Cofton Hall, Worcestershire. Her son John Jolliffe (1697–1771) was the first of several generations of Jolliffes to control the parliamentary borough of Petersfield.
