= Edmund Marvyn =

Member of the Parliament of England

Edmund Marvyn was MP for Petersfield from 1584 to 1593.

Parliament of Great Britain
Preceded by Thomas Chatterton	Member of Parliament for Petersfield; 1584–1593; With: Henry Weston (politician); Edward Radclyffe; Benjamin Tichborne	Succeeded by Richard Weston
