= John Vaughan (died 1577) =

English politician

John Vaughan (by 1512 – 25 June 1577) was an English politician.

Vaughan was a Member of the Parliament of England for Herefordshire in 1542, Horsham in 1547, Surrey in 1547, Petersfield in March 1553, April 1554 and November 1554, Bletchingley in 1555, Hedon in 1559, Northumberland in 1563, Dartmouth in 1571 and Grantham in 1572.

== Family ==
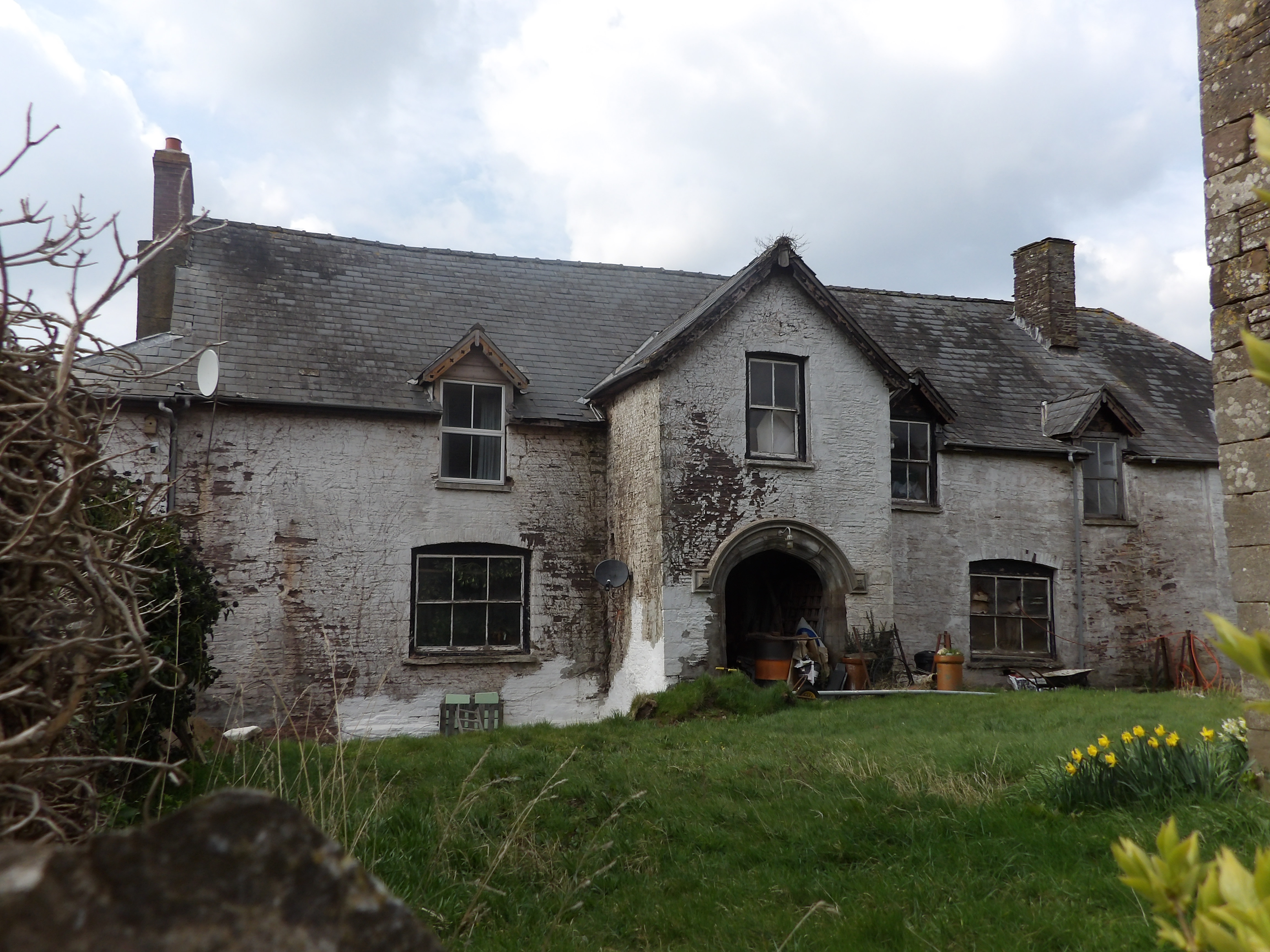
Porthamel

Vaughan was a younger son of Thomas Vaughan of Porthaml in Breconshire and Elizabeth, daughter of Henry Miles alias Parry of Bacton, Herefordshire. He was a nephew of the courtier Blanche Parry. Some elements of the 16th-century manor house survive at Great Porthamel Farm.

He married Anne Pickering, widow of Sir Francis Weston and Sir Henry Knyvet. Their children included:

- Francis Vaughan.
- Frances Vaughan, a maid of honour at the court of Elizabeth I in 1578 when her clothes were made by the Queen's tailor Walter Fyshe. She married Thomas Burgh, 3rd Baron Burgh and was the chief mourner at Blanche Parry's funeral in 1590. Blanche Parry was godmother to her daughters Frances and Elizabeth Burgh. As a widow, in November 1613, she was given an allowance of £500 and went to join the household of Elizabeth Stuart, Queen of Bohemia at Heidelberg.
