= Petersfield (constituency) =

Former English Parliamentary constituency

- Former borough constituency for the House of Commons
- Petersfield in Hampshire, showing boundaries used from 1974–1983

1547–1983
- Seats: 1547–1832: two 1832–1983: one
- Created from: Hampshire
- Replaced by: East Hampshire, Winchester and Fareham

Petersfield was an English Parliamentary constituency centred on the town of Petersfield in Hampshire. It existed for several hundred years until its abolition for the 1983 general election.

Until 1832, it returned two Members of Parliament to the House of Commons of the Parliament of the United Kingdom. Thereafter, its representation was reduced to one member until its abolition in 1983.

== Boundaries ==
1885–1918: The Sessional Divisions of Alton, Droxford, and Petersfield, and part of the Sessional Division of Winchester.

1918–1950: The Urban Districts of Alton and Petersfield, and the Rural Districts of Alresford, Alton, Catherington, Droxford, and Petersfield.

1950–1955: The Urban Districts of Alton and Petersfield, the Rural Districts of Alton, Droxford, and Petersfield, and in the Rural District of Winchester the parishes of Botley, Burlesdon, Hamble, Hedge End, Hound, and West End.

1955–1983: The Urban Districts of Alton and Petersfield, and the Rural Districts of Alton, Droxford, and Petersfield.

== Members of Parliament ==
=== MPs for Petersfield borough (1547–1885) ===
==== MPs 1547–1660 ====
| Parliament | First member | Second member |
|---|---|---|
| 1547 | George Tadlowe | Lawrence Elveden alias Cattaneo |
| 1553 (Mar) | Sir Anthony Browne | John Vaughan |
| 1553 (Oct) | Sir Anthony Browne | George Rithe |
| 1554 (Apr) | John Vaughan | Henry Weston |
| 1554 (Nov) | John Vaughan | Henry Weston |
| 1555 | Christopher Rithe | Henry Weston |
| 1558 | Henry Weston | Christopher Rithe |
| 1559 | Sir Henry Weston | George Rithe |
| 1563 | Sir Henry Weston | Tomas Dering |
| 1571 | John Cowper | Robert Rithe |
| 1572 | Richard Norton | Ralph Bourchier, sat for Newcastle-under-Lyme and repl. Apr 1572 by Thomas Chatterton |
| 1584 | Sir Henry Weston | Edmund Marvyn |
| 1586 | Edward Radclyffe | Edmund Marvyn |
| 1588 | Benjamin Tichborne | Edmund Marvyn |
| 1593 | Sir Walter Covert | Richard Weston (MP for Petersfield) |
| 1597 | William Kingswell | Thomas Hanbury |
| 1601 | William Kingswell | John Swynnerton |
| 1604 | Sir William Hervey | Sir William Kingswell |
| 1614 | Sir Walter Tichborne | Walter Savage |
| 1621-1622 | Richard Norton | John Hippisley |
| 1624 | Sir John Jephson | Sir John Hippisley |
| 1625 | Sir John Jephson | William Uvedale |
| 1626 | Benjamin Tichborne | William Uvedale |
| 1628-1629 | Benjamin Tichborne | William Uvedale |
| 1629–1640 | No Parliaments summoned | |
| 1640 (Apr) | William Uvedale | Sir William Lewis |
| 1640 (Nov) | William Uvedale, disabled | Sir William Lewis |
| 1645 | Sir William Lewis,excluded 1648 | William Uvedale |
| 1653 | Petersfield not represented in Barebones Parliament | |
| 1654 | Petersfield not represented in 1st Protectorate Parliament | |
| 1656 | Petersfield not represented in 2nd Protectorate Parliament | |
| 1659 | Josias Child | Sir Henry Norton |

==== MPs 1660–1832 ====
| Year | First member | First party | Second member | Second party |
|---|---|---|---|---|
| April 1660 | Thomas Cole | | Arthur Bold | |
| 1661 | Sir Humphrey Bennet | | Arthur Bold | |
| 1668 | Thomas Neale | | Arthur Bold | |
| 1677 | Thomas Neale | | Leonard Bilson | |
| 1679 | Sir John Norton, Bt | | Leonard Bilson | |
| 1685 | Sir John Norton, Bt | | Thomas Bilson | |
| 1689 | Robert Michell | | Thomas Bilson | |
| 1690 | Robert Michell | | Richard Holt | |
| 1698 | Robert Michell | | Peter Bettesworth | |
| January 1701 | Ralph Bucknall | | Richard Markes | |
| November 1701 | Robert Michell | | Richard Markes | |
| 1704 | Robert Michell | | Leonard Bilson | |
| 1705 | Norton Powlett | Whig | Leonard Bilson | |
| 1715 | Norton Powlett | Whig | Samuel Pargiter-Fuller | |
| 1722 | Norton Powlett | Whig | Edmund Miller | |
| January 1727 | Norton Powlett | Whig | Joseph Taylor | Tory |
| May 1727 | Norton Powlett | Whig | Edmund Miller | |
| August 1727 | Norton Powlett | Whig | Joseph Taylor | Tory |
| 1734 | Sir William Jolliffe | | Edward Gibbon | |
| 1741 | John Jolliffe | | Francis Fane | |
| 1747 | John Jolliffe | | William Conolly | Whig |
| February 1754 | John Jolliffe | | William Gerard Hamilton | |
| April 1754 | William Beckford | | William Gerard Hamilton | |
| December 1754 | Sir John Philipps, Bt | | William Gerard Hamilton | |
| 1761 | John Jolliffe | | Richard Pennant | |
| 1767 | John Jolliffe | | Richard Croftes | |
| 1768 | William Jolliffe | | Welbore Ellis | |
| 1774 | William Jolliffe | | Sir Abraham Hume | |
| 1780 | William Jolliffe | Tory | Thomas Samuel Jolliffe | Tory |
| 1787 | William Jolliffe | Tory | The Viscount Downe | |
| June 1790 | William Jolliffe | Tory | Hon. George North | Whig |
| December 1790 | William Jolliffe | Tory | Marquess of Titchfield | |
| 1791 | William Jolliffe | Tory | Welbore Ellis | |
| 1795 | William Jolliffe | Tory | Hon. Charles Greville | |
| 1796 | William Jolliffe | Tory | Hylton Jolliffe | |
| 1797 | William Jolliffe | Tory | Sir John Sinclair, Bt | |
| March 1802 | Hylton Jolliffe | | Sir John Sinclair, Bt | |
| July 1802 | Hylton Jolliffe | Tory | William Best | |
| 1806 | Hylton Jolliffe | Tory | Hon. John Ward | |
| 1807 | Hylton Jolliffe | Tory | Booth Grey | |
| October 1812 | Hylton Jolliffe | Tory | George Canning | Tory |
| December 1812 | Hylton Jolliffe | Tory | George Canning, junior | Tory |
| March 1820 | Hylton Jolliffe | Tory | The Lord Hotham | Tory |
| June 1820 | Hylton Jolliffe | Tory | Sir Philip Musgrave, Bt | Tory |
| 1825 | Hylton Jolliffe | Tory | James Lushington | Tory |
| 1826 | Hylton Jolliffe | Tory | William Marshall | Whig |
| 1830 | Sir William Jolliffe, Bt | Tory | Gilbert East Jolliffe | Tory |
| 1831 | Sir William Jolliffe, Bt | Tory | Hylton Jolliffe | Tory |
| 1832 | Representation reduced to one member | | | |

==== MPs 1832–1885 ====
| Election | Member | Party |
|---|---|---|
| 1832 | John Shaw-Lefevre | Whig |
| 1833 | Hylton Jolliffe | Tory |
| 1834 | Hylton Jolliffe | Conservative Party |
| 1835 | Cornthwaite Hector | Radical |
| 1837 | Sir William Jolliffe, Bt | Conservative Party |
| 1838 | Cornthwaite Hector | Radical |
| 1841 | Sir William Jolliffe | Conservative Party |
| 1866 by-election | William Nicholson | Liberal Party |
| 1874 | William Sydney Hylton Jolliffe | Conservative Party |
| 1880 | William Nicholson | Liberal Party |
| 1885 | Borough abolished - name transferred to county division | |

=== MPs for Petersfield county constituency (1885–1983) ===
| Election | Member | Party |
|---|---|---|
| 1885 | Viscount Wolmer | Liberal |
| 1886 | Viscount Wolmer | Liberal Unionist |
| 1892 | William Wickham | Conservative |
| 1897 | William Graham Nicholson | Conservative |
| 1935 | Sir Reginald Dorman-Smith | Conservative |
| 1941 | Sir George Jeffreys | Conservative |
| 1951 | Peter Legh | Conservative |
| 1960 | Joan Quennell | Conservative |
| 1974 | Michael Mates | Conservative |
| 1983 | Constituency abolished | |

== Elections ==
=== Elections in the 1830s ===
General election 1830: Petersfield
| Party | Candidate | Votes | % |
|---|---|---|---|
| Tory | William Jolliffe | 28 | 41.2 |
| Tory | Gilbert East Jolliffe | 28 | 41.2 |
| Nonpartisan | Henry Herbert | 6 | 8.8 |
| Nonpartisan | John Ogle | 6 | 8.8 |
| Majority | | 22 | 32.4 |
| Turnout | | c. 34 | |
| Tory hold | | | |
| Tory hold | | | |

- 201 householders voted for the Jolliffes and 148 for Herbert and Ogle, but these were all rejected

General election 1831: Petersfield
| Party | Candidate | Votes | % | ±% |
|---|---|---|---|---|
| Tory | William Jolliffe | 29 | 41.4 | +0.2 |
| Tory | Hylton Jolliffe | 29 | 41.4 | +0.2 |
| Nonpartisan | John Ogle | 6 | 8.6 | −0.2 |
| Nonpartisan | Charles Marsh | 6 | 8.6 | −0.2 |
| Majority | | 23 | 32.8 | +0.4 |
| Turnout | | c. 35 | | |
| Tory hold | | Swing | +0.2 | |
| Tory hold | | Swing | +0.2 | |

General election 1832: Petersfield
| Party | Candidate | Votes | % | ±% |
|---|---|---|---|---|
| Whig | John Shaw Lefevre | 101 | 50.2 | N/A |
| Tory | William Jolliffe | 100 | 49.8 | −33.0 |
| Majority | | 1 | 0.4 | N/A |
| Turnout | | 201 | 85.9 | |
| Registered electors | | 234 | | |
| Whig gain from Tory | | Swing | N/A | |

On petition, Shaw Lefevre was declared unelected, and Jolliffe was elected.

General election 1835: Petersfield
| Party | Candidate | Votes | % | ±% |
|---|---|---|---|---|
| Radical | Cornthwaite Hector | 103 | 54.2 | N/A |
| Conservative | William Jolliffe | 87 | 45.8 | −4.0 |
| Majority | | 16 | 8.4 | N/A |
| Turnout | | 190 | 66.2 | −19.7 |
| Registered electors | | 287 | | |
| Radical gain from Whig | | Swing | N/A | |

General election 1837: Petersfield
| Party | Candidate | Votes | % | ±% |
|---|---|---|---|---|
| Conservative | William Jolliffe | 125 | 50.2 | +4.4 |
| Radical | Cornthwaite Hector | 124 | 49.8 | −4.4 |
| Majority | | 1 | 0.4 | N/A |
| Turnout | | 249 | 77.8 | +11.6 |
| Registered electors | | 320 | | |
| Conservative gain from Radical | | Swing | +4.4 | |

On petition, Jolliffe was unseated and Hector declared elected.

=== Elections in the 1840s ===
General election 1841: Petersfield
| Party | Candidate | Votes | % | ±% |
|---|---|---|---|---|
| Conservative | William Jolliffe | Unopposed | | |
| Registered electors | | 352 | | |
| Conservative hold | | | | |

General election 1847: Petersfield
| Party | Candidate | Votes | % | ±% |
|---|---|---|---|---|
| Conservative | William Jolliffe | Unopposed | | |
| Registered electors | | 380 | | |
| Conservative hold | | | | |

=== Elections in the 1850s ===
General election 1852: Petersfield
| Party | Candidate | Votes | % | ±% |
|---|---|---|---|---|
| Conservative | William Jolliffe | Unopposed | | |
| Registered electors | | 353 | | |
| Conservative hold | | | | |

General election 1857: Petersfield
| Party | Candidate | Votes | % | ±% |
|---|---|---|---|---|
| Conservative | William Jolliffe | Unopposed | | |
| Registered electors | | 331 | | |
| Conservative hold | | | | |

General election 1859: Petersfield
| Party | Candidate | Votes | % | ±% |
|---|---|---|---|---|
| Conservative | William Jolliffe | Unopposed | | |
| Registered electors | | 332 | | |
| Conservative hold | | | | |

=== Elections in the 1860s ===
General election 1865: Petersfield
| Party | Candidate | Votes | % | ±% |
|---|---|---|---|---|
| Conservative | William Jolliffe | Unopposed | | |
| Registered electors | | 296 | | |
| Conservative hold | | | | |

Jolliffee was elevated to the peerage, becoming 1st Baron Hylton and causing a by-election.

By-election, 23 July 1866: Petersfield
| Party | Candidate | Votes | % | ±% |
|---|---|---|---|---|
| Liberal | William Nicholson | Unopposed | | |
| Liberal gain from Conservative | | | | |

General election 1868: Petersfield
| Party | Candidate | Votes | % | ±% |
|---|---|---|---|---|
| Liberal | William Nicholson | 370 | 62.5 | N/A |
| Conservative | Frederic Du Pré Thornton | 222 | 37.5 | N/A |
| Majority | | 148 | 25.0 | N/A |
| Turnout | | 592 | 76.5 | N/A |
| Registered electors | | 774 | | |
| Liberal gain from Conservative | | Swing | N/A | |

=== Elections in the 1870s ===
General election 1874: Petersfield
| Party | Candidate | Votes | % | ±% |
|---|---|---|---|---|
| Conservative | William Sydney Hylton Jolliffe | 372 | 50.8 | +13.3 |
| Liberal | William Nicholson | 361 | 49.2 | −13.3 |
| Majority | | 11 | 1.6 | N/A |
| Turnout | | 733 | 84.3 | +7.8 |
| Registered electors | | 870 | | |
| Conservative gain from Liberal | | Swing | +13.3 | |

=== Elections in the 1880s ===
General election 1880: Petersfield
| Party | Candidate | Votes | % | ±% |
|---|---|---|---|---|
| Liberal | William Nicholson | 406 | 55.9 | +6.7 |
| Conservative | William Sydney Hylton Jolliffe | 320 | 44.1 | −6.7 |
| Majority | | 86 | 11.8 | N/A |
| Turnout | | 726 | 90.6 | +6.3 |
| Registered electors | | 801 | | |
| Liberal gain from Conservative | | Swing | +6.7 | |

General election 1885: Petersfield
| Party | Candidate | Votes | % | ±% |
|---|---|---|---|---|
| Liberal | Viscount Wolmer | 3,414 | 49.9 | −6.0 |
| Liberal-Conservative | William Nicholson | 3,253 | 47.5 | +3.4 |
| Ind. Conservative | Douglas Henty | 179 | 2.6 | New |
| Majority | | 161 | 2.4 | −9.4 |
| Turnout | | 6,846 | 83.5 | −7.1 |
| Registered electors | | 8,202 | | |
| Liberal hold | | Swing | −4.7 | |

General election 1886: Petersfield
| Party | Candidate | Votes | % | ±% |
|---|---|---|---|---|
| Liberal Unionist | Viscount Wolmer | 3,188 | 50.9 | +1.0 |
| Liberal-Conservative | William Nicholson | 3,077 | 49.1 | +1.6 |
| Majority | | 111 | 1.8 | N/A |
| Turnout | | 6,265 | 76.4 | −7.1 |
| Registered electors | | 8,202 | | |
| Liberal Unionist gain from Liberal | | Swing | N/A | |

=== Elections in the 1890s ===
Wickham

General election 1892: Petersfield
| Party | Candidate | Votes | % | ±% |
|---|---|---|---|---|
| Conservative | William Wickham | 3,912 | 56.5 | +5.6 |
| Liberal | John Bonham-Carter | 3,008 | 43.5 | −5.6 |
| Majority | | 904 | 13.0 | +11.2 |
| Turnout | | 6,920 | 82.1 | +5.7 |
| Registered electors | | 8,431 | | |
| Conservative hold | | Swing | +5.6 | |

General election 1895: Petersfield
| Party | Candidate | Votes | % | ±% |
|---|---|---|---|---|
| Conservative | William Wickham | Unopposed | | |
| Conservative hold | | | | |

Nicholson

1897 Petersfield by-election
| Party | Candidate | Votes | % | ±% |
|---|---|---|---|---|
| Conservative | William Nicholson | 3,748 | 53.0 | N/A |
| Liberal | John Bonham-Carter | 3,328 | 47.0 | New |
| Majority | | 420 | 6.0 | N/A |
| Turnout | | 7,076 | 83.5 | N/A |
| Registered electors | | 8,474 | | |
| Conservative hold | | Swing | N/A | |

=== Elections in the 1900s ===
General election 1900: Petersfield
| Party | Candidate | Votes | % | ±% |
|---|---|---|---|---|
| Conservative | William Nicholson | Unopposed | | |
| Conservative hold | | | | |

General election 1906: Petersfield
| Party | Candidate | Votes | % | ±% |
|---|---|---|---|---|
| Conservative | William Nicholson | 4,349 | 50.6 | N/A |
| Liberal | Hugh Money-Coutts | 4,253 | 49.4 | New |
| Majority | | 96 | 1.2 | N/A |
| Turnout | | 8,602 | 86.2 | N/A |
| Registered electors | | 9,983 | | |
| Conservative hold | | Swing | N/A | |

=== Elections in the 1910s ===
General election January 1910: Petersfield
| Party | Candidate | Votes | % | ±% |
|---|---|---|---|---|
| Conservative | William Nicholson | 6,279 | 63.6 | +13.0 |
| Liberal | Herbert Arthur Baker | 3,594 | 36.4 | −13.0 |
| Majority | | 2,685 | 27.2 | +26.0 |
| Turnout | | 9,873 | 88.9 | +2.7 |
| Registered electors | | 11,110 | | |
| Conservative hold | | Swing | +13.0 | |

General election December 1910: Petersfield
| Party | Candidate | Votes | % | ±% |
|---|---|---|---|---|
| Conservative | William Nicholson | Unopposed | | |
| Conservative hold | | | | |

General election 1918: Petersfield
| Party | | Candidate | Votes | % | ±% |
|---|---|---|---|---|---|
| C | Unionist | William Nicholson | 10,730 | 71.5 | N/A |
| | Labour | John Pile | 4,267 | 28.5 | New |
| Majority | | | 6,463 | 43.0 | N/A |
| Turnout | | | 14,997 | 52.7 | N/A |
| | Unionist hold | | Swing | | |
C indicates candidate endorsed by the coalition government.

=== Elections in the 1920s ===
General election 1922: Petersfield
| Party | Candidate | Votes | % | ±% |
|---|---|---|---|---|
| Unionist | William Nicholson | 12,600 | 64.2 | −7.3 |
| Labour | Dudley Aman | 7,036 | 35.8 | +7.3 |
| Majority | | 5,564 | 28.4 | −14.6 |
| Turnout | | 19,636 | 65.7 | +13.0 |
| Unionist hold | | Swing | -7.3 | |

General election 1923: Petersfield
| Party | Candidate | Votes | % | ±% |
|---|---|---|---|---|
| Unionist | William Nicholson | 12,195 | 65.6 | +1.4 |
| Labour | Dudley Aman | 6,403 | 34.4 | −1.4 |
| Majority | | 5,792 | 31.2 | +2.8 |
| Turnout | | 18,598 | 60.6 | −5.1 |
| Unionist hold | | Swing | +1.4 | |

General election 1924: Petersfield
| Party | Candidate | Votes | % | ±% |
|---|---|---|---|---|
| Unionist | William Nicholson | 14,646 | 69.8 | +4.2 |
| Liberal | George Spencer | 3,755 | 17.9 | New |
| Labour | George Gilbert Desmond | 2,582 | 12.3 | −22.1 |
| Majority | | 10,891 | 51.9 | +20.7 |
| Turnout | | 20,983 | 66.3 | +5.7 |
| Unionist hold | | Swing | | |

General election 1929: Petersfield
| Party | Candidate | Votes | % | ±% |
|---|---|---|---|---|
| Unionist | William Nicholson | 15,605 | 55.0 | −14.8 |
| Liberal | Gerald Bailey | 9,334 | 32.9 | +15.0 |
| Labour | Gertrude Speedwell Massingham | 3,418 | 12.1 | −0.2 |
| Majority | | 6,271 | 22.1 | −29.8 |
| Turnout | | 28,357 | 68.2 | +1.9 |
| Unionist hold | | Swing | -14.9 | |

=== Elections in the 1930s ===
General election 1931: Petersfield
| Party | Candidate | Votes | % | ±% |
|---|---|---|---|---|
| Conservative | William Nicholson | 26,081 | 88.0 | +33.0 |
| Labour | AE Albery | 3,559 | 12.0 | −0.1 |
| Majority | | 22,522 | 76.0 | +53.9 |
| Turnout | | 29,640 | 67.8 | −0.4 |
| Conservative hold | | Swing | | |

- Liberal candidate Gerald Bailey withdrew at the last minute.

General election 1935: Petersfield
| Party | Candidate | Votes | % | ±% |
|---|---|---|---|---|
| Conservative | Reginald Dorman-Smith | 22,877 | 79.1 | −8.9 |
| Labour | John Ernest Lionel Birch | 6,061 | 20.9 | +8.9 |
| Majority | | 16,816 | 58.1 | −17.9 |
| Turnout | | 28,938 | 63.4 | −4.4 |
| Conservative hold | | Swing | -8.9 | |

General Election 1939–40:

Another General Election was required to take place before the end of 1940. The political parties had been making preparations for an election to take place and by the Autumn of 1939, the following candidates had been selected;

- Conservative: Reginald Dorman-Smith
- Liberal: Basil Goldstone
- Labour: D Muir Hunter
- British Union: Muriel G Whinfield

=== Elections in the 1940s ===
1941 Petersfield by-election
| Party | Candidate | Votes | % | ±% |
|---|---|---|---|---|
| Conservative | George Jeffreys | Unopposed | N/A | N/A |
| Conservative hold | | | | |

General election 1945: Petersfield
| Party | Candidate | Votes | % | ±% |
|---|---|---|---|---|
| Conservative | George Jeffreys | 20,838 | 58.4 | −20.7 |
| Liberal | Basil Goldstone | 8,269 | 23.2 | New |
| Common Wealth | Thomas Sargant | 6,600 | 18.5 | New |
| Majority | | 12,569 | 35.2 | −22.9 |
| Turnout | | 35,707 | 64.4 | +1.0 |
| Conservative hold | | Swing | | |

=== Elections in the 1950s ===
General election 1950: Petersfield
| Party | Candidate | Votes | % | ±% |
|---|---|---|---|---|
| Conservative | George Jeffreys | 27,401 | 55.15 | |
| Labour | I Candy | 15,472 | 31.14 | New |
| Liberal | Harold Hugh Lindsay Dickson | 6,813 | 13.71 | |
| Majority | | 11,929 | 24.01 | |
| Turnout | | 49,686 | 78.36 | |
| Conservative hold | | Swing | | |

General election 1951: Petersfield
| Party | Candidate | Votes | % | ±% |
|---|---|---|---|---|
| Conservative | Peter Legh | 29,845 | 58.75 | |
| Labour | Edward E Preidel | 15,770 | 31.05 | |
| Liberal | Harold Hugh Lindsay Dickson | 5,182 | 10.20 | |
| Majority | | 14,075 | 27.70 | |
| Turnout | | 50,797 | 77.84 | |
| Conservative hold | | Swing | | |

General election 1955: Petersfield
| Party | Candidate | Votes | % | ±% |
|---|---|---|---|---|
| Conservative | Peter Legh | 24,826 | 69.81 | |
| Labour | Frederick R Mason | 10,736 | 30.19 | |
| Majority | | 14,090 | 39.62 | |
| Turnout | | 35,562 | 69.74 | |
| Conservative hold | | Swing | | |

General election 1959: Petersfield
| Party | Candidate | Votes | % | ±% |
|---|---|---|---|---|
| Conservative | Peter Legh | 23,687 | 60.93 | |
| Labour | John Stuart Paul Davey | 8,278 | 21.29 | |
| Liberal | Richard Michael Digby | 6,912 | 17.78 | New |
| Majority | | 15,409 | 39.64 | |
| Turnout | | 38,877 | 73.64 | |
| Conservative hold | | Swing | | |

=== Elections in the 1960s ===
1960 Petersfield by-election
| Party | Candidate | Votes | % | ±% |
|---|---|---|---|---|
| Conservative | Joan Quennell | 15,613 | 54.40 | −6.53 |
| Liberal | Michael Digby | 8,310 | 28.95 | +11.17 |
| Labour | William Royle | 4,777 | 16.64 | −4.65 |
| Majority | | 7,303 | 25.45 | −14.19 |
| Turnout | | 28,700 | | |
| Conservative hold | | Swing | | |

General election 1964: Petersfield
| Party | Candidate | Votes | % | ±% |
|---|---|---|---|---|
| Conservative | Joan Quennell | 23,603 | 54.00 | |
| Liberal | Michael Digby | 11,338 | 25.94 | |
| Labour | M C Wilson | 8,477 | 19.39 | |
| Independent Loyalist | Rosine de Bounevialle | 292 | 0.67 | New |
| Majority | | 12,265 | 28.06 | |
| Turnout | | 43,710 | 75.50 | |
| Conservative hold | | Swing | | |

General election 1966: Petersfield
| Party | Candidate | Votes | % | ±% |
|---|---|---|---|---|
| Conservative | Joan Quennell | 23,933 | 52.33 | |
| Liberal | Michael Digby | 10,931 | 23.90 | |
| Labour | M C Wilson | 10,874 | 23.77 | |
| Majority | | 13,002 | 28.43 | |
| Turnout | | 45,738 | 75.72 | |
| Conservative hold | | Swing | | |

=== Elections in the 1970s ===
General election 1970: Petersfield
| Party | Candidate | Votes | % | ±% |
|---|---|---|---|---|
| Conservative | Joan Quennell | 30,414 | 60.50 | |
| Labour | Kelvin Horrocks | 10,307 | 20.50 | |
| Liberal | Penelope Jessel | 7,783 | 15.48 | |
| Independent | Michael Digby | 1,766 | 3.51 | New |
| Majority | | 20,107 | 40.00 | |
| Turnout | | 50,270 | 72.12 | |
| Conservative hold | | Swing | | |

General election February 1974: Petersfield
| Party | Candidate | Votes | % | ±% |
|---|---|---|---|---|
| Conservative | Joan Quennell | 30,732 | 51.49 | |
| Liberal | Timothy Willatt Slack | 21,152 | 35.44 | |
| Labour | PF Whitely | 7,703 | 12.91 | |
| Technical Consultant | PHH Bishop | 101 | 0.17 | New |
| Majority | | 9,580 | 16.05 | |
| Turnout | | 59,688 | 81.13 | |
| Conservative hold | | Swing | | |

General election October 1974: Petersfield
| Party | Candidate | Votes | % | ±% |
|---|---|---|---|---|
| Conservative | Michael Mates | 28,689 | 50.50 | |
| Liberal | Timothy Willatt Slack | 19,702 | 34.68 | |
| Labour | JM Bloom | 8,301 | 14.61 | |
| United Democratic Party | PHH Bishop | 117 | 0.21 | New |
| Majority | | 8,987 | 15.82 | |
| Turnout | | 56,809 | 76.50 | |
| Conservative hold | | Swing | | |

General election 1979: Petersfield
| Party | Candidate | Votes | % | ±% |
|---|---|---|---|---|
| Conservative | Michael Mates | 39,200 | 61.15 | |
| Liberal | John Madeley | 16,825 | 26.25 | |
| Labour | BW Clough | 8,082 | 12.61 | |
| Majority | | 22,375 | 34.90 | |
| Turnout | | 64,107 | 78.29 | |
| Conservative hold | | Swing | | |

== Sources ==
- Leigh Rayment's Historical List of MPs – Constituencies beginning with "P" (part 1)
- Robert Beatson, (London: Longman, Hurst, Res & Orme, 1807) A Chronological Register of Both Houses of Parliament Google Books
