= Edward Gibbon (died 1770) =

British Member of Parliament (1707–1770)

Edward Gibbon (1707–1770) was an 18th-century English MP: for Petersfield from 1734 to 1741; and Southampton from 1741 to 1747.

Gibbon was the only son of Edward Gibbon of Putney and his wife Catherine née Acton. He was educated at Westminster School and Emmanuel College, Cambridge; after which he did the Grand Tour. On 3 June 1736 he married Judith née Porten: their son became the historian Edward Gibbon. Judith died in December 1747; and on 8 April 1755 he married secondly Dorothea née Patten.

On 12 June 1759 he was appointed Major of the South Hampshire Militia when that regiment was embodied during the Seven Years' War (his son served as Captain of the regiment's Grenadier Company).

Parliament of Great Britain
| Preceded by Norton Powlett | Member of Parliament for Petersfield; 1734–1741; With: William Jolliffe | Succeeded by John Jolliffe |
| Preceded by Thomas Lee Dummer | Member of Parliament for Southampton; 1741–1747; With: Peter Delmé | Succeeded by Anthony Langley Swymmer |
