= William Jolliffe (died 1750) =

British Member of Parliament (1660–1750)

William Jolliffe (1660–1750) was an English politician who was a member of parliament for Petersfield from 1734 to 1741.

Jolliffe was the eldest son of John Jolliffe, M.P. for Heytesbury in the Convention Parliament and his wife Rebecca née Boothby. He was returned as a Whig in the interest of his nephew John Jolliffe.

Parliament of Great Britain
| Preceded by Norton Powlett | Member of Parliament for Petersfield; 1734–1741; With: Edward Gibbon | Succeeded by John Jolliffe |
