= John Jolliffe (librarian) =

British librarian and academic

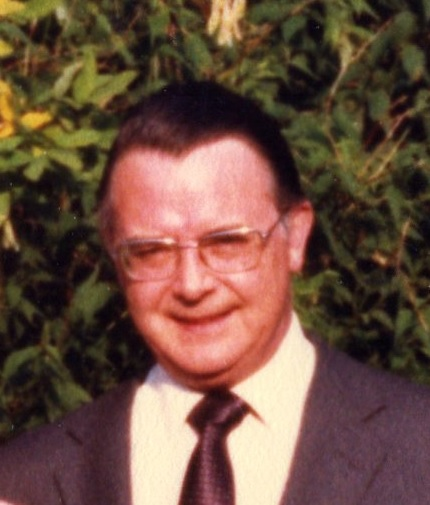
- Jolliffe in 1982
- Born: 15 July 1929
- Died: 30 March 1985 (aged 55)
- Education: University College London
- Occupation: Librarian
- Employer: University of Oxford
- Known for: Serving as Bodley's Librarian from 1982 until his death
- Spouse: Beryl Bailey (1955–his death)
- Children: 3

John William Jolliffe (15 July 1929 – 30 March 1985) was a British librarian and academic who was Bodley's Librarian (head of the Bodleian Library at the University of Oxford) from 1982 until his death.

== Life ==
Jolliffe was born in Hastings in 1929. His parents were William Jolliffe and Gwendolen Gadd. Jolliffe was educated at Hastings Grammar School before studying French at University College London. Jolliffe married Beryl Bailey, with whom he would go on to have three daughters. He was appointed Assistant Keeper in the Department of Printed Books at the British Museum in 1955, moving to Oxford to become Keeper of Catalogues at the Bodleian Library in 1970. He was a fellow of Nuffield College, Oxford from 1971 onwards. He became Bodley's Librarian in 1982 at a time of budget cuts, having earlier been Acting Librarian.

His publications included various articles on his specialist area of 16th-century French literature. He was also an early leader in the use of computers for cataloguing old books; between 1968 and 1974, he directed a project examining proposals for cataloguing early books in the university libraries of Oxford, Cambridge, and London, and the report was published in 1974 as Computers and Early Books.

Joliffe was involved in the development of the use of computers in the Bodleian Library. He died in 1985 after a short illness, aged 55. On his death, his colleague Julian Roberts became Acting Librarian at the Bodleian.
