= William Jolliffe, 1st Baron Hylton =

British soldier and Conservative politician (1800–1876)

The Right Honourable The Lord Hylton PC

Parliamentary Secretary to the Treasury
- In office 2 March 1858 – 11 June 1859
- Monarch: Victoria
- Prime Minister: The Earl of Derby
- Preceded by: William Goodenough Hayter
- Succeeded by: Hon. Henry Brand

Parliamentary Under-Secretary of State for the Home Department
- In office 27 February 1852 – 17 December 1852
- Monarch: Victoria
- Prime Minister: The Earl of Derby
- Preceded by: Hon. Edward Pleydell-Bouverie
- Succeeded by: Hon. Henry FitzRoy

Member of the House of Lords Lord Temporal
- In office 16 July 1866 – 1 June 1876; Hereditary Peerage
- Preceded by: Peerge created
- Succeeded by: The 2nd Lord Hylton

Member of Parliament for Petersfield
- In office 22 July 1841 – 16 July 1866
- Preceded by: Cornthwaite Hector
- Succeeded by: William Nicholson
- In office 18 August 1837 – 1838
- Preceded by: Cornthwaite Hector
- Succeeded by: Cornthwaite Hector
- In office 1 September 1830 – 8 December 1832
- Preceded by: Hylton Jolliffe
- Succeeded by: John Shaw Lefevre

Personal details
- Born: 7 December 1800
- Died: 1 June 1876 (aged 75) Merstham House, near Reigate, Surrey
- Party: Conservative
- Spouse(s): (1) Eleanor Paget (2) Sophia Sheffield

William George Hylton Jolliffe, 1st Baron Hylton PC (7 December 1800 – 1 June 1876), known as Sir William Jolliffe, Bt, between 1821 and 1866, was a British soldier and Conservative politician. He was a member of the Earl of Derby's first two administrations as Under-Secretary of State for the Home Department in 1852 and as Parliamentary Secretary to the Treasury between 1858 and 1859.

== Background ==
Jolliffe was the son of Reverend William John Jolliffe, the son of William Jolliffe and his wife Eleanor Hylton, daughter and heir of Sir Richard Hylton, 5th Baronet (who had assumed the surname of Hylton in lieu of his patronymic Musgrave; see Musgrave Baronets) and his wife Anne, sister and co-heiress of John Hylton, de jure 18th Baron Hylton. Jolliffe first served in the Army and achieved the rank of captain in the 15th Dragoons. He notably took part in the events at St Peter's Field in Manchester in 1819 (the "Peterloo Massacre"). In 1821, at the age of twenty, Jolliffe was created a Baronet, of Merstham in the County of Surrey.

== Political career ==
Jolliffe served a year as High Sheriff of Surrey in 1830 and then sat as a Member of Parliament for Petersfield from 1830 to 1832, 1837 to 1838 and 1841 to 1866 and served under the Earl of Derby as Under-Secretary of State for the Home Department in 1852 and as Parliamentary Secretary to the Treasury from 1858 to 1859. He was admitted to the Privy Council in 1859 and in 1866 he was raised to the peerage as Baron Hylton, of Hylton in the County Palatine of Durham and of Petersfield in the County of Southampton.

== Cricket ==
Jolliffe played a single match for Hampshire in 1825 against Sussex. Jolliffe scored 12 runs in the match.

== Family ==
Lord Hylton married, firstly, Eleanor Paget, daughter of the Hon. Berkeley Thomas Paget, in 1825. Their eldest son Hylton Jolliffe was a captain in the Coldstream Guards but died from cholera during the Crimean War. Hylton married, secondly, Sophia Penelope, daughter of Sir Robert Sheffield, 4th Baronet, and widow of William Fox-Strangways, 4th Earl of Ilchester, in 1867. He died at Merstham House near Reigate on 1 June 1876, aged 75, and was succeeded in his titles by his second but eldest surviving son from his first marriage, Hedworth. His granddaughter Gertrude Crawford became the first commandant of the Women's Royal Air Force.

Parliament of the United Kingdom
Preceded by Hylton Jolliffe; William Marshall	Member of Parliament for Petersfield; 1830–1832; With: Gilbert East Jolliffe	Succeeded by John Shaw-Lefevre
Preceded by Cornthwaite Hector	Member of Parliament for Petersfield; 1837–1838	Succeeded by Cornthwaite Hector
Preceded by Cornthwaite Hector	Member of Parliament for Petersfield; 1841–1866	Succeeded by William Nicholson
Political offices
Preceded by Hon. Edward Pleydell-Bouverie	Under-Secretary of State for the Home Department; 1852	Succeeded by Hon. Henry FitzRoy
Preceded by William Goodenough Hayter	Parliamentary Secretary to the Treasury; 1858–1859	Succeeded by Henry Brand
Peerage of the United Kingdom
New creation	Baron Hylton; 2nd creation 1866–1876	Succeeded by Hedworth Hylton Jolliffe
Baronetage of the United Kingdom
New creation	Baronet (of Merstham); 1821–1876	Succeeded by Hedworth Hylton Jolliffe
