= Ralph Bourchier =

16th-century English politician

Sir Ralph Bourchier (c. 1531 – 11 June 1598) was an English landowner, administrator and politician.

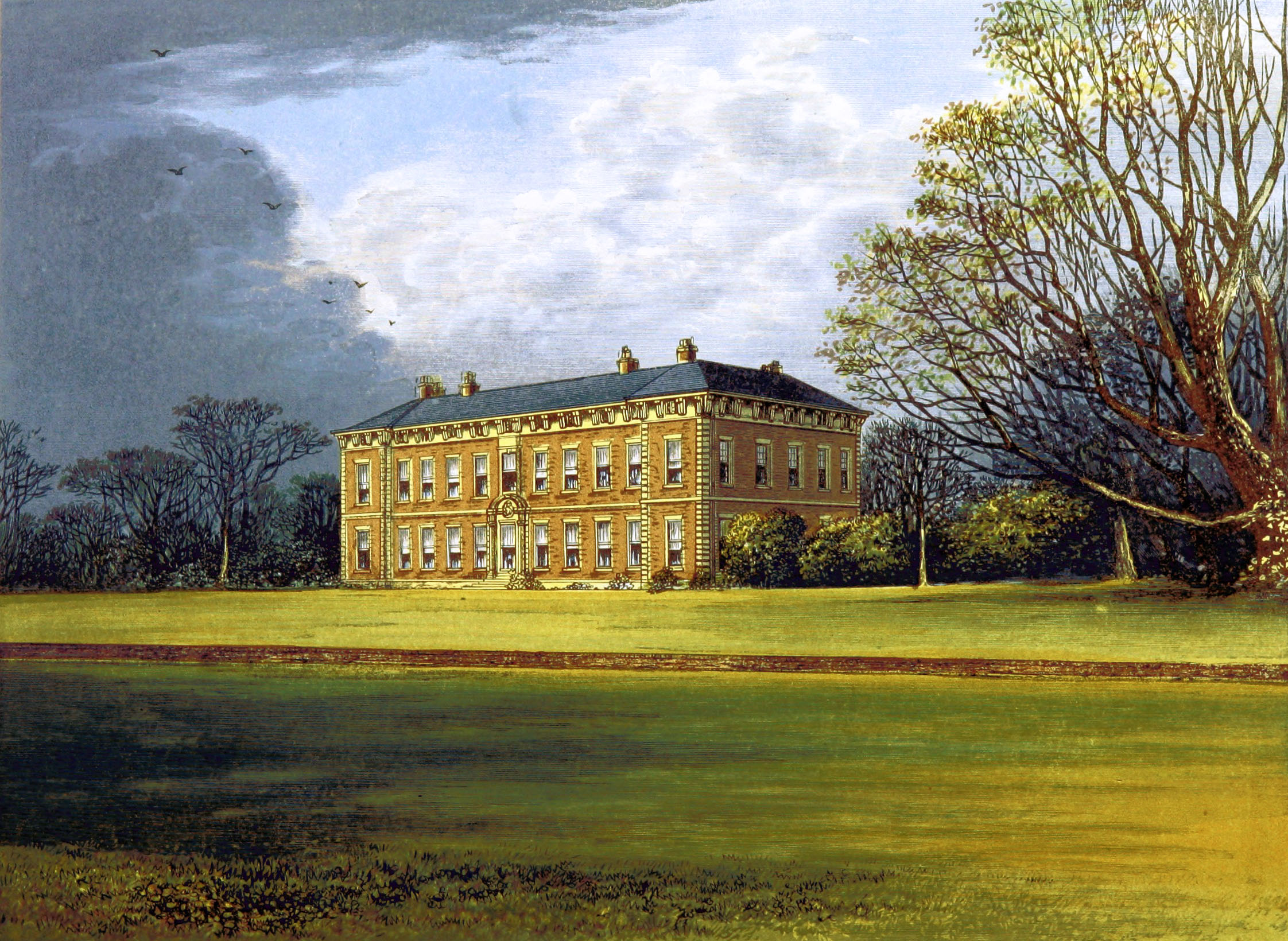
Beningbrough Hall, 1880

He was the son of James Bourchier of Haughton and Mary, heiress of her brother John Bannister. His grandfather was John Bourchier, 2nd Baron Berners. In 1556 he inherited estates in Yorkshire from his uncle, John Bannister, on which he built Beningbrough Hall (since rebuilt in 1716).

He was appointed keeper of Rochester Castle in 1559.

He was elected to Parliament in 1571 and 1572 as MP for Newcastle-under-Lyme. He was subsequently returned for Newport, Isle of Wight in 1584, and Scarborough in 1586, and as knight of the shire for Yorkshire. He served as sheriff of Yorkshire in 1580 and was knighted in 1584.

He died in 1598 and was buried in Barking, Essex. He had married three times: first Elizabeth, the daughter of Francis Hall of Grantham, Lincolnshire, with whom he had two sons and four daughters; second Christian, the daughter of Rowland Shakerley of London and widow of John Harding of London; and third Anne Coote, a widow. His estate went to his grandson Robert, as his son William was declared insane. Robert died childless at 18 and the estate then passed to Robert's brother John, who subscribed as an adventurer for Virginia in 1620 and was one of the signatories to King Charles' death warrant in 1649.
