= Ralph Nicholson (cricketer) =

English cricketer (1816–1879)

Personal information
- Full name: Ralph Charles Nicholson
- Born: May/June 1816; Slaugham, Sussex, England
- Died: 16 July 1879 (aged 63); Newell, Iowa, United States
- Batting: Unknown
- Relatives: William Nicholson (brother); John Nicholson (brother); Richard Nicholson (brother)

Domestic team information
- Years: Team
- 1842: Marylebone Cricket Club

Career statistics
Competition	First-class
Matches	4
Runs scored	39
Batting average	6.50
100s/50s	–/–
Top score	29*
Catches/stumpings	5/–
- Source: Cricinfo, 4 August 2020

Ralph Charles Nicholson (May/June 1816 – 16 July 1879) was an English first-class cricketer.

The son of John Nicholson, he was born in 1816 at Slaugham, Sussex. He was a member of the family which owned the J&W Nicholson & Co gin distillery based in Clerkenwell and Three Mills. Nicholson made four appearances in first-class cricket, firstly for the Gentlemen in the Gentlemen v Players fixture of 1841 at Lord's, before making three first-class appearances for the Marylebone Cricket Club in 1842 against Cambridge University, the North of England and Sussex. He scored 39 runs in his four first-class matches, at an average of 6.50 and a high score of 29 not out. Nicholson later emigrated to the United States, where he died in July 1879 at Newell, Iowa. His brother, William, was a distiller, politician and first-class cricketer. His brothers John and Richard were also first-class cricketers.
