= Elinor Frances Vallentin =

British botanist, author, and illustrator

- Born: Elinor Frances Bertrand; 14 January 1873; West Falkland, Falkland Islands
- Died: March 1924 (aged 51); Plympton, Devon
- Occupations: botanist; botanical illustrator
- Spouses: Robert Nichol (m.1894); Rupert Vallentin (m.1904)
- Children: 1
- Father: William Wickham Bertrand
- Relatives: Godfrey Bolles Lee (great-uncle); Bertram Chambers (brother-in-law)

Elinor Frances Vallentin (formerly Nichol; née Bertrand) (14 January 1873 – March 1924) was a British botanist and botanical illustrator who made scientifically significant collections of botany specimens in the Falkland Islands. She co-authored the book Illustrations of the flowering plants and ferns of the Falkland Islands in 1921 with Enid Mary Cotton, a fellow botanist. This work was regarded as being particularly valuable because of Vallentin's botanical illustrations. The standard author abbreviation Vallentin is used to indicate this person as the author when citing a botanical name.

== Early life ==
Elinor Frances Bertrand was born on West Falkland, Falkland Islands on 14 January 1873, to William Wickham Bertrand and his wife Catherine Beatrice (née Felton). Where she grew up first at Shallow bay but later moved to Roy Cove. Vallentin’s father was a farmer, who came from a old landowning family in Dominica and was also English through his mother Frances, having been educated in England under the care of his maternal uncle Godfrey Bolles Lee. Her mother was the daughter of English soldier Henry Felton (1798 – 1876).

== Plant collecting ==
While living at Roy Cove and Shallow Bay she collected and studied the plant life in the surrounding area. From November 1909 to March 1911 she collected numerous specimens from various sites on West Falkland, which are now held at the British Museum, Royal Botanical Gardens, Kew and the Manchester Museum. She also assembled collections of seaweeds that were particularly valuable scientifically. She collaborated with Arthur Disbrowe Cotton, supplying him with specimens, and enabling him to undertake the first comprehensive study of Cryptogams from the Falkland Islands.

Vallentin also collaborated with botanist Charles Henry Wright collecting plants for him, supplying him with field notes and illustrations, as well as illustrating his scientific paper The Mosses and Hepaticae of West Falkland Islands, from the collections of Mrs. Elinor Vallentin published in the Botanical Journal of the Linnean Society.

In 1912 Vallentin presented her collection of some 930 plant specimens, collected in the West Falkland Islands, to Kew.

== Illustrations ==
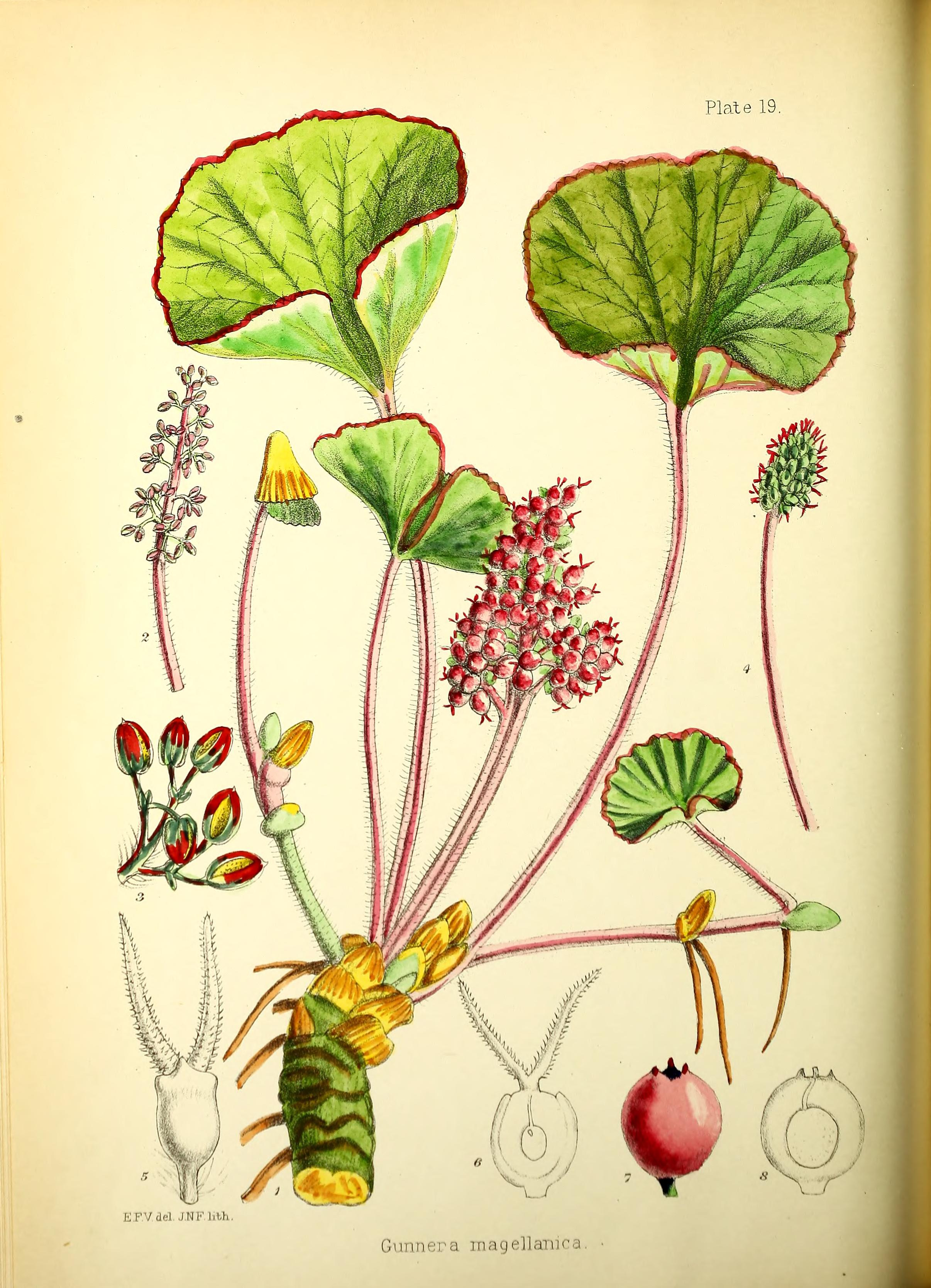
Gunnera magellanica Lam.

As well as illustrating scientific papers, Vallentin co-wrote and illustrated the book Illustrations of the flowering plants and ferns of the Falkland Islands.

Cecil Victor Boley Marquand regarded Vallentin's drawings as being "beautiful". Vallentin also exhibited her illustrations at the 73rd Exhibition of the Royal Cornwall Polytechnic Society in 1912 as well as at the 1924 British Empire Exhibition at the Falkland Islands Court.

The Manchester Museum holds some of the specimens Vallentin used to produce her coloured illustrations.

== Publications ==
- Illustrations of the flowering plants and ferns of the Falkland Island by Mrs E. F. Vallentin with descriptions by Mrs E. M. Cotton (London, L. Reeve & Co., 1921)

== Family ==
=== History ===
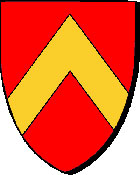
d’Anglebermes family coat of arms.

The Bertrand family has its origins in France, however following the revocation of the Edict of Nantes, emigrated to Geneva, Switzerland, becoming burghers in 1704 and began acquiring estates in Dominica in the late 18th century. Vallentin's patrilineal family name was originally d'Anglebermes (later spelt D’Angleberne & Dangleben) but when her great-grandfather, a French officer from Martinique, married her great-grandmother he assumed her family name (Bertrand) by royal license. Therefore becoming the heir to her family's estates in Dominica, later inherited by their grandson (Elinor's father), but were subsequently sold under the encumbered estates act as they had been heavily damaged by a hurricane.

=== Relations ===
Vallentin's father William Wickham Bertrand was the cousin of William Wickham who was the son of Henry Lewis Wickham and grandson of Eleanor (née Bertrand) and William Wickham. Eleanor's aunt Henriette Bertrand married Isaac Louis de Thellusson, son of Isaac de Thellusson.

Vallentin's sister Nora Bertrand married Admiral Bertram Chambers.

=== Marriage ===
In 1894 Elinor married Australian Falkland Islands Company manager Robert Nichol at Roy Cove. Nichol later became ill, and died in London in 1896.

In 1904 she married fellow botanist Rupert Eugene White Vallentin, son of Sir James Vallentin (1814–1870), Knight Sheriff of London, Distiller and grandfather of John Vallentin and Archibald Thomas Pechey. Together they had one child, a son named Thomas (b. 1913).
