= Holy Trinity Church, Privett =

Holy Trinity, Privett
- Church of the Holy Trinity, Privett, Hampshire
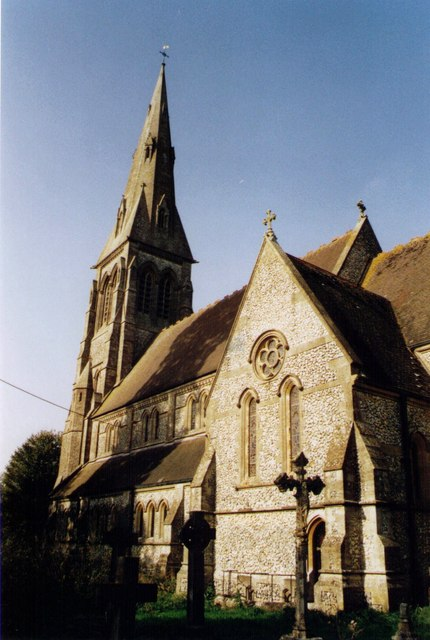
- The tower, part of the nave and the south chapel of Holy Trinity, Privett

- Location in Hampshire
- 51.0381°N 1.0362°W
- OS grid reference: SU 67672 26966
- Location: Privett, Hampshire
- Country: England
- Denomination: Anglican
- Website: Churches Conservation Trust

History
- Founder: William Nicholson

Architecture
- Functional status: Redundant
- Heritage designation: Grade II*
- Designated: 15 May 1978
- Architect: A. W. Blomfield
- Architectural type: Church
- Style: Gothic Revival, Early English style
- Groundbreaking: 1876
- Completed: 1878
- Construction cost: £22,000

Specifications
- Materials: Flint, red tile roofs

The Church of the Holy Trinity, Privett, is a redundant Anglican church in the parish of Froxfield and Privett, Hampshire, England. It is recorded in the National Heritage List for England as a Grade II* listed building, and is under the care of the Churches Conservation Trust.

== History ==
In 1863, William Nicholson of the firm of J&W Nicholson & Co, gin distillers, bought the nearby estate of Basing Park. Many of the buildings in Privett (now a conservation area) were built by him for workers on his estate, and the Church of the Holy Trinity was also built at his expense. It was designed by Sir A W Blomfield and built between 1876 and 1878. A Chapel of the Holy Trinity at Privett was first recorded in 1391, but any remaining evidence of it disappeared when the present church was built on the same site.

The size of the new church far outstripped the requirements of the small rural parish, and it was eventually declared redundant in 1975.

The tower retains its fine ring of eight bells, hung for traditional Change ringing, and are looked after by a team of volunteers from other nearby churches. The bells were cast in 1877 by the firm Mears & Stainbank, at Whitechapel Bell Foundry.

== Architecture ==
Sir Nikolaus Pevsner described the church as "exceptionally good" and like "a substantial town church".

The church, in Gothic Revival (Early English) style, is built of flint with Bath stone dressings. The chancel has north and south chapels or transepts, while the nave has four bays with aisles and clerestory, and a porch to the north. The tower, with broach spire, gargoyles, buttresses and three tiers of lucarnes, is 160 feet (48.8 m) high and forms a prominent landmark.

The nave has four-bay arcades, a lofty tower arch, a square font on pillars with stiff-leaf carving, a round stone pulpit and an intricate wrought iron lectern. The chancel is sumptuously appointed with a mosaic floor, sedilia and reredos with arcading.

=== Gallery ===
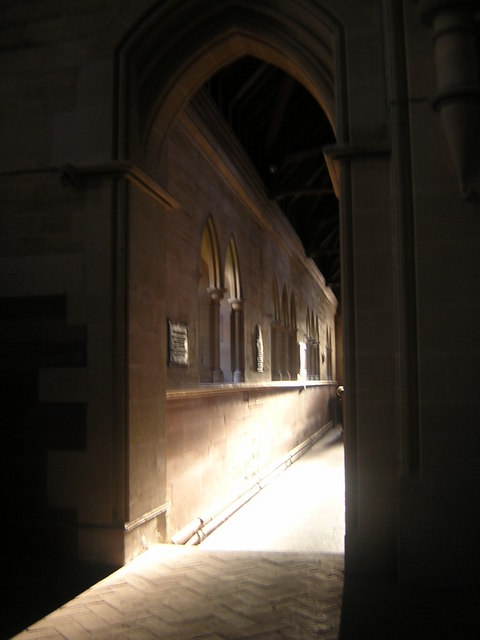
South aisle at Holy Trinity, seen from the chancel

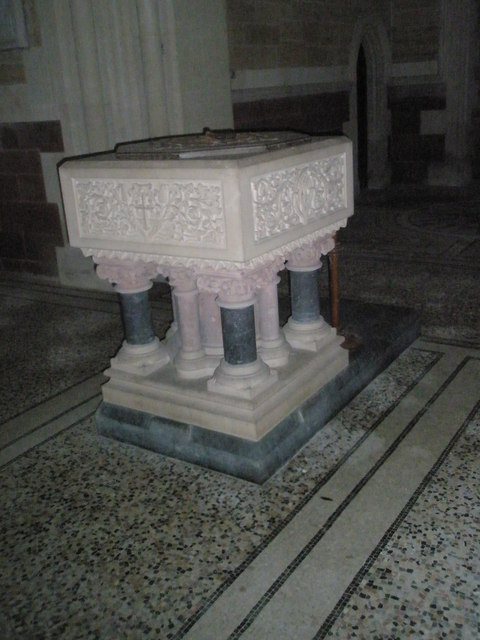
Font at Holy Trinity

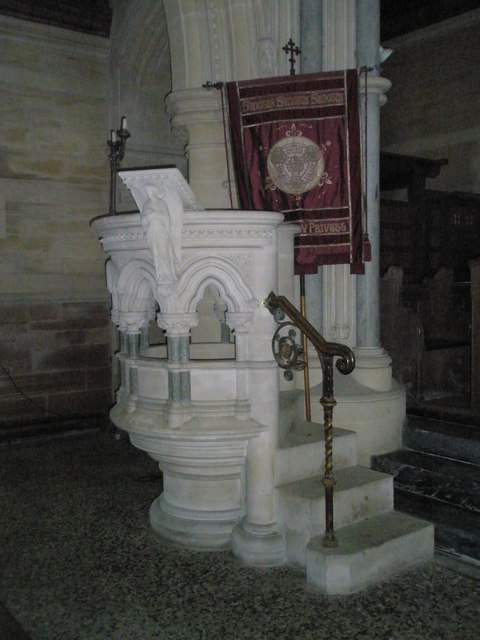
Pulpit at Holy Trinity

== See also ==
- List of churches preserved by the Churches Conservation Trust in Southeast England
