= Richard Nicholson (cricketer) =

English cricketer

Personal information
- Full name: Richard Payne Nicholson
- Born: 1814; Upper Clapton, Middlesex, England
- Died: 18 February 1845 (aged 30/31); Lisbon, Estremadura, Portugal
- Batting: Unknown
- Relatives: William Nicholson (brother); John Nicholson (brother); Ralph Nicholson (brother)

Domestic team information
- Years: Team
- 1841: Marylebone Cricket Club

Career statistics
Competition	First-class
Matches	2
Runs scored	2
Batting average	2.00
100s/50s	–/–
Top score	2
Catches/stumpings	10/–
- Source: Cricinfo, 4 August 2020

Richard Payne Nicholson (1814 – 18 February 1845) was an English first-class cricketer and distiller.

The son of John Nicholson, he was born in 1818 at Upper Clapton. He was a member of the family which owned the J&W Nicholson & Co gin distillery based in Clerkenwell and Three Mills. Nicholson made two appearances in first-class cricket, firstly for the Gentlemen in the Gentlemen v Players fixture of 1837 at Lord's, and secondly for the Marylebone Cricket Club against Cambridge Town Club at the same venue. He worked in the family business as a distiller alongside his brother, William, who was also a first-class cricketer and politician. He died in Portugal at Lisbon in February 1845. Brothers John and Ralph both also played first-class cricket.
