= Vallentin =

Vallentin is a surname. Notable people with the surname include:

- Elinor Frances Vallentin (1873–1924), British botanist and botanical illustrator active in the Falkland Islands
- Hermann Vallentin (1872–1945), German actor
- John Franks Vallentin (1882–1914), British military officer
