= Froxfield (disambiguation) =

Froxfield may refer to several places in England:

- Froxfield, a village and civil parish in Wiltshire
- Froxfield, Bedfordshire, a hamlet
- Froxfield and Privett, a civil parish in Hampshire, formerly called Froxfield
  - Froxfield Green, formerly Froxfield, a village in the parish
