= Verner Luckin =

English cricketer

Personal information
- Full name: Verner Valentine Luckin
- Born: 14 February 1892; Woking, Surrey, England
- Died: 28 November 1931 (aged 39); High Cross, Hampshire, England
- Batting: Left-handed
- Bowling: Leg break googly

Domestic team information
- Years: Team
- 1910–1912: Hampshire
- 1919: Warwickshire

Career statistics
Competition	First-class
Matches	19
Runs scored	212
Batting average	15.14
100s/50s	–/1
Top score	59*
Balls bowled	1,475
Wickets	24
Bowling average	35.20
5 wickets in innings	–
10 wickets in match	–
Best bowling	3/19
Catches/stumpings	9/–
- Source: Cricinfo, 29 January 2010

Verner Valentine Luckin (14 February 1892 — 28 November 1931) was an English first-class cricketer.

Luckin was born at Woking in February 1892. Luckin was selected to trial for Hampshire in 1909, alongside Jack Moore. The following season, he made his debut in first-class cricket for Hampshire against Somerset at Aldershot in the County Championship, with the Hampshire Observer and Basingstoke News remarking that he "showed promising form" on debut. Luckin played three further first-class matches in 1910, before making five appearances in the 1911 County Championship. He made a final appearance for Hampshire in the 1912 County Championship against Middlesex. He had limited success with Hampshire, taking 13 wickets with his leg break googly bowling at an average of 39.46, with best figures of 3 for 39. As a lower order batsman, he scored 17 runs at an average of 2.42.

Luckin joined Moseley, of the Birmingham and District Cricket League, as their professional for the 1913 season, after they had lost the services of Percy Jeeves. He additionally joined the staff at Warwickshire. During the First World War, Luckin volunteered with a pals battalion in the Royal Warwickshire Regiment. Following the end of the war, Luckin debuted for Warwickshire in the 1919 County Championship, making nine first-class appearances in what was his only full season with the county. In this season, he took 11 wickets at an average of 30.18, with best figures of 3 for 19, while his batting saw a marked improvement with him scoring 195 runs at a batting average of 27.85, recording one half century.

After departing Warwickshire, he played for Ormskirk in the Liverpool and District Cricket Competition, playing for the club between 1920 and 1927. In August 1927, he signed to play for Eagley in the Bolton Cricket League. From there, he was appointed coach and groundsman at Huntly Cricket Club in Aberdeenshire for the 1931 season. After coaching Huntly for the season, Luckin returned home to Hampshire. There he became worried with not being able to find employment as either a groundskeeper or coach, taking his own life by hanging himself from a tree in the garden of his High Cross residence on 28 November 1931; his body was discovered by his wife.
