= Richard Nicholson =

Richard Nicholson may refer to:

- Richard Nicholson (Paralympian) (born 1970), Australian Paralympic powerlifter and athlete
- Richard Nicholson (musician) (1563–1638/39), English musician
- Richard Nicholson (rower) (born 1937), British rower
- Richard Nicholson (cricketer), English cricketer and distiller
