= 1897 Petersfield by-election =

By-election to determine the MP for Petersfield, England

The 1897 Petersfield by-election was held on 8 June 1897 after the death of the incumbent Conservative MP William Wickham. The seat was retained by the Conservative candidate William Graham Nicholson.

Nicholson

Petersfield by-election, 1897
Party	Candidate	Votes	%	±%
Conservative	William Graham Nicholson	3,748	53.0	N/A
Liberal	John Bonham-Carter	3,328	47.0	New
Majority		420	6.0	N/A
Turnout		7,076	83.5	N/A
Conservative hold		Swing	N/A	
