= Henry Wickham =

Henry Wickham may refer to:

- Sir Henry Wickham (explorer) (1846–1928), British explorer
- Henry Lewis Wickham (1789–1864), Receiver General of Gibraltar and principal private secretary to Lord Althorp
- Henry T. Wickham (1849–1943), American lawyer and politician in the Virginia Senate
- Henry Wickham Wickham (1800–1876), British Conservative party politician
