= Enid Mary Cotton =

Botanist and author

Enid Mary Cotton (née Jesson) (1 May 1889 Malvern, Victoria – 19 April 1956 Farnham Common) was an Australian-born English botanist who married Arthur Disbrowe Cotton in 1913/1915, raising a son and daughter.

She was the daughter of a mining engineer John Charles Jesson and Lilian née Dawson. On the family's return to England she worked at Kew and contributed text to Curtis's Botanical Magazine as well as Elinor Frances Vallentin's Illustrations of Flowering Plants of the Falkland Islands (1921).
