= HMS Bulwark (1899) =

Pre-dreadnought battleship of the British Royal Navy

Coordinates: 51°25.39′N 0°39.20′E

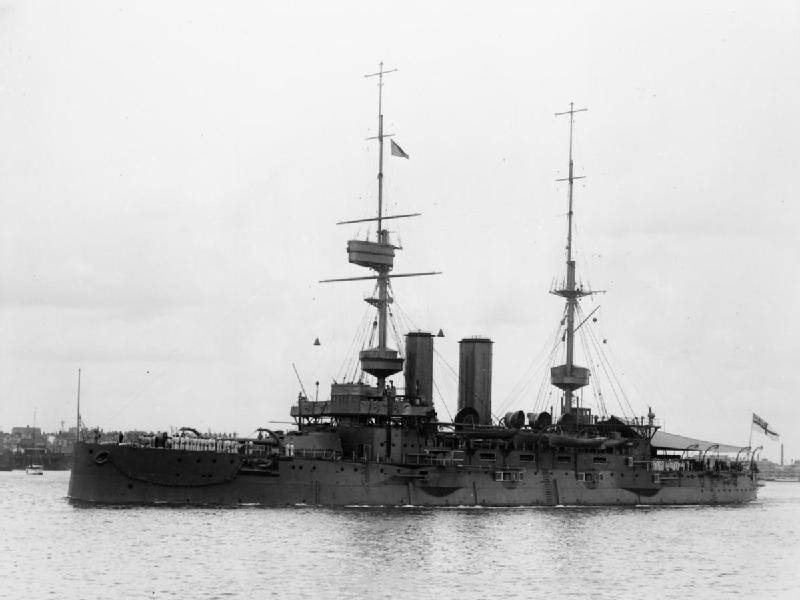
- Bulwark at anchor

History

United Kingdom
- Name: Bulwark
- Ordered: 27 June 1898
- Builder: HM Dockyard, Devonport
- Cost: £997,846
- Laid down: 20 March 1899
- Launched: 18 October 1899
- Christened: By Lady Harriet Fairfax
- Completed: March 1902
- Commissioned: 18 March 1902
- Fate: Destroyed by internal explosion, 26 November 1914

General characteristics
- Class & type: London-class pre-dreadnought battleship
- Displacement: 15,366 long tons (15,613 t) (normal); 15,955 long tons (16,211 t) (deep load)
- Length: 431 ft 9 in (131.6 m) (o/a)
- Beam: 75 ft (22.9 m)
- Draught: 28 ft 2 in (8.59 m) (deep load)
- Installed power: 20 × Belleville boilers; 15,000 ihp (11,000 kW)
- Propulsion: 2 × Triple-expansion steam engines; 2 × Propellers
- Speed: 18 knots (33 km/h; 21 mph)
- Range: 5,550 nmi (10,280 km; 6,390 mi) at 10 knots (19 km/h; 12 mph)
- Complement: 738; 789 as flagship
- Armament: 4 × BL 12 in (305 mm) guns; 12 × BL 6 in (152 mm) guns; 16 × QF 12-pdr (3 in (76 mm)) guns; 6 × QF 3-pdr 47 mm (1.9 in) guns; 4 × 18 in (450 mm) torpedo tubes
- Armour: Belt: 9 in (229 mm); Bulkhead: 9–12 in (229–305 mm); Barbettes: 12 in (305 mm); Turrets: 8 in (203 mm); Casemates: 6 in (152 mm); Conning tower: 14 in (356 mm); Deck: 1–2.5 in (25–64 mm)

HMS Bulwark was one of five London-class pre-dreadnought battleships built for the Royal Navy at the end of the 19th century. The Londons were a sub-class of the Formidable-class pre-dreadnoughts. Completed in 1902 she was initially assigned to the Mediterranean Fleet as its flagship. The ship then served with the Channel and Home Fleets from 1907 to 1910, usually as a flagship. From 1910 to 1914, she was in reserve in the Home Fleet.

Following the start of the First World War in August 1914, Bulwark, along with the rest of the squadron, was attached to the reformed Channel Fleet to protect the British Expeditionary Force as it moved across the English Channel to France. On 26 November 1914 she was destroyed by a large internal explosion with the loss of 741 men near Sheerness; only a dozen men survived the detonation. It was probably caused by the overheating of cordite charges that had been placed adjacent to a boiler-room bulkhead. Little of the ship survived to be salvaged and her remains were designated a controlled site under the Protection of Military Remains Act 1986. Diving on the wreck is generally forbidden.

== Design and description ==
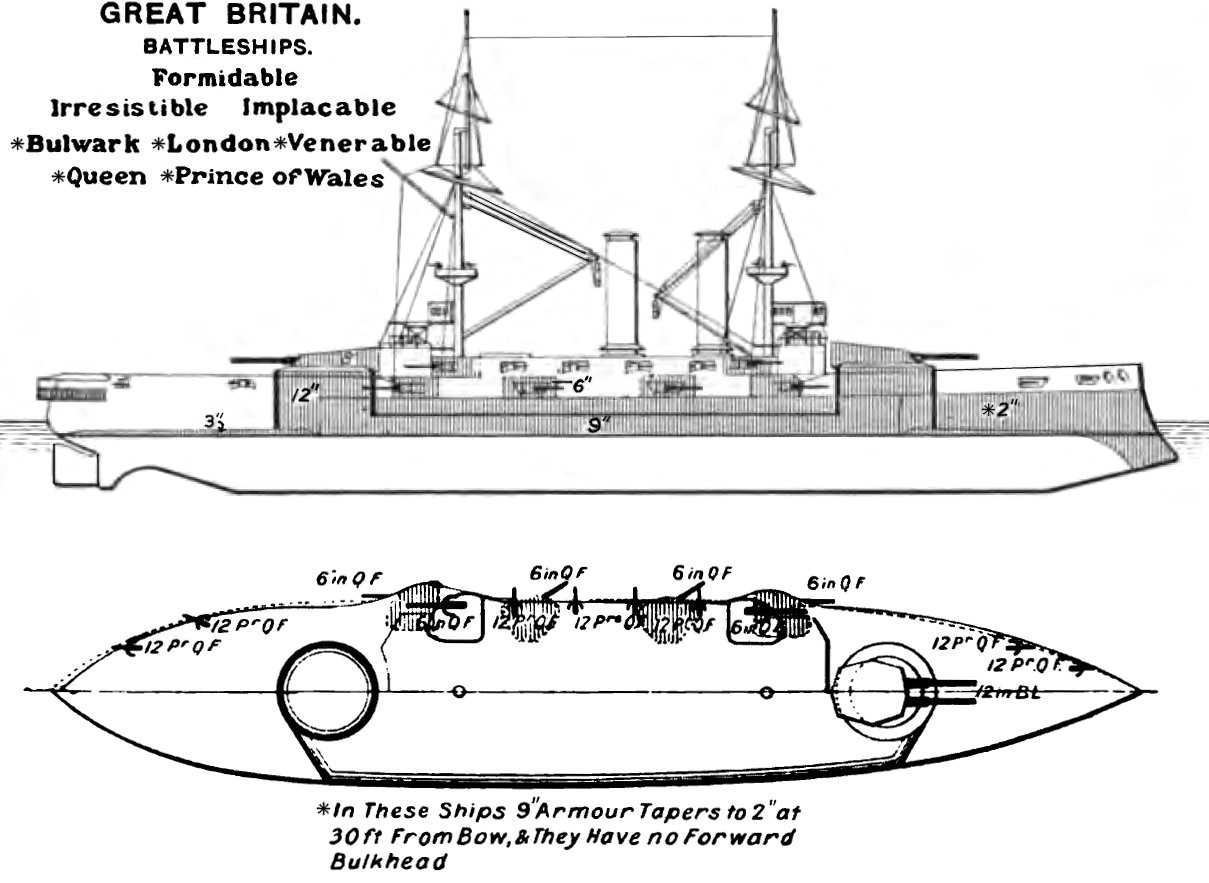
Right plan and elevation of the Formidable class from Brassey's Naval Annual; the Londons were identical in appearance

The five ships of the London class (Note: Some contemporary sources refer to them as the Venerable class) were ordered in 1898 in response to increased naval construction for the Imperial Russian Navy. The design for the London class was prepared in 1898; it was a virtual repeat of the preceding Formidable class, though with significant revision to the forward armour protection scheme. Rather than a traditional transverse bulkhead for the forward end of the main belt armour, the belt was carried further forward and gradually tapered in thickness. Deck armour was also strengthened.

Bulwark was 431 feet 9 inches (131.6 m) long overall, with a beam of 75 feet (22.9 m) and a draught of 28 feet 2 inches (8.59 m) at deep load. She displaced 15,366 long tons (15,613 t) normally and up to 15,955 long tons (16,211 t) fully loaded. The ship had a metacentric height of 4.46 feet (1.36 m). Her crew numbered 738 officers and ratings as a private ship and up to 789 when serving as a flagship. The London-class ships were powered by a pair of three-cylinder inverted vertical triple-expansion steam engines. The cylinders were 31 1/2 inches (800 mm), 51 1/2 inches (1,310 mm) and 84 inches (2,100 mm) diameter with a stroke of 4 feet 3 inches (1.30 m). Each set drove one screw, using steam provided by twenty Belleville boilers. The boilers were trunked into two funnels located amidships. The London-class ships had a top speed of 18 knots (33 km/h; 21 mph) from 15,000 indicated horsepower (11,000 kW). During her sea trials, Bulwark reached 18.2 knots (33.7 km/h; 20.9 mph) from 15,353 ihp (11,449 kW). The ships carried enough coal to give them a range of 5,550 nautical miles (10,280 km; 6,390 mi) at a speed of 10 knots (19 km/h; 12 mph).

The main battery of the London class consisted of four BL 12-inch (305 mm) Mk IX guns mounted in twin-gun turrets, one each fore and aft of the superstructure. Their secondary armament consisted of a dozen BL 6-inch (152 mm) Mk VII guns mounted in casemates mounted in the sides of the hull. Defence against torpedo boats was provided by sixteen quick-firing (QF) 12-pounder (3 in, 76 mm) 12 cwt guns, (Note: "Cwt" is the abbreviation for hundredweight, 12 cwt referring to the weight of the gun.) eight of which were mounted in the central superstructure and the remaining eight guns were positioned on the main deck fore and aft and fired through unarmoured embrasures in the hull. Each of the two fighting tops were provided with three QF 3-pounder 47 mm (1.9 in) Hotchkiss guns. As was customary for battleships of the period, they were also equipped with four submerged 18-inch (450 mm) torpedo tubes in the hull, two on each broadside.

The Londons had an armoured belt that was 9 inches (229 mm) thick; the transverse bulkheads on the aft end of the belt were 9 to 12 in (229 to 305 mm) thick. Their main-gun turret faces were protected by armour plates 8 in (203 mm) thick, atop 12-inch barbettes, and the casemate guns were protected with 6 inches of Krupp steel. The conning tower had 14 in (356 mm) thick sides. The ships were fitted with three armoured decks, ranging in thickness between 1 and 2.5 in (25 and 64 mm) each.

== Construction and career ==
Bulwark, named for "the solid part of a ship's side extending above deck", was the fourth ship of her name to serve in the Royal Navy. The ship was one of the three battleships ordered as part of the 1898–1899 Naval Estimates. She was laid down at HM Dockyard, Devonport, on 20 March 1899 and launched on 18 October 1899 by Lady Fairfax, wife of Admiral Sir Henry Fairfax, Commander-in-Chief, Plymouth. The ship was completed in March 1902, at a cost of £997,846 plus £167,970 for her armament. Bulwark was commissioned by Captain Frederick Hamilton on 18 March for service with the Mediterranean Fleet. Admiral Sir Compton Domvile hoisted his flag on board on 1 May as Commander-in-Chief, Mediterranean Fleet.

=== 1902–1909 ===
She left Plymouth five days later, and arrived at Gibraltar on the 10th, then proceeded to Malta. In August, she was the flagship of a squadron visiting the Aegean Sea for combined manoeuvres and visits to Lemnos and Nauplia, and was slightly damaged during an exercise where the battleship Formidable misjudged the distance while attempting to tow Bulwark and collided with her. The following month, the annual manoeuvres with the Channel Fleet began off the coasts of Greece and Italy. She visited Cagliari, Sardinia, in October during the exercise. In late December 1902 she was back in Greek waters when she visited Astakos in the Ionian Sea with HMS Irresistible and HMS Pioneer. On 18 April 1903, King Edward VII was hosted aboard Bulwark and he reviewed the fleet two days later. During the fleet manoeuvres in August off the coast of Portugal, the ship was visited by King Carlos I of Portugal. During Kaiser Wilhelm II's visit to Malta in April 1904, he assumed temporary command of Bulwark on 11 April as an honorary British Admiral of the Fleet. Domville and Bulwark sometimes served as observers during the manoeuvres with the Channel Fleet in May 1905, rather than participating in them. The Mediterranean Fleet was recalled to Malta from the Adriatic Sea on 27 October after the Dogger Bank Incident where the Russian Baltic Fleet mistakenly fired upon British fishermen as it passed through the North Sea en route to the Far East during the Russo-Japanese War. The fleet arrived on the 29th and began loading coal and ammunition in preparation for war, but stood down on 2 November after the Russians agreed to investigate the incident. On 10 December, Bulwark was ordered back to England for her crew to be paid off and Domville hauled his flag down three days later. The ship departed Malta on 14 December, arrived at Devonport on 21 December and was paid off two days later.

Bulwark was recommissioned on 3 January 1905 with Commander Edward Philpotts as the acting flag captain and departed on 5 January for Malta where she arrived on the 12th where Domville rehoisted his flag. On 9 June, the ship arrived at Genoa, Italy, where Domville hauled his flag down again and Captain Osmond Brock relieved Philpotts. Two days later, she arrived in Malta where Admiral Lord Charles Beresford hoisted his flag aboard as Commander-in-Chief of the Mediterranean Fleet. Bulwark began a lengthy refit at Malta on 30 October that lasted until 5 February 1906; the work included the addition of spotting tops equipped with 4-foot-6-inch (1.37 m) Barr & Stroud coincidence rangefinders. On 10 February, the ship departed for Lagos, Portugal, to rendezvous with the Channel and Atlantic Fleets for manoeuvres that lasted the rest of the month. The annual manoeuvres that began on 24 June were designed to evaluate the effectiveness of a strategy of commerce raiding as Bulwark was the flagship of the fleet blockading Lagos before the general fleet action began three days later. In 1906–1907, all the main-deck 12-pounders were repositioned on the superstructure.

On 19 January 1907, she departed Malta for Portsmouth to be paid off; after arriving on 26 January, Beresford hauled down his flag, although the ship was not paid off until 11 February at Devonport. On 12 February, Bulwark was recommissioned under the command of Captain Bertram Chambers to serve as the flagship of Rear-Admiral Frank Finnis of the Nore Division, Home Fleet. The ship visited Trondheim, Norway, on 18 June and then Invergordon, Scotland, on the 26th. She was present during the fleet review conducted by King Edward at Cowes on 3 August. After participating in the fleet manoeuvres earlier in October, Bulwark ran aground twice near Lemon Light in the North Sea while trying to avoid Dutch fishing ships on 26 October, but was able to get herself free both times. Her bottom was slightly damaged during the incidents and she entered drydock at HM Dockyard, Chatham on 31 October to begin repairs and a lengthy refit that lasted until 9 March 1908. While still in dockyard hands, Captain Arthur Leveson temporarily assumed command on 3 January and Rear-Admiral Stanley Colville relieved Finnis in command of the Nore Division on 17 January. After conducting torpedo and gunnery training and trials over the preceding months, Captain Robert Falcon Scott of Antarctic fame was appointed captain of Bulwark on 18 May. On 1 August, the ship put into Sheerness Dockyard to pay off the crew, some of whom joined the battleships Duncan and Magnificent when she was formally decommissioned on 17 August. Bulwark was recommissioned the following day with a nucleus crew from the battleship Majestic. She was transferred to the Channel Fleet on 3 October and arrived at Plymouth Sound on 11 December. Ten days later, Devonport Dockyard began repairs to the ship's 12-inch turrets and replacement of the worn-out gun barrels that took until 3 March 1909 to complete. That same day, Captain Bentinck Yelverton assumed command of the battleship. Under the fleet reorganisation of 24 March 1909, the Channel Fleet became the 2nd Division of the Home Fleet. Bulwark was present at the fleet review at Spithead conducted for the Lords of the Admiralty on 12 June.

=== 1909–1914 ===
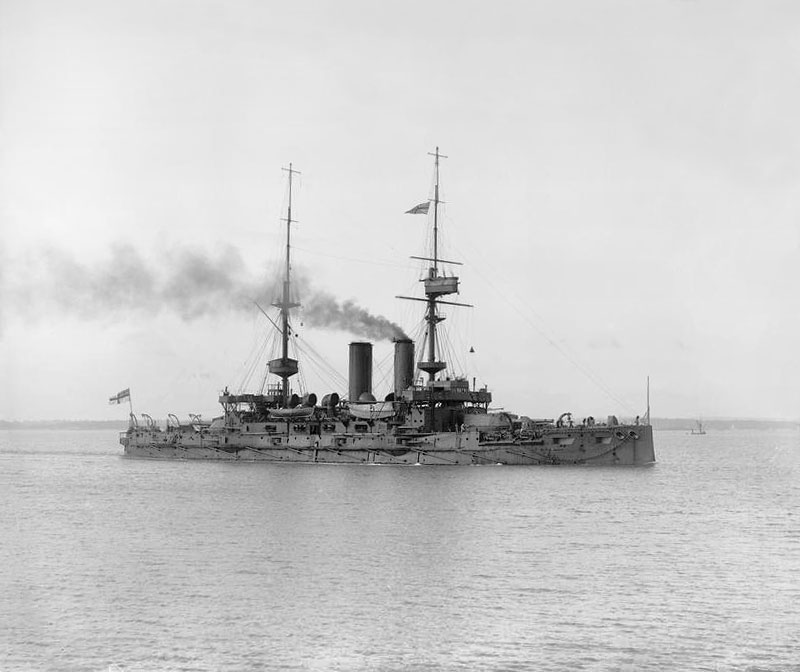
Bulwark in 1912

She was refitted at Devonport from 25 August to 17 December and was paid off on 28 February 1910. The following day Bulwark recommissioned into the reserve at Devonport with a nucleus crew as the flagship of Vice-Admiral George Neville, Vice-Admiral of the 3rd and 4th Divisions, Home Fleet, at the Nore, with Captain Cunningham Foot in temporary command. He was relieved by Captain George Hope on 18 March. Bulwark participated in the annual manoeuvres in July and she began a brief refit on 30 December that was completed on 25 February 1911. Captain Edmund Hyde Smith relieved Hope on 24 March and Vice-Admiral Prince Louis of Battenberg assumed command of the 3rd and 4th Divisions. Bulwark was paid off on 25 April, and Prince Louis hauled his flag down that same day. She was recommissioned as a private ship the next day with a nucleus crew. The ship was present during the Coronation Fleet Review of King George V at Spithead on 24 June. Bulwark arrived at Chatham on 23 July to unload her ammunition and stores in preparation for an extensive refit that began on 1 September and lasted until 1 May 1912.

By this time, a pair of the 3-pounders had been repositioned on the bridge and the others had been removed. While conducting sea trials, the ship grounded twice on Barrow Deep off the Nore during refit trials on 4 May 1912, extensively damaging her bottom. Repairs were not completed until the end of the month. On 4 June Captain Herbert Chatterton recommissioned Bulwark which was assigned to the 5th Battle Squadron (BS) of the Second Fleet. She briefly served as the flagship for the second-in-command of the squadron from 20 August until September, when his own ship returned. Aside from occasional gunnery practice, the ship was very inactive for the rest of the year; for example, she did not leave Spithead from 18 November 1912 to 25 February 1913. Bulwark was refitted at Portsmouth from 14 April – 4 June. The ship participated in the annual fleet manoeuvres in August and returned to Spithead on 30 October where she remained for the rest of the year. Captain Guy Sclater relieved Hyde Smith on 17 November.

Bulwark was visited by King Christian X of Denmark when he inspected the squadron on 9 May 1914. On 22 May, she began her annual refit at Chatham which was completed on 9 July. The following day she was alerted to prepare for a test mobilisation in lieu of the annual fleet manoeuvres as part of the British response to the July Crisis. The mobilisation was ordered on 15 July, and the fleet was reviewed two days later at Spithead after which it conducted exercises.

=== First World War ===
At the beginning of the First World War, Bulwark and the 5th BS were based at Portland and assigned to the newly reformed Channel Fleet to defend the English Channel. After covering the safe transportation of the British Expeditionary Force to France in August, the 5th BS remained in Portsmouth until 4 September when they returned to Portland. They stayed there through October aside from exercises. From 5 to 9 November, Bulwark hosted the court martial of Rear-Admiral Ernest Troubridge for his actions during the pursuit of the German battlecruiser SMS Goeben and light cruiser SMS Breslau in the Mediterranean Sea in August. On 14 November, the 5th BS was transferred to Sheerness because of concern that a German invasion of Great Britain was in the offing.

==== Explosion ====
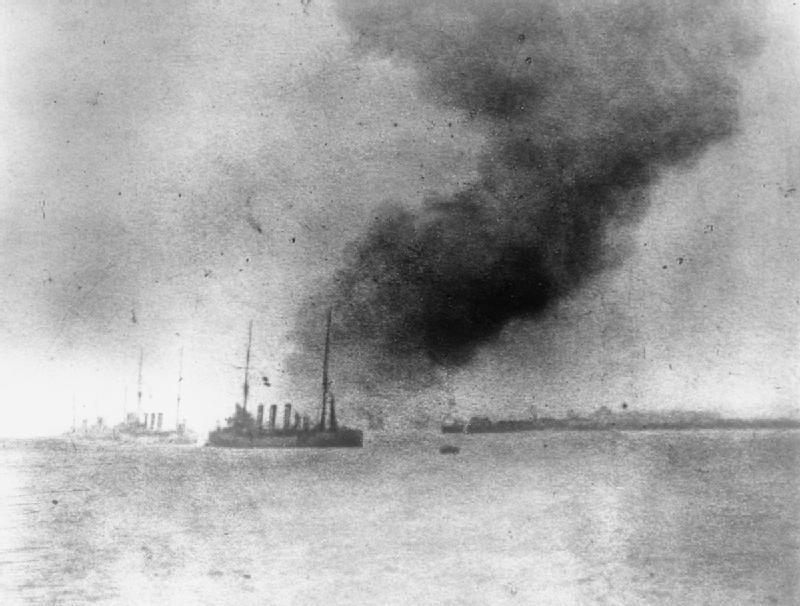
Bulwark explodes at Sheerness, 26 November 1914

A powerful internal explosion ripped Bulwark apart at about 07:53 on 26 November 1914 while she was moored at Number 17 buoy in Kethole Reach, (Note: This is not the current No 17 navigation buoy which is further upstream in Long Reach.) 4 nautical miles (7.4 km; 4.6 mi) west of Sheerness in the estuary of the River Medway. All the ship's officers were killed in the explosion and only a dozen ratings survived. A total of 741 men were lost, including members of the band of the gunnery school, HMS Excellent, which was playing aboard. Only about 30 bodies were recovered immediately after the explosion. In terms of loss of life, the incident remains the second most catastrophic accidental explosion in the history of the United Kingdom, exceeded only by the explosion of the dreadnought battleship Vanguard, caused by a stokehold fire detonating a magazine, at Scapa Flow in 1917.

A naval court of enquiry into the causes of the explosion that was held on 28 November ruled out external explosions such as a torpedo or a mine because eyewitnesses spoke of a flash of flame near the aft turret and then one or two explosions quickly following, not the towering column of water associated with explosions against the outer hull. The gunnery logbook, recovered partially intact, and the testimony of the chief gunner's clerk, as well as several other survivors, said the six-inch ammunition magazines were being restowed to keep the cordite propellant charges together in lots that morning. This meant at least 30 exposed charges had been left in the cross-passages between the ship's magazines with the magazine doors left open when the ship's company was called to breakfast at 07:45. These passages were also used to stow hundreds of six-inch and twelve-pounder shells, and the court concluded that the cordite charges had been stowed against one of the boiler-room bulkheads which was increasing in temperature as the boilers were fired up. This ignited the cordite charges which detonated the nearby shells and spread to the aft twelve-inch magazine, which exploded.

== Wreck site ==
On 29 November divers sent to find the wreck reported that the ship's port bow as far aft as the sick bay had been blown off by the explosion and lay 50 ft (15 m) east of the mooring. The starboard bow lay 30 ft (9 m) further away. The remainder of the ship had been torn apart so violently that no other large portions of the wreck could be found. One 12-inch gun was located on 28 December, a considerable distance away from her mooring, and later recovered.

The wreck is marked by the "East Bulwark" and "West Bulwark" buoys. (Note: East Bulwark is a lit green cone (starboard marker). The main channel is Kethole reach and this buoy marks it. West Bulwark is an unlit red can (port marker) which marks the inshore channel. The buoys are not "reversed out of respect" as is sometimes said locally, there are two channels.) It was designated as a controlled site in 2008 due to it being military remains and cannot be dived upon except with permission from the Ministry of Defence.

== Memorials ==
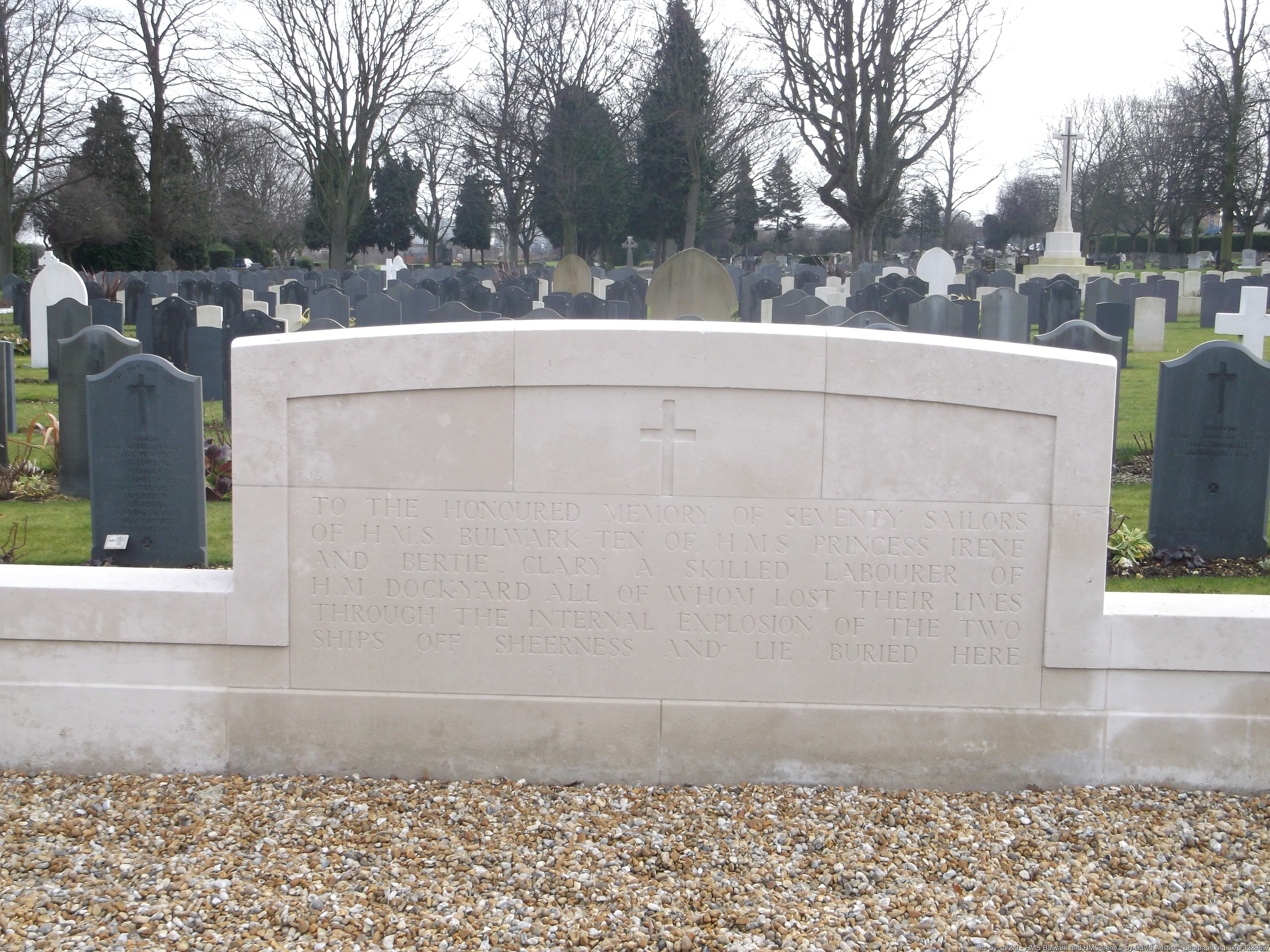
The HMS Bulwark and HMS Irene War Memorial

A memorial to those lost on Bulwark and the minelayer Princess Irene (also lost in an accidental explosion) was erected at the Dockyard Church, Sheerness, in 1921. It was dedicated by Archdeacon Charles Ingles, the Chaplain of the Fleet, and unveiled by Admiral Hugh Evan-Thomas, Commander-in-Chief, The Nore. Victims of both ships are also commemorated on the Naval War Memorial at Southsea. Another memorial was placed in Woodlands Road Cemetery, Gillingham, Kent, as part of the Naval Burial Ground.
