= Privett =

Village in Hampshire, England

Coordinates: 51.038°N 1.037°W

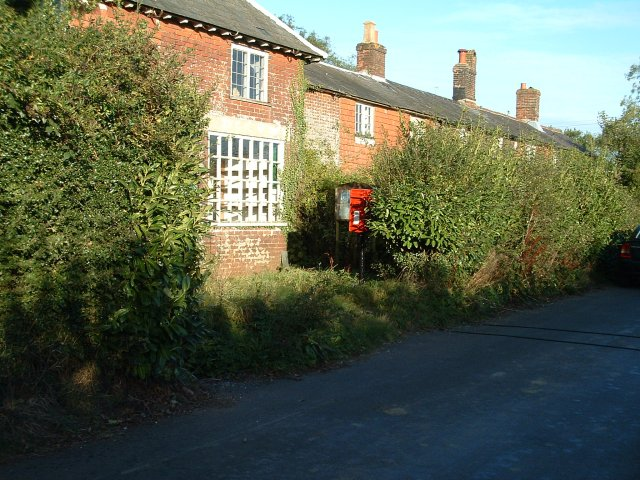
- Privett Old Post Office

- Location within Hampshire
- OS grid reference: SU675269
- Civil parish: Froxfield and Privett
- District: East Hampshire
- Shire county: Hampshire
- Region: South East
- Country: England
- Sovereign state: United Kingdom
- Post town: Petersfield
- Postcode district: GU32
- Police: Hampshire and Isle of Wight
- Fire: Hampshire and Isle of Wight
- Ambulance: South Central
- UK Parliament: East Hampshire

Privett is a small village and former civil parish, now in the parish of Froxfield and Privett, in the East Hampshire district of Hampshire, England. It is 5 miles (8.0 km) northwest of Petersfield, just off the A272 road. Its principal feature is Holy Trinity Church, designed by Arthur Blomfield and built at the expense of local landowner, businessman and M.P. William Nicholson. Nicholson was also responsible for building in the village a number of dwellings for workers on his Basing Park estate. In 1931 the parish had a population of 172.

== History ==
A place called Pryfetesflōd (Privett's River), located in the Weald, is mentioned in the 755 AD entry of the Anglo-Saxon Chronicle (the story of Cynewulf and Cyneheard), as the place where Sigeberht of Wessex, previously a ruler of Hampshire, was driven off to.

The village was known as Pryvet in the 14th century and Pryvate in the 16th century. The parish of Holy Trinity is listed as being part of the parish and manor of West Meon in 1391, belonging to St. Swithun's Monastery, later granted to the Dean and Chapter of Winchester by Henry VIII.

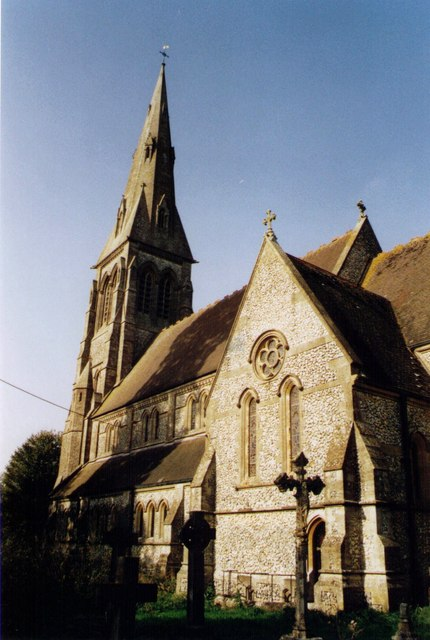
Holy Trinity Church

Holy Trinity Church was completed in 1878 on the site of an earlier building. Designated as Grade II* listed in 1978, the building is oversized for the rural community and was declared redundant in 1975. It is now in the care of the Churches Conservation Trust.

The Meon Valley Railway, a cross-country line from Alton towards the south coast which was opened in 1903, passed through a 1,056-yard (966 m) tunnel just north-west of the village. Privett station was further north, where the line passed under the A32. The station was closed in 1955 when passenger services on the line were withdrawn, and the line was dismantled soon after.

The village was designated as a conservation area in 2000.

== Governance ==
The village of Privett is part of the Froxfield and Steep ward of the East Hampshire District Council, which is a non-metropolitan district council of Hampshire County Council. On 1 April 1932 the parish was abolished and merged with Froxfield.

== Transport ==
The nearest railway station is Petersfield, 5 miles (8 km) south-east of the village. Hampshire Bus provide a daily service to and from Alton College on school days.
