= John Nicholson (Cambridge University cricketer) =

English cricketer

John Nicholson (18 February 1822 – 10 December 1861) was an English cricketer who played in three first-class cricket matches for Cambridge University in 1845. He was born in Clapton, London and died at Tillingbourne, Dorking, Surrey.

Nicholson was educated at Rugby School and at Harrow School and was at Trinity College, Cambridge from 1842 to his graduation in 1846. He appeared for the university in two cricket matches against the Marylebone Cricket Club and then in a low-scoring University Match which was won by Cambridge.

John Nicholson was followed at Cambridge by his younger brother, William, who became a better-known cricketer (though not playing for the university team) and, through the family firm of J&W Nicholson & Co, the gin distiller, a significant benefactor to Lord's and the MCC, which adopted the company colours.
