= Godfrey Bolles Lee =

English cricketer

The Reverend Godfrey Bolles Lee
- Born: Godfrey Bolles Lee; 19 March 1817
- Died: 29 January 1903 (aged 86)
- Education: New College, Oxford
- Spouse: Emma Nunez Crawford
- Children: 5
- Father: Robert Newton Lee
- Relatives: Elinor Frances Vallentin (great-niece)

Godfrey Bolles Lee (19 March 1817 – 29 January 1903) was an English amateur cricketer who played from 1837 to 1845. Mainly associated with Oxford University and Hampshire, he made 8 known appearances.

== Early life ==
Godfrey Bolles Lee was born on 19 March 1817. He was the son of Robert Newton Lee of Coldrey [House], a magistrate and deputy lieutenant of Hampshire.

== Career ==
Lee spent most of his life at Winchester College, where he was educated. He was a tutor at Winchester from his graduation from New College, Oxford, in 1839 through to 1860, then bursar at New College for a year. He was a fellow of New College 1835–61. He then returned to Winchester as Warden from 1861 until his death in 1903. He was ordained as a Church of England priest in 1846.

== Personal life ==
Lee was married to Emma Nunez Crawford, together they had 5 children:

1. Arthur Crawford Lee
2. Agnes Harriet Lee
3. Edith F. Lee
4. Georgiana Emma Mary Lee
5. Helen Margaret Lee

Lee took his nephew William Wickham Bertrand under his care during Bertrand's education in England. Bertrand was the father of Elinor Frances Vallentin.

Lee died on 29 January 1903.

== Bibliography ==
- Haygarth, Arthur (1996) [1862]. Scores & Biographies, Volume 1 (1744–1826). Kennington: Frederick Lillywhite. ISBN 978-19-00592-23-9.
- Haygarth, Arthur (1997) [1862]. Scores & Biographies, Volume 2 (1827–1840). Kennington: Frederick Lillywhite. ISBN 978-19-00592-23-9.
