= William Sydney Hylton Jolliffe =

English politician

William Sydney Hylton Jolliffe (27 September 1841 – 19 January 1912) was an English Conservative Party politician.

Jolliffe was educated at Eton. He served in the Scots Guards and the North Somerset Yeomanry. He was the Member of Parliament for Petersfield from 1874 to 1880. He resided at 17 Lowndes Square when Parliament was siting and Heath House, Petersfield when it was in recess.

Parliament of the United Kingdom
Preceded by William Nicholson	Member of Parliament for Petersfield; 1874 – 1880	Succeeded by William Nicholson
