= Bailey Green =

Hamlet in Hampshire, England

Coordinates: 51.043°N 01.046°W

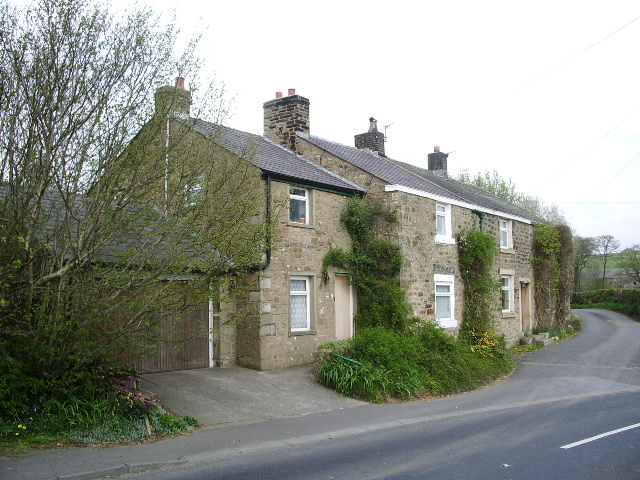
- Cottages in Bailey Green

- Location within Hampshire
- OS grid reference: SU670275
- Civil parish: Froxfield and Privett
- District: East Hampshire
- Shire county: Hampshire
- Region: South East
- Country: England
- Sovereign state: United Kingdom
- Post town: Petersfield
- Postcode district: GU34
- Police: Hampshire and Isle of Wight
- Fire: Hampshire and Isle of Wight
- Ambulance: South Central
- UK Parliament: East Hampshire

Bailey Green is a hamlet in Hampshire, England. It lies in Froxfield and Privett parish within the East Hampshire district, about 5.5 miles (9 km) north-west of Petersfield.
