= Arthur Grove =

Arthur Stanley Grove FLS VMH (July 22, 1864 – February 2, 1942, Richmond, Surrey) was a British botanist and expert on the genus Lilium and a writer on gardening and horticulture for the popular press.

Grove was the youngest child of the three sons and two daughters of Sir George Grove and Harriet, Lady Grove. Grove's godparents were Arthur Penrhyn Stanley, Arthur Sullivan, and Olga Elizabeth von Glehn (1839–1918), a sister of the talented pianist Marie Emilie "Mimi" von Glehn (1842–1886). Arthur Grove was trained an engineer, but soon became an enthusiastic amateur gardener. At his garden near Henley-on-Thames, he cultivated a remarkable collection of plants. He made a life-long study of lilies, maintained a wide interest in gardening, and for many years was the chief horticultural contributor to The Times.

== A Supplement to Elwes' Monograph of the Genus Lilium ==
From March 1877 to May 1880, Taylor & Francis published in seven parts the classic Monograph of the Genus Lilium, written by Henry John Elwes (with some assistance from John Gilbert Baker) and illustrated by Walter Hood Fitch. In 1922, Elwes, elderly and in declining health, asked his friend Arthur Grove to produce a comprehensive supplement. Dame Alice Godman, widow of Frederick DuCane Godman, agreed to underwrite the cost of the work. (Frederick Godman's first wife was Elwes' sister Edith, who died soon after giving birth to her first child — the child died soon after birth.) Dulau & Company published the supplement (co-written by Grove and the botanist A.D. Cotton). The first seven parts of the supplement were published between July 1933 and February 1940, with 30 hand-coloured lithographed plates, all except two by Lilian Snelling (1879–1972).

== Awards and honours ==
In January 1903 Arthur Grove was elected a Fellow of the Linnean Society of London. The Royal Horticultural Society (RHS) awarded him in 1924 the Victoria Medal of Honour and in 1933 the Veitch Memorial Medal. In 1935 he received a Gold Medal from the Massachusetts Horticultural Society. He was also the first recipient of the Lyttel Lily Cup, awarded annually by the RHS Council on the recommendation of the RHS's Lily Committee.

== Selected publications ==
- Grove, Arthur (1910). Lilies: with eight coloured plates. T.C. and E.C. Jack.
- Grove, Arthur; Waltham, T. (1920). Lilies.
- Grove, Arthur (1927). "Rhododendrons and lime". Gardeners' Chronicle. 26: 426–428.
- Grove, Arthur (1930). "Seminal propagation of lilies". Gardeners' Chronicle. 3 (87): 86.
- Grove, Arthur (1931). "The diseases of lilies". Gardeners' Chronicle. 89 (2302).
- Grove, Arthur (1931). "Soil heating by electricity". Gardeners' Chronicle. 89: 336–337.
