= William Graham Nicholson =

British politician (1862–1942)

The Right Honourable William Graham Nicholson JP DL
- Nicholson

Member of Parliament for Petersfield
- In office 1897–1935
- Preceded by: William Wickham
- Succeeded by: Sir Reginald Dorman-Smith

Personal details
- Born: 11 March 1862 Hampshire, England
- Died: 29 July 1942 (aged 80)
- Party: Liberal Unionist
- Spouse: Alice Margaret Beach (after 1890)
- Parent(s): William Nicholson; Isabella Sarah Meek
- Relatives: John Sanctuary Nicholson (brother)
- Education: Harrow School
- Alma mater: Trinity College, Cambridge

William Graham Nicholson, PC JP DL (11 March 1862 – 29 July 1942) was a British Liberal Unionist and later Conservative Party politician.

== Early life ==
Nicholson was born on 11 March 1862 and grew up in Basing Park at Froxfield, which later became his seat. He was born into a famous family of distillers, the son of William Nicholson and brother of John Sanctuary Nicholson, a notable military figure in Imperial Africa. Through his brother, Richard Francis Harrison, he was uncle to Sir Godfrey Nicholson, 1st Baronet.

He was educated at Harrow School and at Trinity College, Cambridge.

== Career ==
Nicholson served as Director-General on Mobilisation in the Second Anglo-Boer War from 30 June 1901 and was promoted an Honorary Colonel commanding the 3rd Battalion of the Hampshire Regiment.

After the death of the Conservative MP William Wickham, he was elected at a by-election in June 1897 as the Liberal Unionist Member of Parliament (MP) for Petersfield in Hampshire, a seat which had previously been held by his father. Nicholson sat as a Conservative after the Liberal Unionists and Conservatives merged in 1912, and held the seat until his retirement at the 1935 general election.

He was appointed a Privy Counsellor in the 1925 Birthday Honours. He was an alderman of Hampshire County Council, a Justice of the Peace, and a Deputy Lieutenant of Hampshire.

In his spare time he was a keen horticulturalist.

== Personal life ==
In 1890 he married Alice Margaret "Sissy" Beach, daughter of William Wither Bramston Beach MP. Together, they were the parents of:

- Otho William Nicholson (1891–1978), who married Elisabeth Bramwell, a daughter of Frederick C. Bramwell, in 1927.
- Lt.-Col. John Humphrey Nicholson (b. 1893), who married Elizabeth Anne Floyd, a daughter of Sir Henry Floyd, 4th Baronet and Edith Anne Kincaid-Smith, in 1929.

He resided under a lease for some time at Bentworth Hall, although Basing Park was his main residence.

Parliament of the United Kingdom
Preceded by William Wickham	Member of Parliament for Petersfield; 1897 – 1935	Succeeded by Sir Reginald Dorman-Smith
