= Arthur Disbrowe Cotton =

English botanist and mycologist (1879–1962)

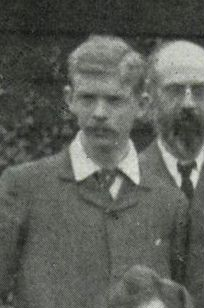
A.D. Cotton, 1905

Arthur Disbrowe Cotton, OBE VMH FLS (15 January 1879 – 27 December 1962) was an English plant pathologist, mycologist, phycologist, and botanist. The standard author abbreviation Cotton is used to indicate this person as the author when citing a botanical name.

A.D. Cotton was born in London and educated at King's College School and the Royal College of Science, where he completed a degree in botany in 1901. He became a demonstrator there and subsequently at Owens College, Manchester, where he developed an interest in fungi, undertaking research into orchid mycorrhizas.

In 1904 he was appointed assistant to George Massee, head of mycology and cryptogamic plants at the Royal Botanic Gardens, Kew. Cotton remained at Kew till 1915, officially working on algae, but also making time to pursue his particular interest in clavarioid fungi.

During this time Cotton collaborated with Elinor Francis Vallentin. Vallentine supplied Cotton with numerous specimens enabling him to undertake the first comprehensive study of Cryptogams from the Falkland Islands.

In 1915 he took charge of a newly established Plant Pathology Laboratory at Kew (later moved to the Rothamsted Experimental Station) and in 1920 became Mycologist to the Board of Agriculture. In 1922, he returned to Kew to become Keeper of the Herbarium, a post he retained till his retirement in 1946.

A.D. Cotton was President of the British Mycological Society in 1913 and President of the Linnean Society of London between 1943 and 1946. He received an OBE for services to plant pathology in 1934. The Royal Horticultural Society awarded him the Veitch Memorial Medal in 1935 and the Victoria Medal of Honour in 1943.

During his career he published a number of papers on plant pathology, fungi, and algae, as well as co-authoring, with Arthur Grove, the first seven parts of the supplement to Elwes' Monograph of the genus Lilium. He also described several new taxa of fungi and algae. The marine algal genus Cottoniella Boergesen and the species Fucus cottonii M.J. Wynne & Magne were named after him.

He had married botanist Enid Mary, daughter of John Charles Jesson, in 1913. They had a son and a daughter.

== Sample Publications ==
- Cotton, A.D. (1906). Marine algae from Corea. Kew bulletin of miscellaneous information 1906: 366-373
- Cotton, A.D. (1907). Marine algae from the Chatham Islands. Kew bulletin of miscellaneous information 1907: 37-43.
- Cotton, A.D. (1907). Notes on British Clavariae. Transactions of the British Mycological Society 2: 163-166
- Cotton, A.D. (1909). Notes on marine pyrenomycetes. Transactions of the British Mycological Society 3: 92-99, 1 plate.
- Cotton, A.D. (1912). Clare Island Survey. Marine algae. Proceedings of the Royal Irish Academy 31B(15): 1-178, 11 tables.
- Cotton, A.D. (1914). Some suggestions as to the study and critical revision of certain genera of the Agaricaceae. Trans. Brit. Mycol. Soc. 4: 224-235
- Cotton, A.D. (1915). Cryptogams from the Falkland Islands collected by Mrs Vallentin. Journal of the Linnean Society Botany 43: 137-231, tabs 4-10
- Cotton, A.D. & Wakefield, E.M. (1919). A revision of the British Clavariae. Transactions of the British Mycological Society 6: 164-198
- Grove, A. & Cotton, A.D. (1933–40) Supplement to Elwes' Monograph of the genus Lilium, Parts 1-7. London
- Cotton, A.D. (1936). Marine algae. Proceedings of the Linnean Society of London 148: 45-49.
