= Bertram Chambers =

Royal Navy Admiral (1866–1945)

Admiral Bertram Chambers CB
- Born: 3 October 1866
- Died: 27 April 1945 (aged 78)
- Spouse: Nora Bertrand (m. 1901)
- Children: 2, including Marcus
- Relatives: Erika Chambers (granddaughter)
- Military career
- Branch: Royal Navy
- Awards: Companion of the Order of the Bath

Admiral Bertram Mordaunt Chambers CB (3 October 1866 – 27 April 1945) was a Royal Navy officer who served in Australia and Canada.

== Life and career ==
=== Early life and career ===
Born in London, Chambers was the son of Lucibella (née Hare) and barrister Charles Harcourt Chambers. His paternal grandfather was Sir Charles Harcourt Chambers, puisne judge of the Supreme Court of Bombay. Chambers was educated at Clifton College and Stubbington House School, before entering HMS Britannia as a cadet in 1879, placing twenty-seventh out of thirty-seven successful candidates. Passing out of Britannia in 1881, Chambers was appointed to HMS Monarch in which, as a midshipman, he was present at the bombardment of Alexandria in 1882. In 1883 he was appointed to HMS Satellite, remaining in her until 1886.

Promoted to lieutenant in 1889, Chambers was awarded the Shadwell Testimonial for naval surveying in 1894 and 1895. He was promoted to the rank of commander in 1900 and captain in 1905. He then attended a signals course and a war course in Portsmouth, finishing in 1906. He became flag captain of the battleship HMS Bulwark in 1907, the flagship of Rear-Admiral Frank Finnis of the Nore Division, Home Fleet. He was also in command of HMS Resolution for much of the period. In 1908 he was given command of the second class protected cruiser HMS Talbot. In 1910 he took up command of the battleship HMS Majestic.

=== Australian service ===
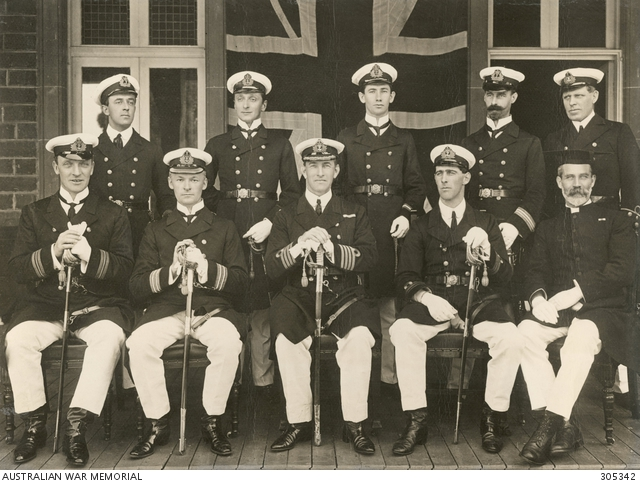
Official opening of the Royal Australian Naval College, 1913. Chambers is at the centre of the front row.

In 1911, he was loaned to the Australian government, becoming a member of the first Australian Commonwealth Naval Board, of which he was Second Naval Member. He also was involved in the establishment of the Royal Australian Naval College, of which he was the first head.

=== First World War and service in Canada ===
Returning to England, Chambers took command of HMS Illustrious from August to October 1914, then took command of HMS Roxburgh until April 1915. From 1915 to 1917, he was Admiralty Port Officer, Scapa, concurrently commanding HMS Imperieuse. He was promoted to rear-admiral on 27 April 1917 and retired the following day at his own request.

In July 1917, he was appointed Port Convoy Officer and Senior Naval Officer, Escorts, Halifax, arriving the following month. The Admiralty had initially proposed that Chambers should be titled "Senior Naval Officer Afloat, Halifax". The Royal Canadian Navy objected to the idea of giving such a title to a British officer under the command of the Admiralty, and transferred Vice-Admiral William Oswald Story, who outranked him, to Halifax. In December 1917, Chambers was among the senior officers who dealt with the aftermath of the Halifax Explosion. In 1918, he and his staff were transferred to Quebec City.

He was appointed a Companion of the Order of the Bath in 1919 "For valuable services as Port Convoy Officer, Halifax, Nova Scotia".

=== Later life ===
Chambers was promoted to vice-admiral on the Retired List in 1922 and admiral on the Retired List in 1926. He was a member of the Metropolitan Asylums Board in 1921, as well as a Younger Brother of Trinity House. He published his memoirs, Salt Junk, in 1927. He died at Moreton Hampstead, Devon, in 1945.

== Family ==
In 1901, Chambers married Nora Bertrand, Daughter of William Wickham Bertrand of Roy Cove, Falkland Islands, and sister of botanist Elinor Frances Vallentin. Together they had a son; motor racing manager Marcus Mordaunt Bertrand Chambers, and a daughter.
