= Froxfield Green =

Village and parish in Hampshire, England

Coordinates: 51.025°N 0.998°W

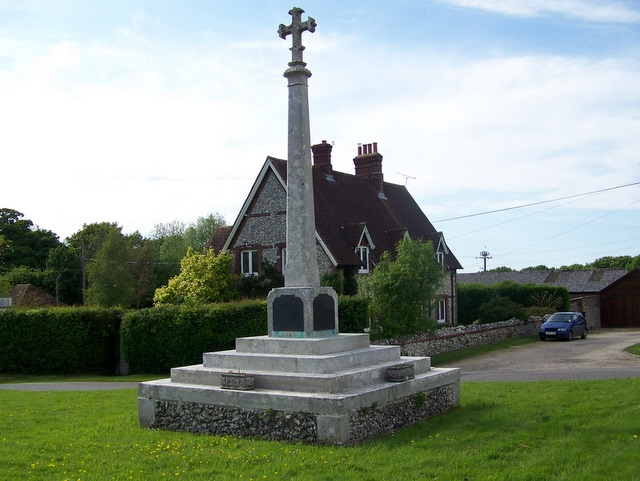
- War Memorial, Froxfield Green, erected 1921

- Location within Hampshire
- OS grid reference: SU703256
- Civil parish: Froxfield and Privett
- District: East Hampshire
- Shire county: Hampshire
- Region: South East
- Country: England
- Sovereign state: United Kingdom
- Post town: Petersfield
- Postcode district: GU32
- Dialling code: 01730
- Police: Hampshire and Isle of Wight
- Fire: Hampshire and Isle of Wight
- Ambulance: South Central
- UK Parliament: East Hampshire

Froxfield Green (formerly Froxfield) is a village in the civil parish of Froxfield and Privett, in the East Hampshire district of Hampshire, England. It is 3 miles (5 km) north-west of Petersfield, and lies just north of the A272 road.

== History ==
Earthworks which run north–south and pass along the western edge of the modern village may be an Anglo-Saxon defensive work, or mark a tribal boundary. The remains of a Roman and Romano-British site lie a short distance south-east of the village.

Froxfield is not mentioned in the 1086 Domesday Book; the area is probably included land at Menes which later became the large East Meon estate.

Although the settlement was documented as Froxfield Green in 1908, Ordnance Survey maps published in 1939 and earlier identified it as Froxfield. Since at least 1960, maps show Froxfield Green. The civil parish in which the village lies was called Froxfield until the 2010s, when the name Froxfield and Privett came into use.

On 1 April 1932 the parish of Privett was merged with Froxfield. On 9 May 2013 the merged parish was renamed from "Froxfield" to "Froxfield and Privett". In 1931 the parish of Froxfield (prior to the merge) had a population of 693.

== Amenities ==
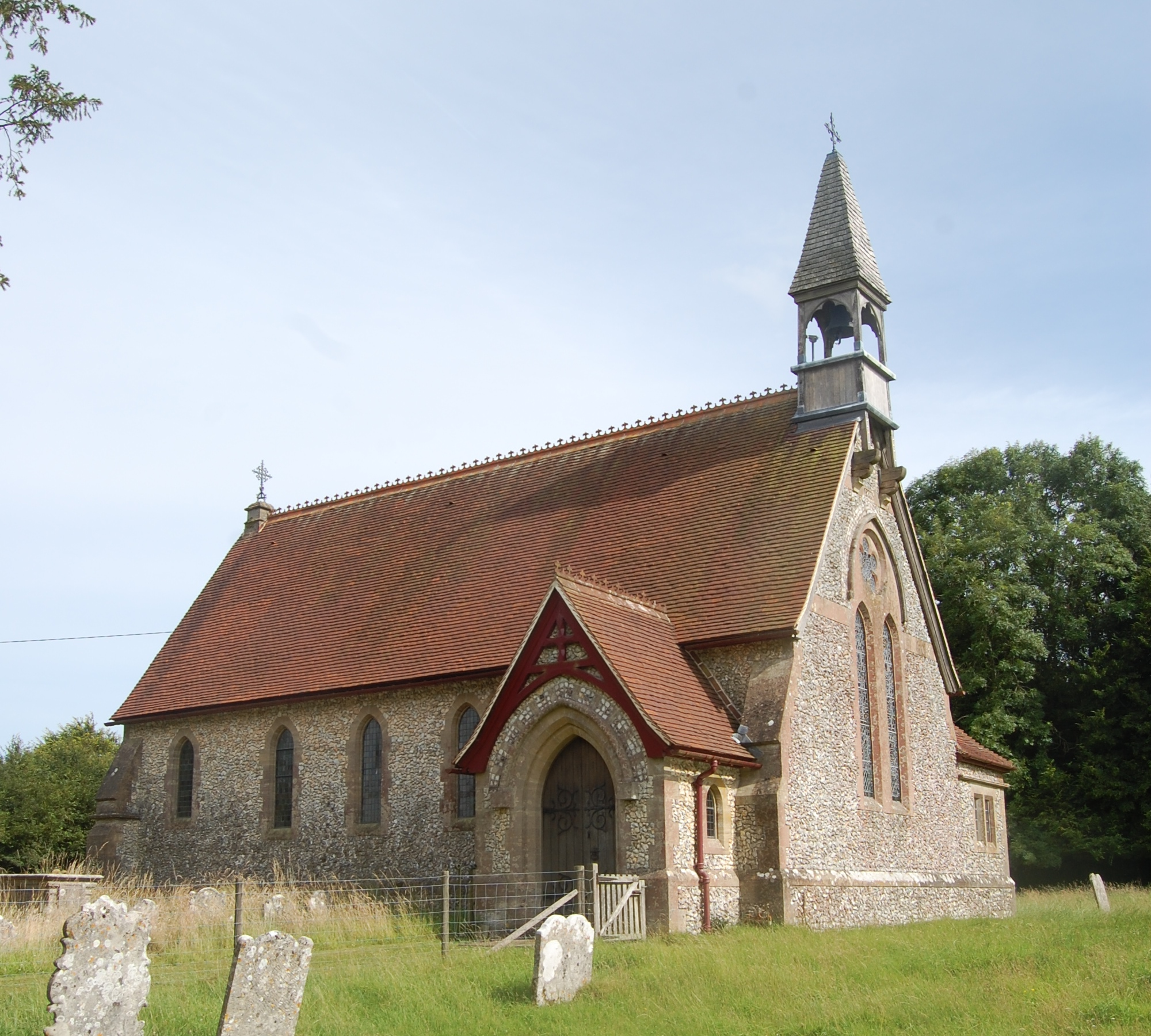
Church of St Peter-on-the-Green

The local primary school, Froxfield CE School, is almost a mile to the north-east at High Cross. The nearest railway station is at Petersfield.

The small church of St Peter-on-the-Green was built in 1886, replacing a Saxon church on the same site which had been demolished in 1861. In simple Early English style, it is built in flint rubble with stone dressings, and has a western bell-turret which houses a bell dated 1766. Today the church is part of the benefice of Steep and Froxfield with Privett, which also includes St Peter's church at High Cross (built in 1862, incorporating three Norman arches and columns from the old church at the Green).
