= William Wickham (civil servant) =

British civil servant and politician

The Right Honourable William Wickham
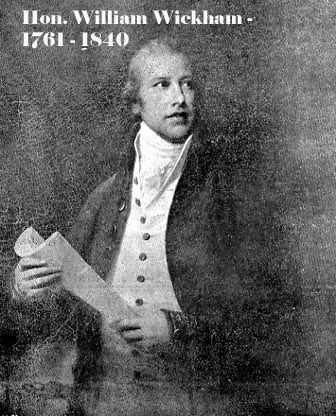
- Portrait of William Wickham

Under-Secretary of State for the Home Department
- In office 1798–1801
- Monarch: George III
- Prime Minister: William Pitt the Younger
- Preceded by: Charles Greville
- Succeeded by: Edward Finch Hatton

Chief Secretary for Ireland
- In office 1802–1804
- Monarch: George III
- Prime Minister: Henry Addington
- Preceded by: Charles Abbot
- Succeeded by: Sir Evan Nepean, Bt

Personal details
- Born: 11 November 1761 Cottingley
- Died: 22 October 1840 (aged 78)
- Children: Henry
- Education: Christ Church, Oxford

William Wickham PC PC (Ire) (11 November 1761 – 22 October 1840) was a British spymaster and a director of internal security services during the French Revolutionary Wars. He was credited with disrupting radical conspiracies in England but, appointed Chief Secretary for Ireland, failed in 1803 to anticipate a republican insurrection in Dublin. He ended his career in government service in 1804, resigning his post in Ireland where, privately, he denounced government policy as unjust and oppressive.

== Early years ==
Born into wealth in Cottingley, Yorkshire, England, he was the eldest son of Henry Wickham, Esq., of Cottingley, Lieutenant-Colonel in the 1st Regiment of Foot Guards, and a justice of the peace for the West Riding. His mother was Elizabeth, daughter of William Lamplugh, vicar of Cottingley. Wickham attended Harrow School and Christ Church, Oxford, where he was a protégé of Cyril Jackson. He took a law degree in Geneva, Switzerland in 1786. He was also called to the bar in England, at Lincoln's Inn.

In 1788 he married Eleonora Madeleine Bertrand (died 1836), whose father Louis Bertrand was professor of mathematics in the University of Geneva. They had one son, Henry Lewis Wickham (born 1789); Henry's son, William, was a member of parliament for Petersfield.

== Magistrate ==
From 1790 to 1794, Wickham was a commissioner of bankrupts. Following the passing of the Middlesex Justices Act 1792 (32 Geo. 3. c. 53), Wickham was appointed in 1793 as one of the new stipendiary magistrates. In this position he began to undertake secret work for the government, at the behest of Lord Grenville, the then Foreign Secretary. This was at a time when the French Revolution was causing great concern to the British political establishment, and powers were given to magistrates under the Aliens Act 1793.

An early action taken by Wickham in his new post was the infiltration of the radical London Corresponding Society, leading to the arrest and trial for treason of its leaders. Despite the apparent failure of his spies to uncover anything incriminating amidst the society's meetings and papers or to entrap the members in sedition, treason, or other crimes, Wickham was made "superintendent of aliens" in 1794 by the then Home Secretary, the Duke of Portland.

== Intelligence activities ==
Because of his knowledge of Switzerland, Grenville sent Wickham to that country in 1794 as assistant to the British ambassador. A year later he was named chargé d'affaires when the ambassador took extended leave, and then appointed ambassador in his own right. His unofficial duties were to liaise with French opponents of the Revolution. By 1795, England was openly combating the French revolutionaries who had usurped and beheaded King Louis XVI and Queen Marie Antoinette. Wickham established a spy network in Switzerland, southern Germany and in France and negotiated with French Royalists and others, supporting amongst other initiatives the disastrous rising in la Vendée.

Wickham strengthened the British intelligence system by emphasising the centrality of the intelligence cycle – query, collection, collation, analysis and dissemination – and the need for an all-source centre of intelligence. Even so, British intelligence would remain fragmented, partly because the threat of insurrection in Ireland (possibly with French support) remained a primary concern. This would remain the case until the creation of the modern British intelligence system in the early 1900s.

Nevertheless, the government secretly funded Wickham with a substantial budget for his activities, and he enjoyed considerable freedom with which to operate. A good deal of this was spent in a complex plot to bring French revolutionary general Charles Pichegru over to the ranks of Louis Joseph, Prince of Condé, who maintained an army on the Rhine. Wickham advanced £8,000 to feed and supply Pichegru's troops; however, Pichegru vacillated and the initiative failed. Wickham also reported on French troop positions, armaments and operations. French spies, however, learned of his network, and France pressured Swiss authorities to expel him.

Wickham resigned, returning to England in 1798, where he resumed, after some internal wrangling, his position as Superintendent of Aliens, and was appointed Under-Secretary of State for the Home Department. For a year and a half he was "the effective head of the secret service". In that capacity, in March 1798 he orchestrated the arrests in London of leading radicals in the London Corresponding Society and their United Irish contacts, among them James Coigly who was executed in June for treasonable communication with the French, and Edward Despard destined to follow Coigly to the gallows in 1802.

The following year, 1799, Wickham returned to Europe to Swabia, close to the Swiss border, in 1799 where his averred role was to liaise with Austrian and Russian commanders engaged in campaigns against the French army. Again he negotiated inconclusively with Pichegru, but his expensive intrigues were rendered useless by the French victory at the Battle of Marengo on 14 June 1800. Moreover, he was accused in London of misuse of public funds, which brought him close to a nervous breakdown. Wickham returned to London in 1801.

Sheryl Craig suggests that Wickham's notoriety in this period inspired Jane Austen to name the duplicitous villain of Pride and Prejudice, George Wickham, after him. Wickham advocated preventive policing: using networks of informers to uncover and frustrate seditious conspiracies before they reached fruition. However while he considered such undercover surveillance to be necessary in the national interest, he also believed that the security services should conduct in a manner appropriate to the circumstances. Thus, when peace appeared on the horizon in 1801 he proposed winding back of the wartime intelligence apparatus to a level "which a Free People jealous of its Liberties may be supposed fairly and rightly to entertain."

== Ireland ==
In 1802 Wickham was appointed to the Privy Council and named Chief Secretary for Ireland under Lord Hardwicke.

In July 1803, within days of Wickham having reassured the government in London that, in the wake of the Acts of Union, Ireland was at peace, an accidental explosion at a rebel arms depot in Dublin precipitated a disorderly rising led by Robert Emmet. Wickham was tasked with investigating the conspiracy and with the capture and interrogation of Emmet and his lieutenants.

Emmet was arrested in August, convicted of treason, and executed in September. Before leaving his prison cell for the last time, Emmet wrote to the Chief Secretary giving an account of motives and thanking him for the fair treatment he had received. It was a letter Wickham was later to refer to as his "constant companion".

In December, Wickham resigned. To a confidant he wrote: "I have been treated unkindly and unhandsomely by a government which I have served faithfully, zealously, and with great affection." At the same time, he told friends that "no consideration upon earth" could have induced him "to remain after having maturely reflected on the contents’ of Emmet's letter". Emmet had been attempting to save Ireland from "a state of depression and humiliation" and Wickham proposed that had he been an Irishman, he "should most unquestionably have joined him". (Wickham was also impressed by Emmet's lieutenant Nicholas Stafford, who had refused to incriminate his companions: he was, he reported, "the finest looking man" he ever saw).

On the eve of his resignation he gave John Petty, Earl Wycombe, written assurance that he was not under consideration for arrest. This was despite his spymaster, Francis Higgins, insisting that Wycombe had "entered deep into the virus" of Emmet's conspiracy".

On the formation of Grenville's ministry in 1806, Wickham was appointed a Lord of the Treasury, but he resigned again from his post the following year. He would not serve in an administration that refused Catholic Emancipation. Wickham never again held government office.

In 1802, he had entered the new United Kingdom Parliament as MP for the Irish borough constituency of Cashel, serving until 1806. Wickham then sat for the English seat of Callington in Cornwall until 1807.

== Family papers ==
The Hampshire Record Office holds a number of Wickham's papers. The archive relates also to his grandson William Wickham, who was vice-chairman on the first County Council. The archive includes grants of full powers to Wickham in 1799 and 1801; also poll books for the election of members of parliament representing Oxford University in 1801 and 1809, a plan showing the arrangement of wine in the cellars, and papers about Wickham's success in growing fig trees, which continue to flourish at his home in Binsted. His other property was Lullebrook Manor at Cookham in Berkshire.

== Poldark ==
As the historical spy-master William Wickham appeared in the Poldark novels of Winston Graham, and in the 2015 BBC historical drama series of the same name. His character was played by Anthony Calf.

== Sources ==
- Durey, Michael (2006). "William Wickham, the Christ Church Connection and the Rise and Fall of the Security Service in Britain, 1793–1801", The English Historical Review 121#492 (June 2006), pp. 714–745.
- Durey, Michael (2006). "When great men fall out: William Wickham's resignation as chief secretary for Ireland in January 1804." Parliamentary History 25.3: 334–356.
- Geohegan, Patrick (2009). "Wickham, William", Dictionary of Irish Biography".
- Sparrow, Elizabeth (n.d.). "Wickham, William", Oxford Dictionary of National Biography.
- Sparrow, Elizabeth (1990).The Alien Office, 1792–1806 The Historical Journal, (June 1990), pp. 361–384. Cambridge University Press .

== Other publications ==
- Durey, Michael (2009). William Wickham, Master Spy: The Secret War Against the French Revolution. Pickering & Chatto. ISBN 9781851969838.
- Mitchell, Harvey (1965). The Underground War Against Revolutionary France: The Mission of William Wickham 1794-1800. Oxford University Press.
- Wickham, William (1870). The correspondence of ..William Wickham from the year 1794. Ed., with notes, by W. Wickham From Internet Archive.

Diplomatic posts
| Preceded by Lord Robert FitzGerald | British Minister to the Swiss Cantons; 1795–1798 | Succeeded by James Talbot |
Parliament of the United Kingdom
| Preceded by John Bagwell | Member of Parliament for Cashel; 1802–1806 | Succeeded by Viscount Primrose |
| Preceded by Ambrose St John; Paul Orchard | Member of Parliament for Callington; 1806–1807; With: William Garrow | Succeeded by Thomas Carter; Lord Binning |
Political offices
| Preceded by Charles Greville | Under-Secretary of State for the Home Department; 1798–1801 | Succeeded by Edward Finch-Hatton |
| Preceded by Charles Abbot | Chief Secretary for Ireland; 1802–1804 | Succeeded by Sir Evan Nepean, Bt |
