= John Vallentin =

Victoria Cross recipient

John Franks Vallentin VC
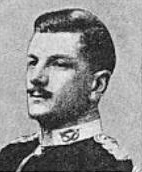
- Born: 14 May 1882; Lambeth, London, England
- Died: 7 November 1914 (aged 32); Zillebeke, Belgium
- Relatives: Archibald Thomas Pechey (cousin) Fanny Cradock (first cousin once removed) Elinor Frances Vallentin (aunt-in-law)
- Military career
- Allegiance: United Kingdom
- Branch: British Army
- Service years: 1899−1914
- Rank: Captain
- Units: Rifle Brigade (The Prince Consort's Own); Royal Sussex Regiment; South Staffordshire Regiment
- Conflicts: Second Boer War; World War I: First Battle of Ypres †
- Awards: Victoria Cross

Captain John Franks Vallentin, VC (14 May 1882 − 7 November 1914) was a British Army officer and an English recipient of the Victoria Cross (VC), the highest and most prestigious award for gallantry in the face of the enemy that can be awarded to British and Commonwealth forces.

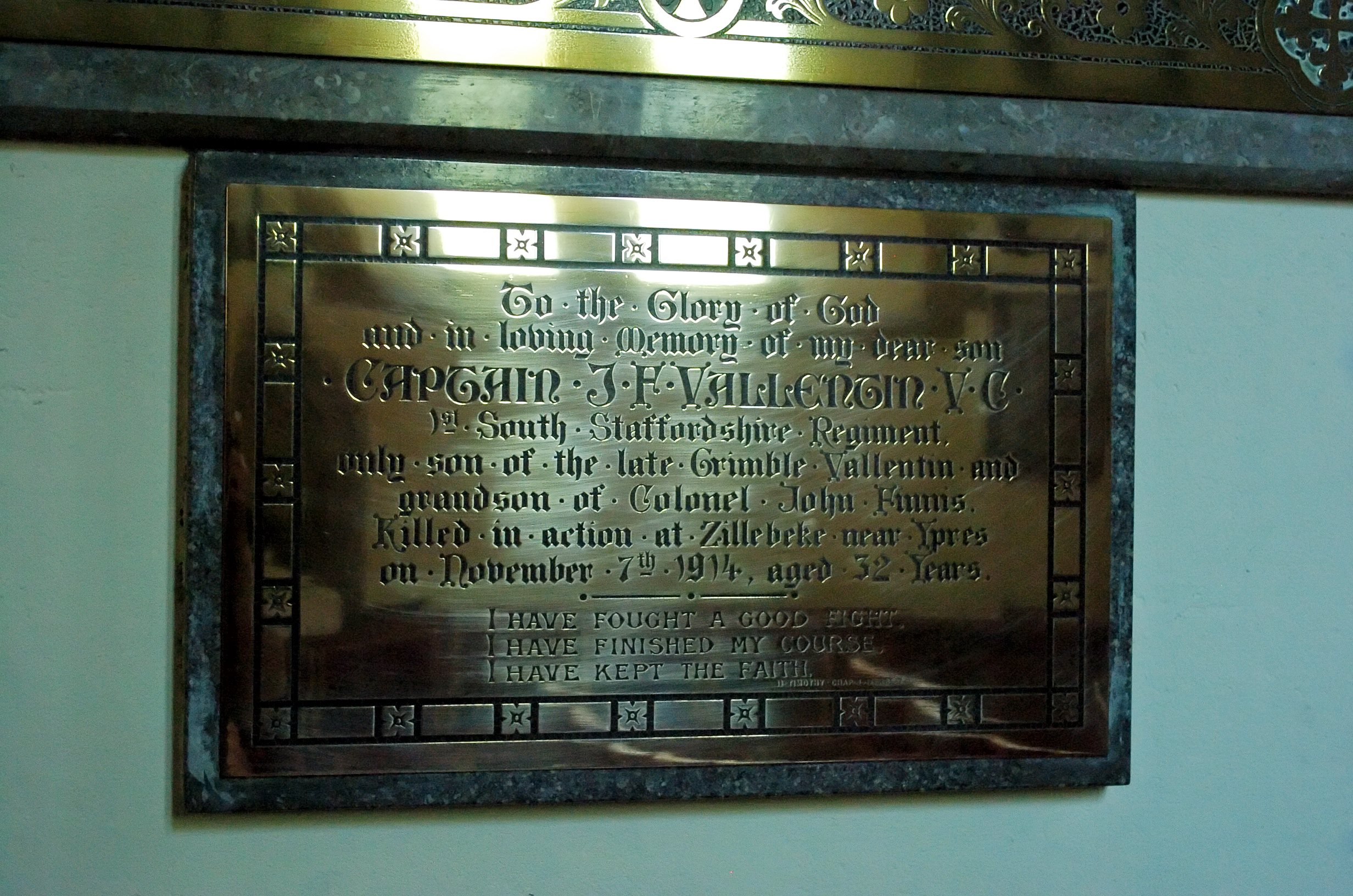
A memorial plaque to Vallentin in St Leonards Church, Hythe, Kent

Vallentin was born in Lambeth to distiller Grimble Vallentin and Lucy Ann Vallentin née Finnis. He was the nephew of Brevet-Major John Maximilian Vallentin (1865–1901) and of the noted naturalist Rupert Vallentin (1859–1934) husband of Elinor Frances Vallentin. His grandfather Sir James Vallentin (1814–1870) was Knight Sheriff of London, and his cousin Archibald Thomas Pechey, the lyricist and author, adapted the family name for his nom de plume 'Valentine'.

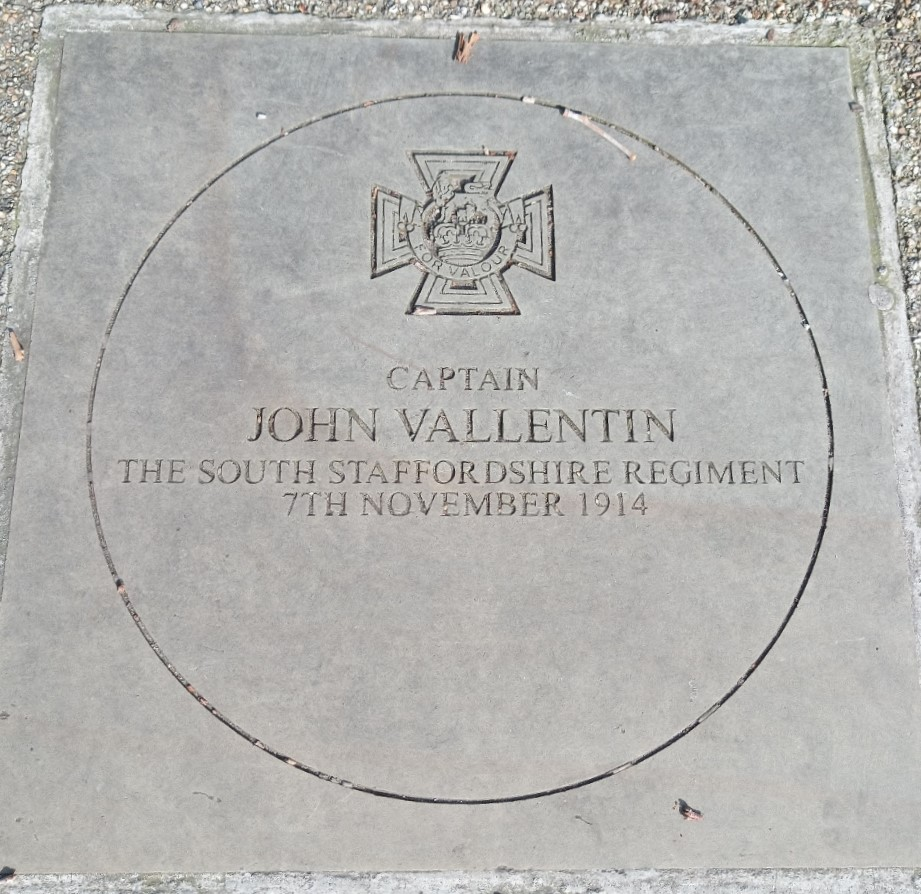
Memorial Stone for Vallentin located in St Mary's Gardens, Lambeth

He was commissioned as a second lieutenant in the 6th (Royal Longford and Westmeath Militia) Battalion, Rifle Brigade in 1899, and promoted to lieutenant in the battalion on 25 July 1900. He served in the Second Boer War in South Africa where he was attached to the 3rd (Royal Sussex Militia) Battalion, Royal Sussex Regiment. Following the end of hostilities, he left Cape Town on board the SS Dominion in August 1902 with the other men of the Royal Sussex, and arrived at Southampton the next month.

He later transferred to a Territorial Force battalion of the South Staffordshire Regiment, and then to the Regular Army.

Vallentin was 32 years old, and a captain in the 1st Battalion, South Staffordshire Regiment, British Army during the First World War when the following deed took place at the First Battle of Ypres for which he was awarded the VC.

For conspicuous bravery on 7th November at Zillebeke. When leading the attack against the Germans under a very heavy fire he was struck down, and on rising to continue the attack was immediately killed. The capture of the enemy's trenches which followed was in a great measure due to the confidence which the men had in their Captain, arising from his many previous acts of great bravery and ability.

== Bibliography ==
- Buzzell, Nora, ed. (1997). The Register of the Victoria Cross. Cheltenham, Gloucestershire: This England Alma House. ISBN 0-906324-27-0.
- Gliddon, Gerald (2011) [1994]. 1914. VCs of the First World War. Stroud, Gloucestershire: The History Press. ISBN 978-0752459080.
- Harvey, David (2000). Monuments to Courage. Naval & Military Press Ltd. ISBN 1-84342-356-1.
