= Froxfield and Privett =

Civil parish in Hampshire, England

Coordinates: 51.04°N 01.00°W

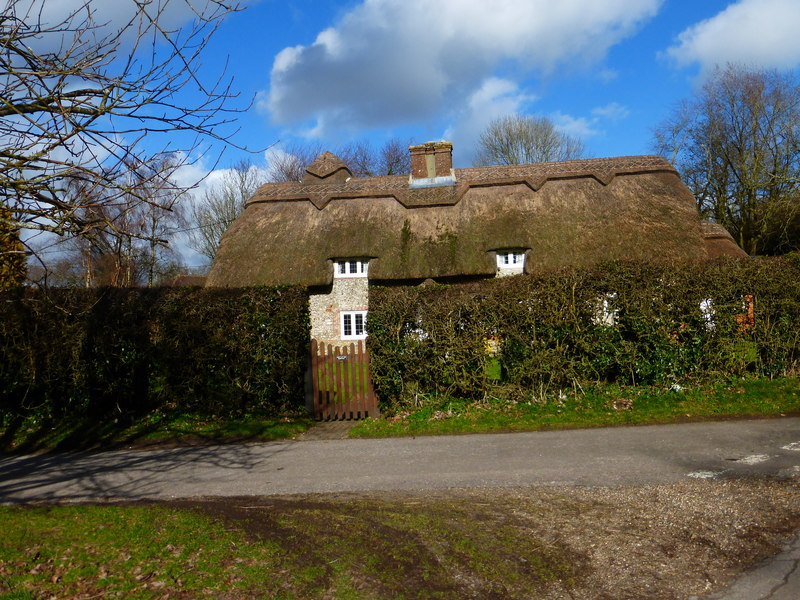
- Basingdean Cottage, near High Cross, Froxfield and Privett

- Location within Hampshire
- Population: 929 (in 2021)
- OS grid reference: SU7027
- District: East Hampshire
- Shire county: Hampshire
- Region: South East
- Country: England
- Sovereign state: United Kingdom
- Post town: Petersfield
- Postcode district: GU32, GU34
- Dialling code: 01730
- Police: Hampshire and Isle of Wight
- Fire: Hampshire and Isle of Wight
- Ambulance: South Central
- UK Parliament: East Hampshire
- Website: Parish Council

Froxfield and Privett is a civil parish in East Hampshire, England, about 3 miles (5 km) northwest of Petersfield. The settlements in the parish are the villages of Froxfield Green, Privett and High Cross, and several hamlets including Bailey Green, Filmore Hill, Stoner Hill and Warren Corner. The population of the parish taken at the 2021 census was 929.

== Geography ==
The parish is on high ground, rising to over 800 feet (240 m) above sea level in the north, and separated from Petersfield by the steep slope of Stoner Hill. It is within the South Downs National Park. The Basing Park estate lies in the north-west of the parish. The western boundary of the parish follows the A32 Gosport–Alton road, and in the southwest corner the boundary follows the A272 Winchester–Petersfield road.

== The parish and its predecessors ==
A civil parish named Froxfield was created in the 19th century, and had an area (before it was enlarged to include Privett) of 4,909 acres (1,987 ha).

Privett was anciently part of West Meon manor, and its church a chapelry of the church at West Meon. In the 19th century it became a civil parish, with an area of about 1,279 acres (518 ha). In 1932, the parish was abolished to enlarge Froxfield parish; its population had been recorded as 172 in 1931.

In the 2010s, the name of the parish changed from Froxfield to Froxfield and Privett. In May 2013, East Hampshire District Council approved the same change of name for the parish council.

== Notable buildings ==
The parish has two Grade II* listed buildings: Holy Trinity church at Privett and Trees Cottage, between Froxfield Green and High Cross. At the core of the cottage is part of a 14th-century hall; the dwelling was altered and enlarged in the 16th, 17th and late 20th centuries.

== Amenities ==
Froxfield village hall, and Froxfield pre-school and primary school, are at High Cross, a little east of the centre of the parish.

There are two Church of England churches: St Peter's at High Cross (1862) and St Peter-on-the-Green at Froxfield Green (1886, on the site of a much older church). Today both churches are part of the Steep and Froxfield with Privett benefice, a group of four rural parishes. The substantial Holy Trinity church at Privett, linked to Basing Park, was built in 1878 and is a Grade II* listed building. After being declared redundant, Holy Trinity was placed in the care of the Churches Conservation Trust.

The Trooper Inn is in the east of the parish, and further north the Pub with No Name is just beyond the parish boundary.
