= William Wickham (Conservative politician) =

British politician (1831-1897)

William Wickham FLS
- Wickham in 1895

Member of Parliament for Petersfield
- In office 1892–1897
- Preceded by: Viscount Wolmer
- Succeeded by: William Graham Nicholson

Personal details
- Born: 1831; London, England
- Died: 16 May 1897 (aged 65–66)
- Resting place: Binsted churchyard, Hampshire, England
- Political party: Conservative
- Spouse: Spohia Emma (m. 1860)
- Children: 2
- Parents: Henry Lewis Wickham (father); Lucy Markham (mother)
- Relatives: William Wickham (paternal grandfather)
- Education: Westminster School
- Alma mater: St Peter's College, Oxford; Balliol College, Oxford

William Wickham FLS (1831 – 16 May 1897) was a Member of Parliament for Petersfield, a High Sheriff of Hampshire, Chairman of the Petty sessional division, and served on the Board of guardians, being Guardian of West Worldham.

== Early years ==
He was bom in London in 1831, the eldest son of Henry Lewis Wickham (1789–1864), of Binsted Wyck, Receiver General of Gibraltar. His mother was Lucy, youngest daughter of William Markham, of Becca Hall, Yorkshire. He was sixth in descent from Bishop William Wickham, Bishop of Winchester and Bishop of Lincoln. He was educated at Westminster School and New Inn Hall. He received a B.A. degree in 1854, and an M.A. degree in 1857 from Balliol College, Oxford.

== Career ==
He was called to the Bar at the Inner Temple in 1857, and in 1888–89 was High Sheriff of Hampshire. In 1892, he entered Parliament in the Conservative interest as the representative for Petersfield, succeeding Viscount Wolmer; in 1895 he was returned unopposed. He sat on the Alton Bench, and for nearly 20 years acted as Chairman of the Petty sessional division. He was a member of the Board of Guardians, first as an ex officio member, and later as Guardian for West Worldham. He served as the County Councillor for the Selborne division. Wickham was a director of the Sun Fire and Life Assurance Company. He was the editor of the Correspondence (1870) of the Rt. Hon. William Wickham, his grandfather and a spymaster.

== Personal life ==
Wickham owned a demesne at Binsted Wyck, near Alton. He was a Fellow of the Linnean Society. He married Sophia Emma in 1860; they had two daughters. He died in 1897 and was buried in the churchyard at Binsted with every demonstration of the affectionate regard and respect in which he was held by all who knew him.

Parliament of the United Kingdom
Preceded by Viscount Wolmer	Member of Parliament for Petersfield; 1892–1897	Succeeded by William Graham Nicholson
