= Archibald Thomas Pechey =

Crime fiction writer and lyricist from England (1876–1961)

- Born: 26 September 1876; West Ham, Essex, England
- Died: 29 November 1961 (aged 85); Wells, Somerset, England
- Occupations: Novelist and lyricist
- Spouse: Bijou Sortain Hancock
- Children: Fanny Cradock
- Relatives: John Vallentin (cousin)
- Writing career
- Pen name: Valentine; Mark Cross

Archibald Thomas Pechey (26 September 1876 in West Ham, Essex – 29 November 1961 in Wells, Somerset, England) often credited as Valentine, was an English lyricist and novelist. The pen name Valentine was derived from his mother's family the Vallentins, who were London distillers. Pechey's maternal grandfather Sir James Vallentin (1814–1870) was Knight Sheriff of London, and Master of the Worshipful Company of Distillers. By the 1880s Pechey's uncle Grimble Vallentine was running the business in Lambeth. His cousin John Franks Vallentin (1882–1914) was awarded the Victoria Cross in 1914.

Pechey as "Valentine" often wrote lyrics in conjunction with composer James W. Tate, including for The Beauty Spot. Songs written by Tate and Valentine (with F. Clifford Harris) include "A Bachelor Gay" and "A Paradise for Two" (both 1917, from The Maid of the Mountains). As a playwright his biggest success was Tons of Money, a farce co-written with Will Evans, which ran in the West End from April 1922 for 737 performances.

Pechey wrote stories, such as "The Adjusters" (1922) and "An Exploit of The Adjusters: The Man Who Scared The Bank" (1929), under the name Valentine. "The Adjusters" and its sequels are about a group of amateur crime fighters with complementary talents, who "adjust" the results of the law, often tricking criminals into trapping themselves using a logical analysis of the crime, so that the guilty are punished and the good are protected, released or compensated. The Adjusters characters are Daphne Wrayne, a sporting society girl; Sir Hugh Williamson, a noted African explorer; James Treviller, a handsome young nobleman; Martin Everest, a handsome lawyer; and Alan Sylvester, an actor.

Pechey married Bijou Sortain Hancock, and was the father of well known television cook Fanny Cradock. His wife’s extravagance and his own susceptibility to gambling left him with sizeable debts. He seems to have tried to avoid the debts by moving around the country. He left Herne Bay in Kent and moved to Swanage in Dorset, then to Bournemouth in Hampshire, where his brother Richard Francis Pechey (1872–1963) had become the Vicar of Holy Trinity Church in 1919. He finally moved to Wroxham in Norfolk, c1927, where his debtors caught up with him and by 1930 he was appearing in Norfolk's bankruptcy court faced with debts of £3,500.

Once out of debt, Pechey moved to Somerset, switched his pseudonym to Mark Cross and wrote over 45 crime novels under that name between 1934 and 1961, many of them about the Adjusters. The novels include the thrillers The Shadow of the Four and Who Killed Henry Wickenstrom. Pechey also drew the cover art for some stories.

== Selected novels ==
- The Shadow of the Four (1934)
- The Grip of the Four (1934)
- The Hand of the Four (1935)
- The Mark of the Four (1936)
- The Way of the Four (1936)
- The Four Strike Home (1937)
- Surprise for the Four (1937)
- The Four Get Going (1938)
- The Four Make Holiday (1938)
- Challenge to the Four (1939)
- The Four at Bay (1939)
- Find the Professor (1940)
- It Couldn't Be Murder (1940)
- How Was it Done (1941)
- Murder in the Pool (1941)
- The Green Circle (1942)
- The Mystery of Gruden's Gap (1942)
- Murder as Arranged (1943)
- Murder in the Air (1943)
- Murder in Black (1944)
- The Mystery of Joan Marryat (1945)
- The Secret of the Grange (1946)
- The Strange affair at Greylands (1948)
- Missing from His Home (1949)
- Other Than Natural Causes (1949)
- On the Night of the 14th (1950)
- Who Killed Henry Wickenstrom (1951)
- The Jaws of Darkness (1952)
- The Black Spider (1953)
- The Circle of Freedom (1953)
- The Strange Case of Pamela Wilson (1954)
- The Best Laid Schemes (1955)
- Murder Will Speak (1954)
- In the Dead of Night (1955)
- The Mystery of the Corded Box (1956)
- Desperate Steps (1957)
- Foul Deeds Will Arise (1958)
- Over Thin Ice (1958)
- Not Long to Live (1959)
- Third Time Unlucky (1959)
- When Danger Threatens (1959)
- Once Too Often (1960)
- Wanted for Questioning (1960)
- Once Upon a Crime (1961)
- Perilous Hazard (1961)

== Sources ==
- Parker, John, ed. (1925). Who's Who in the Theatre (fifth ed.). London: Sir Isaac Pitman and Sons. OCLC 10013159.
