= Henry Lewis Wickham =

Henry Lewis Wickham (19 May 1789 – 27 October 1864) was Receiver General of Gibraltar, Chairman of the Boards of stamps and taxes (1838–1848), and principal private secretary to Lord Althorp when Chancellor of the Exchequer. He was called to the bar from Lincoln's Inn in 1817. With his cousin, John Antony Cramer, he published a A Dissertation on the Passage of Hannibal over the Alps (1820).

Born in 1789, he was the only son of the spymaster, William Wickham. Wickham was educated at Westminster School and Christ Church, Oxford. He married Lucy, youngest daughter of William Markham, of Becca Hall, Yorkshire. Their oldest son, William, was a member of parliament for Petersfield. William Herries was his grandson. Wickham was fifth in descent from Bishop William Wickham, Bishop of Winchester and Bishop of Lincoln. Wickham died in Mayfair in 1864.
