= High Cross, Hampshire =

Village in Hampshire, England

Coordinates: 51.034°N 0.984°W

High Cross
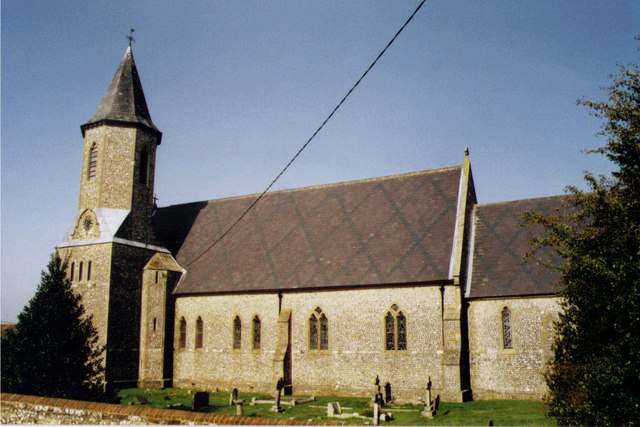
- St Peter's Church, 2003

- Location within Hampshire
- OS grid reference: SU713266
- Civil parish: Froxfield and Privett
- District: East Hampshire
- Shire county: Hampshire
- Region: South East
- Country: England
- Sovereign state: United Kingdom
- Post town: Petersfield
- Postcode district: GU32
- Police: Hampshire and Isle of Wight
- Fire: Hampshire and Isle of Wight
- Ambulance: South Central
- UK Parliament: East Hampshire

High Cross is a village in the East Hampshire district of Hampshire, England. It lies in Froxfield and Privett parish, about 3 miles (5 km) north-west of Petersfield, north of the A272 road.

The nearest railway station is 2.7 miles (4.3 km) south of the village, at Petersfield.

St Peter's church was built in 1862. Today the parish is part of the Steep and Froxfield with Privett benefice, a group of four rural parishes.

Amenities in the village include Froxfield village hall, Froxfield pre-school and primary school, and a shop with post office.
