= Basing Park =

Country house in Hampshire, England

Coordinates: 51.04912°N 1.02835°W

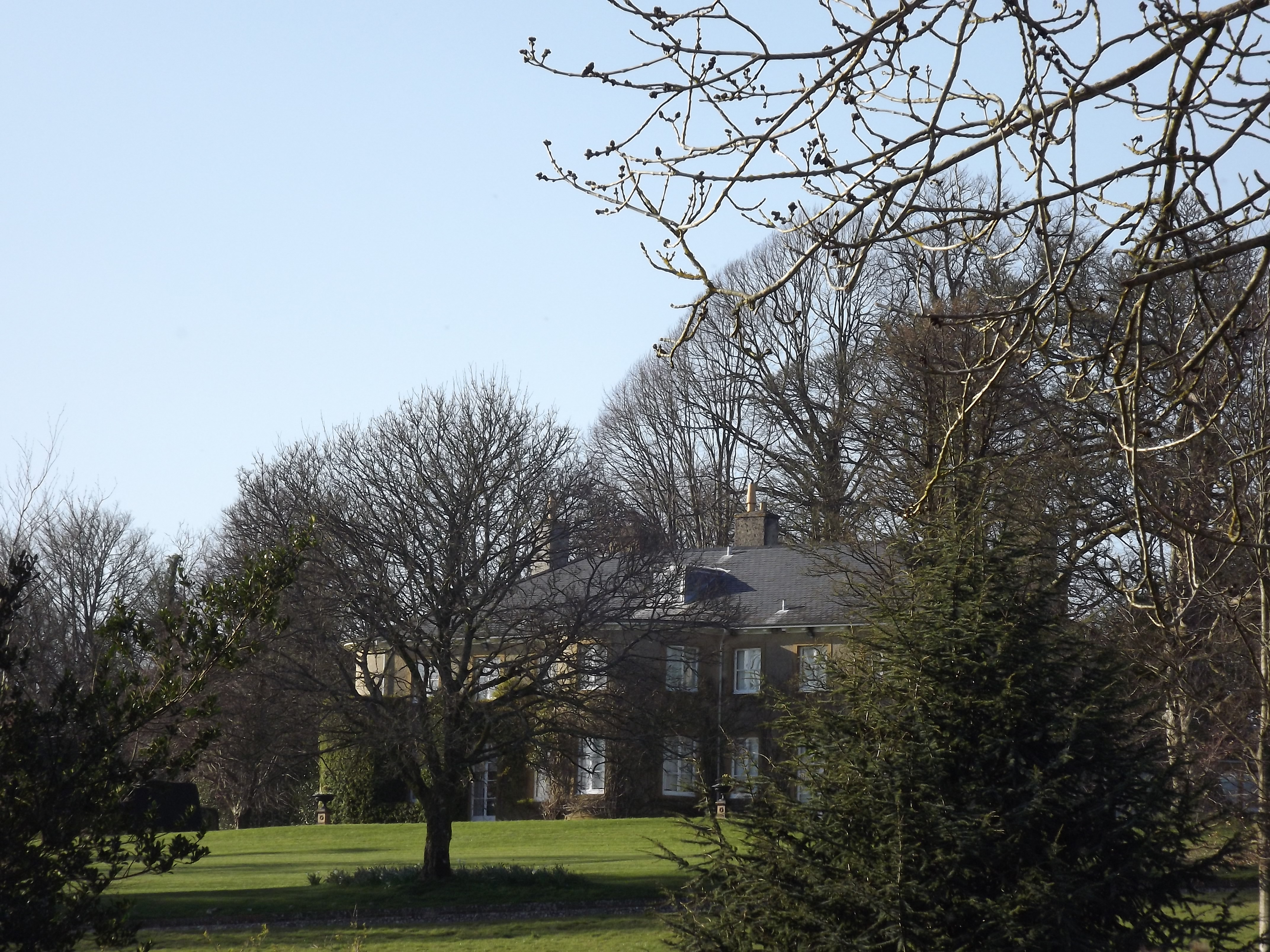

Basing Park was a country house in Privett, Hampshire, notable for being the family home of the Nicholson family. The 1878 'White's Directory of Hampshire' described it as a "large and commodious structure, in the Grecian style, commanding extensive views".

The first building on the site was recorded in 1567, whilst being under the ownership of John Love. It was later extended by subsequent owners, one of whom, employed the architect Sydney Smirke for alterations and extensions. It is believed that three of the original four lodge houses had been built to the designs of Smirke.

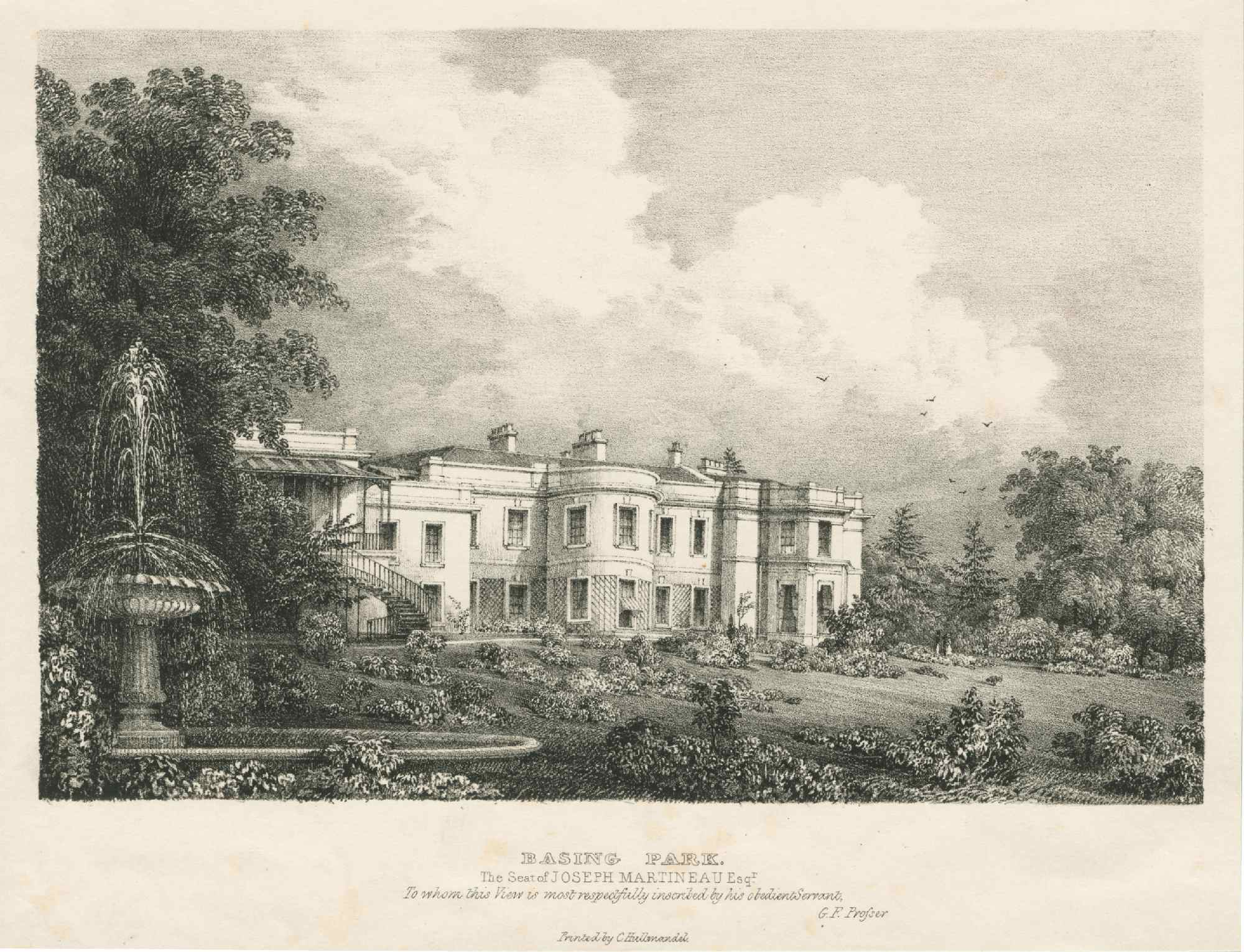
1833 – 'Basing Park, The Seat of Joseph Martineau, Esq.'

The house and estate were acquired by brewer Joseph Martineau, who, by the mid 19th century, along with his gardeners, had designed a well known garden encompassing the mansion. These were as follows; pinetum containing many different species of evergreen trees and shrubs, rose and rock garden, walled kitchen garden, and an arboretum. The lawns stretched down from the mansion to join a ha-ha, constructed of flint and brick which separated the lawns from the park. In 1833, the garden and a detailed view of the mansion was included in Prosser's "Select Illustrations of Hampshire" where his drawing is labelled 'The Seat of Joseph Martineau, Esq.' who, having lived at the house for some time, bought it in 1835. Prosser described Martineau's house as being "like a Grecian Temple". It was Mr Martineau, who, with his team of gardeners (headed by James Duncan) transformed Basing Park into what was later described as the “Sylvan Seat of Petersfield”. A walled garden was erected to the west of the mansion, new drives and gardens laid out, and the parkland later extended to cover some 800 acres. A drive to the south, over two miles long, was partially lined with a double avenue of monkey puzzle and deodar cedar trees.

It was acquired in 1863 by the distiller William Nicholson. Nicholson set about improving the estate he loved so much, he kept the gardens largely unaltered, but extended the mansion upwards, which subsequently gave it a much more institutionalised look. By the time of his death in 1909, the estate covered a massive 8446 acres, stretching from Petersfield to Bramdean. A notable feature of the Nicholson estate is the church, designed by Arthur Blomfield and built between 1876–78, it has the tallest spire in all of Hampshire.

During the Second World War the house was requisitioned by the War Office. Eventually leading to the demolition of the house in 1962 by Petersfield contractor John Digby Lovell. By 1964, a substantial house had been erected on the site of the old house, built to the designs of Claud Phillimore, this new house was coated in a rough render, with plain slate roof. Its design was similar to that of the original mansion, with a distinctive central bow bay window. The new house did not incorporate any of the original material, although as previously stated, its position was largely the same, and commanded extensive views over the surrounding countryside.

In the 1970s, the gardens were redesigned by Otho Nicholson, of the nearby Coles Farm, who had previously owned the estate for a brief period in the 1940s, he was the son of William Nicholson (d.1909).

In current times, the grounds surrounding the house have been largely unaltered since the 1970s. Only a small section of the original 800 acre parkland remains, located to the immediate east, south and west of the house. The mansion is accessed via a sunken lane to the southwest. The previous three driveways have since been abandoned, but many of the original trees that bordered them remain, including a substantial lime avenue which was planted in 1913, and a substantial avenue lined with monkey puzzle and cedar trees. In recent years, a line of beech trees have been planted alongside the lane at Basing Dean, and to the immediate south of the mansion, a line of copper beeches have been planted.

== See also ==
- Gin
