= J&W Nicholson & Co =

J&W Nicholson & Co was a London-based wine and spirits company founded by two brothers from the famous Nicholson gin family: John Nicholson (1778–1846) and William Nicholson (1780–1857) based in Clerkenwell.

== History ==
John and William Nicholson established Bowman & Nicholson on Woodbridge Street, Clerkenwell with their cousin John Bowman in 1802. Originally both from Cumberland, the Nicholson and Bowman families had been distilling spirits in London since the 1730s in Clerkenwell and in the 1770cumbrs at Three Mills, Bow. In 1809, the name was changed to J&W Nicholson & Co and production grew quickly including "British Brandy" and various fruit and spice Cordials - selling throughout the UK. From the 1820s the company started to expand along the west side of St John Street (on the Seckford Estate including Seckford Street and Hayward's Place) through to completing a grand façade located at 193-205 St John's Street in the 1890s.

In 1872, J&W Nicholson purchased the Three Mills Distillery which supplied the grain alcohol to be rectified at St John Street as well as where they produced the Nicholson Lamplighter gin brand. Along with the other great gin families, the brothers John and William would be instrumental in the development of the new London Dry Gin style in the 1830s with the introduction of the Coffey still.

The Clerkenwell site was sold in 1961 to Ind Coope and the buildings were developed in the late 1990s into the St Paul's Square apartments. Today, the 1890s facade is still intact along with the Boundary Wall built by J&W Nicholson in 1838–39.

Three Mills Island is one of the oldest and largest surviving industrial centres in England located on the River Lea at Bromley-by-Bow. The modern complex was developed in the eighteenth century by Peter Lefevre and Daniel Bisson and included the House Mill (1776) The House Mill - Bromley-by-Bow, London, Miller's House, Clock Mill (c. 1753, rebuilt 1817 by Philip Metcalfe), Customs House and Wind Mill (demolished 1840). The Nicholson family's connection to Three Mills is first mentioned in 1773 through William Bowman and the Mill became a regular source of spirit for J&W Nicholson during the nineteenth century before they purchased the site from the Mure family in 1872. In the twentieth century, Three Mills was used by the government to produce acetone during the first world war and then closed permanently due to bomb damage in 1941.

In 1854, John's son William Nicholson Junior who was a First Class cricketer for the Marylebone Cricket Club and Gentlemen of England became a company chairman. During the second half of the nineteenth century, William Junior would develop J&W Nicholson into a hugely successfully company producing a wide range of spirits including its famous London Dry Gin and establishing a portfolio of pubs (from 1873 and today the Nicholson's Pubs group owned by Mitchells & Butler). Nicholson became one of the first five Trustees of the MCC in May 1864 and he would use his fortune to help the MCC secure the site that is today Lord's "The Home of Cricket" in St John's Wood.

In 1866, the MCC purchased the freehold for the ground for £18,333 6s 8d from monies advanced by Nicholson. William Nicholson would also loan money to the MCC to build the "Second Tavern" (1867–68) and secure "Henderson's Nursery" (1888). In 1889, the foundation stone was laid for the new Lord's Pavilion, paid for by a £21,000 loan from Nicholson. Founded in 1787, the original MCC colours had been sky blue, but the colours were changed sometime in the late 1860s to red and yellow and it is believed that this was in recognition of Nicholson's contribution to the MCC.

J&W Nicholson & Co Ltd became a Limited Liability Company from 1 January 1893. William Nicholson died in 1909 and by that time his son William Graham Nicholson (1862-1942) had succeeded him as Director. From 1897 to 1935, William Graham was first a Liberal Unionist MP and from 1912 Conservative MP for Petersfield, Hampshire (a seat formerly held by his father William Nicholson). The family also donated land at Ramshill in the town to Churcher's College. In 1936 the Nicholson family purchased the Hartham Park estate, near Corsham, with its associated quarries of Bath stone, who resided there during the Second World War.

In the twentieth century, Nicholson Gin was hailed as one of the "Purest Spirits" and a favourite for cocktails noted in the most famous cocktail books such as: Harry's ABC of Mixing Cocktails, The Savoy Cocktail Book and The Waldorf Astoria Bar Book.

The Duke of Wellington was said to be a fan as well as Sarah Bernhardt. Bernhardt's favourite cocktail with Nicholson Gin was "The Woon Fizz" as noted in Harry's ABC.
