= William Nicholson (distiller) =

English distiller and Liberal Party politician

William Nicholson MP
- Born: 2 September 1824; Islington, Middlesex
- Died: 25 July 1909 (aged 84); Mayfair, London
- Education: Harrow School
- Alma mater: Trinity College, Cambridge
- Spouse: Isabella Sarah née Meek (m. 1858)
- Relatives: Colonel the Rt Hon. William Nicholson (s); Brigadier-General John Nicholson (s); Brigadier Claude Nicholson (gs); Sir Godfrey Nicholson (gs); Baroness Nicholson of Winterbourne (g-gd)

William Nicholson JP DL (2 September 1824 – 25 July 1909), was a British Member of Parliament, London gin distiller, cricketer and philanthropist in the Victorian era.

Nicholson played as a gentleman amateur from 1845 to 1869 and was twice elected as MP for Petersfield in Hampshire to represent the Liberal Party in 1866 and in 1880, before serving as President of Marylebone Cricket Club (for 1879/80).

== Background and career ==
Of ancient Scottish extraction, the Nicholson family moved from Westmorland to London in the 18th century becoming established as gin distillers.

Born in 1824 at Upper Holloway near Stoke Newington, Middlesex, he was the youngest son of John Nicholson (1778–1846), Master of the Distillers' Company (for 1844/45), by his wife Ellen Payne (died 1863), younger daughter of Richard Payne, a Freeman of Rochester in Kent. His uncle, William Nicholson (1780–1857), was also elected Master Distiller (1850).

Educated at Harrow before going up to Trinity College Cambridge, his family owned the J&W Nicholson & Co. gin distilleries, based at Clerkenwell and Three Mills by Bow, of which he became a director then chairman in 1854.

Nicholson was a right-handed wicketkeeper-batsman, who made 148 known appearances as a Gentleman between 1846 and 1858; mainly associated with Marylebone Cricket Club, he also played for the Gentlemen of Middlesex and Middlesex CCC (founded in 1863). In 1866, MCC finally purchased the freehold of Lord's Cricket Ground in the sum of £18,333 6s 8d using money advanced by Nicholson, after being elected one of the first five Trustees of the MCC in May 1864. Nominated as President of Marylebone Cricket Club in 1879, Nicholson loaned MCC a further £21,000 in 1888 to secure the purchase of Henderson's Nursery and enabling its new Lord's Pavilion foundation stone to be laid in 1889.

Nicholson served as a Justice of the Peace and Deputy Lieutenant for Hampshire, and was appointed High Sheriff of Hampshire (for 1878/79).

== Member of Parliament (1866–1885) ==
In July 1866 Nicholson was elected unopposed as the Member of Parliament (MP) for the Borough of Petersfield in Hampshire, at a by-election caused by Conservative MP Sir William Jolliffe's elevation to the peerage. Returned to parliament in 1868, Nicholson was defeated at the 1874 general election. He was re-elected for Petersfield at the 1880 general election and held the seat until the parliamentary borough was disenfranchised under the Redistribution of Seats Act 1885, being transferred to a new county division of Hampshire; with a wider geographical area, and a franchise expanded under the Representation of the People Act 1884, the new constituency's electorate was more than ten times larger, increased from 801 in 1880 to 8,202 in 1885. In April 1885 Nicholson announced his resignation from the Liberal Party, declaring that he would contest the next general election as a Liberal-Conservative Unionist. Adopted by the local Conservative Association as PPC, at the general election in December that year he lost the seat by a narrow margin to Liberal Viscount Wolmer, and was again defeated at the 1886 election.

=== Distillery accident ===
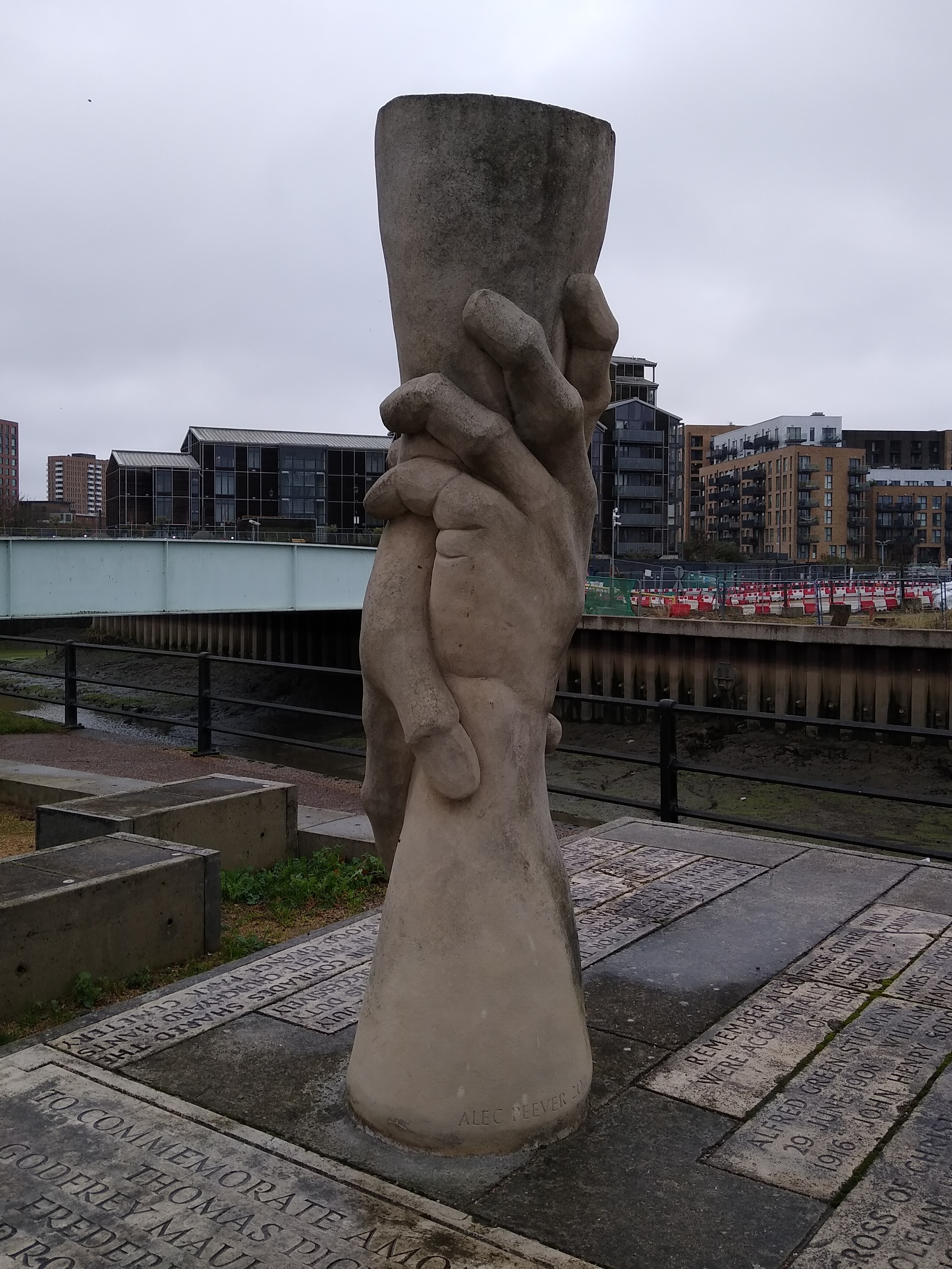
The Helping Hands at Three Mills, Bow

On 12 July 1901, his 29-year-old son Godfrey Maule Nicholson, a company director and brother-in-law to Metropolitan Police Commissioner Sir Edward Bradford, died together with two other distillery staff, while trying to rescue fellow distillery worker, Thomas Pickett, who had been overcome by carbon dioxide while investigating a well.

The Helping Hands sculpture at Three Mills Green in Bow stands in memory of this tragedy, as too does the City Memorial to Heroic Self-Sacrifice plaque in Postman's Park.

== Family and personal life ==
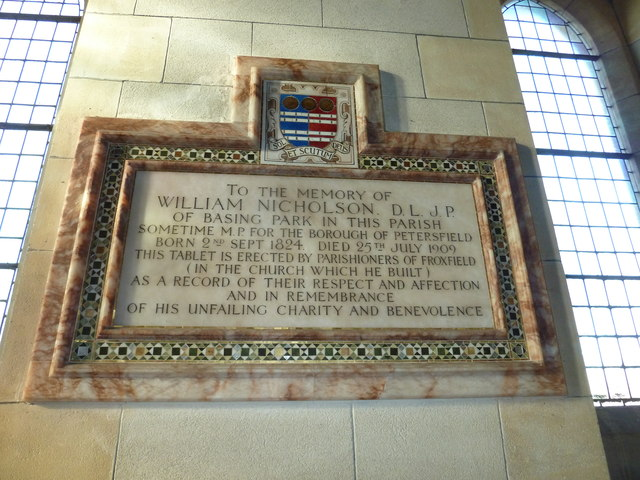
Nicholson memorial tablet in St Peter's Church, Froxfield

In 1858 Nicholson married Isabella Sarah Meek (died 1934), only daughter of Master Distiller John Meek, by whom he had 14 children:

- Colonel the Rt Hon. William Graham Nicholson JP DL, MP for Petersfield from 1897 to 1935
- Brigadier-General John Sanctuary Nicholson CB CMG CBE, MP for Westminster (Abbey) from 1921 to 1924
- Lieutenant-Colonel Arthur Carleton Nicholson TD JP DL (1864–1945), High Sheriff of Wiltshire, who married Susan Dumaresq (died 1966), leaving issue
- Richard Francis Nicholson (1865–1940), of Woodcott House, Hampshire, who married Helen Portal (died 1927), elder daughter of the Revd Canon George Portal, having issue:
  - Brigadier Claude Nicholson CB, who married the Hon. Ursula Hanbury-Tracy JP (died 1977), only daughter of Major the Hon. Algernon Hanbury-Tracy CMG and sister of the 6th Baron Sudeley, leaving issue
  - Sir Godfrey Nicholson, 1st Baronet, who married Lady Katharine Lindsay (died 1972), having issue:
    - Rose Nicholson, Lady Luce (died 2023)
    - Laura Nicholson, Lady Montgomery-Cuninghame (died 2021)
    - Emma Nicholson, Baroness Nicholson of Winterbourne
    - Harriet Nicholson, married Charles Flower, a great-grandson of James Hamilton, 1st Duke of Abercorn, and great-great-nephew of Cyril Flower, 1st Baron Battersea
- Major Hugh Blomfield Nicholson DSO JP (1866–1957), of Mapperton Manor, High Sheriff of Dorset, who married Kathleen Burke DStJ (died 1936) and Eileen Dorothy Northey (died 1968), without issue
- Major Reginald Nicholson TD JP (1867–1952), High Sheriff of Hampshire, who married Lady Laura Knowles (died 1959), younger daughter of the 9th Earl Waldegrave, having issue:
- Godfrey Maule Nicholson (1872–1901)
- Captain Clement Octavius Edward Nicholson (1874–1930), who married Hilda Ohlsson (div. 1911) and Judith Burnaby-Atkins (died 1951), without issue
- Ellen Isabel Nicholson, married the Revd Preb. Edward Bernard (1842–1921), of High Hall, near Wimborne, Dorset
- Edith Mary Nicholson, married Colonel Sir Edward Bradford, 1st Baronet
- Isabel Winifred Nicholson (died unmarried 1959)
- Mary Stephanie Nicholson OBE, married Lieutenant-Colonel Henry Ridley (1851–1931)
- Gertrude Ann Nicholson, married Lieutenant-Colonel George Anson (1848–1916)
- Marion Theodora Nicholson, married Major Edward Talbot-Ponsonby (1872–1946).

Nicholson was seated at Basing Park near Alton, Hampshire (purchased from Joseph Martineau in 1863), and died in 1909 at his townhouse in South Audley Street, London.

== Arms ==
Coat of arms of William Nicholson

Crest
Out of an antique Crown Gules a Lion's Head Ermine gorged with a Collar gemel Azure
Escutcheon
Per pale Azure and Gules two Bars gemel Ermine in chief three Suns in splendour Or
Motto
Sol Et Scutum Deus
Other versions
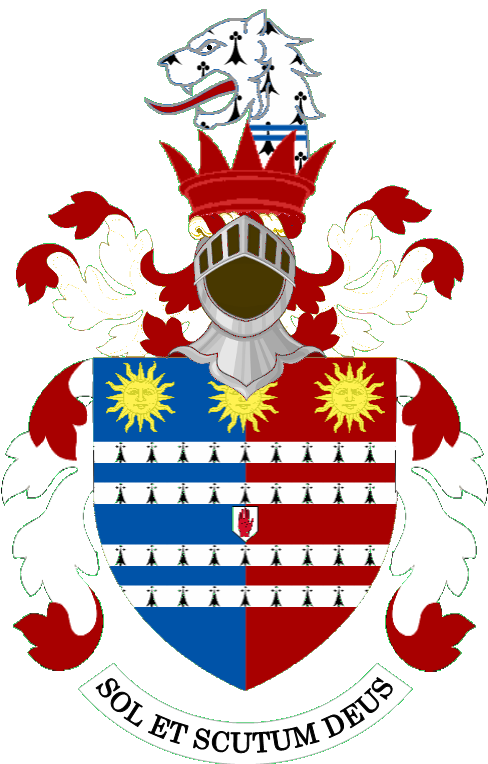

== See also ==
- Basing Park

== Bibliography ==
- Derek Birley, A Social History of English Cricket, Aurum, 1999
- Arthur Haygarth, Scores & Biographies, several volumes, Lillywhite, 1862–72

Parliament of the United Kingdom
| Preceded by Sir William Jolliffe | Member of Parliament for Petersfield; 1866 – 1874 | Succeeded by William Sydney Hylton Jolliffe |
| Preceded by William Sydney Hylton Jolliffe | Member of Parliament for Petersfield; 1880 – 1885 | Succeeded by Viscount Wolmer |
