= Lord Newton =

Lord Newton may refer to:

- Alexander Hay, Lord Newton (died 1616), Scottish judge and Lord Clerk Register
- William Oliphant, Lord Newton (1551–1628), Scottish judge
- James Oliphant, Lord Newton (1571–1648), Scottish judge
- John Leslie, Lord Newton (c.1595–1651), Scottish judge
- David Falconer, Lord Newton (1640–1685), Scottish judge
- John Graeme of Newton (died 1773), Earl of Alford and Lord Newton in the Jacobite peerage
- Alexander Irving, Lord Newton (1766–1832), Scottish judge
- William Legh, 1st Baron Newton (1828–1898), British politician
- Thomas Legh, 2nd Baron Newton (1857–1942), British politician
- Richard Legh, 3rd Baron Newton (1888–1960), British peer
- Peter Legh, 4th Baron Newton (1915–1992), British politician
- Tony Newton, Baron Newton of Braintree (1937–2012), British politician
- Richard Legh, 5th Baron Newton (born 1950), British peer
