= Legh (surname) =

Legh is a surname, and may refer to:

- Alice Legh (1855–1948), British archer
- George Legh (1804–1877), British politician
- Gerard Legh (died 1563), English lawyer and writer on heraldry
- John Legh (14th century MP) (fl.1379), English Member of Parliament
- John Legh (18th century MP) (1668–1739), English Member of Parliament
- Kathleen Wood-Legh (1901–1981), Canadian historian
- Mary Cornwall Legh (1857–1941), British Anglican missionary
- Peter Legh (died 1642) (c.1623–1642), English politician
- Peter Legh, 4th Baron Newton (1915–1992), British politician
- Piers Legh (1890–1955), British Army officer and courtier
- Piers Legh (died 1422) (1389–1422), English soldier
- Richard Legh (1634–1687), English politician
- Richard Legh, 3rd Baron Newton (1888–1960), British peer
- Richard Legh, 5th Baron Newton (born 1950), British peer
- Thomas Legh (lawyer) (c.1511–1545), English jurist and diplomat
- Thomas Legh (died 1857) (c. 1793–1857), English politician
- Thomas Peter Legh (1754–1797), British Member of Parliament
- Thomas Legh, 2nd Baron Newton (1857–1942), British diplomat and politician
- William Legh, 1st Baron Newton (1828–1898), British politician
- ... Legh (fl. 1512), English politician, Member of the Parliament of England for Plymouth in 1512

== See also ==
- Leigh (surname)
