= Legh =

Legh may refer to:

== Families ==
- Leghs of Adlington, Cheshire family dating back to 1315 who lived in Adlington Hall, a manor house in the Borough of Cheshire East
- Leghs of Lyme, family who owned Lyme Park in Cheshire, England, from 1398 to 1946, when the house and estate were given to the National Trust

== People ==
- Legh (surname)
- George Anthony Legh Keck (b. 1784), English politician
- Legh Richmond (1772–1827), English clergyman
- Thomas Legh Claughton (1808–1892), English academic and clergyman
- William Legh Walsh (1857–1938), Canadian lawyer

== Other uses ==
- High Legh, a village and civil parish in Cheshire
