= Lyme Park =

Grade I listed building in Cheshire, England

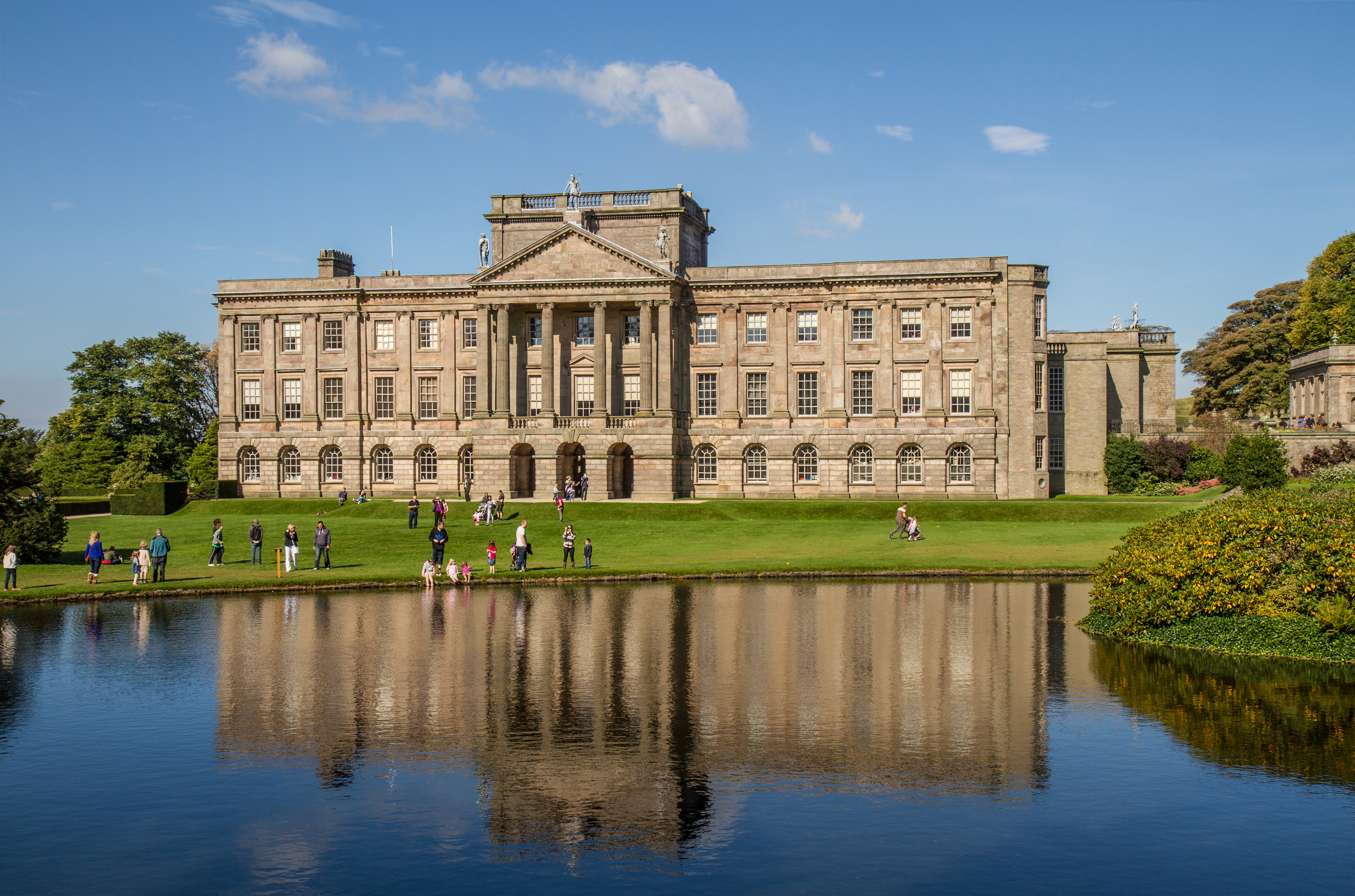
- The south front, south lawn and pond

- Location in Cheshire
- 53.3381°N 2.0548°W
- Location: Disley, Cheshire, England
- OS grid reference: SJ 964 823

History
- Built: 16th century, 1720s

Site notes
- Architect(s): Giacomo Leoni; Lewis Wyatt
- Architectural styles: Elizabethan, Palladian, Baroque

Listed Building – Grade I
- Designated: 17 November 1983
- Reference no.: 1231685

Lyme Park is a large estate south of Disley, Cheshire, England. It is managed by the National Trust and consists of a mansion house surrounded by formal gardens and a deer park in the Peak District National Park. The house is the largest in Cheshire and is recorded in the National Heritage List for England as a designated Grade I listed building.

The estate was granted to Sir Thomas d'Anyers in 1346 and passed to the Leghs of Lyme by marriage in 1388. It remained in the possession of the Legh family until 1946, when it was given to the National Trust. The house dates from the latter part of the 16th century. Modifications were made to it in the 1720s by Giacomo Leoni, who retained some of the Elizabethan features and added others, particularly the courtyard and the south range. It is difficult to classify Leoni's work at Lyme, as it contains elements of both Palladian and Baroque styles. (Note: The house is frequently described as being Palladian in style, but not all experts agree that it is truly Palladian. Referring to the south front, the author of Heritage Gateway says "For a garden front it is magnificent but more Baroque than Palladian" and makes no other reference to Palladian style. Nikolaus Pevsner said "But his [Leoni's] great south front is not a Palladian front" and "Leoni was more original at Lyme Park than one might have at first sight have realized". Merlin Waterson, the author of the official guide to the property, says "The dramatic use of giant pilasters on the South Front was far too close to the English Baroque tradition..." and "...he [Leoni] never subscribed to Lord Burlington's highly selective and academic Palladianism".) Further modifications were made by Lewis Wyatt in the 19th century, especially to the interior. Formal gardens were created and developed in the late 19th and early 20th centuries. The house, gardens and park have been used as locations for filming and they are open to the public. The Lyme Caxton Missal, an early printed book by William Caxton, is on display in the Library.

== History ==
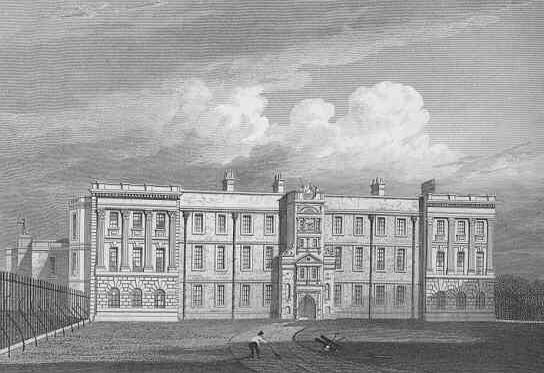
The north front of Lyme from Jones' Views of the Seats of Noblemen and Gentlemen (1819)

The land now occupied by Lyme Park was granted to Piers Legh and his wife Margaret d'Anyers, with letters patent dated 4 January 1398, by Richard II, son of Edward, the Black Prince. Margaret d'Anyers' father, Sir Thomas d'Anyers, had taken part in retrieving the standard of the Black Prince at the Battle of Crécy in 1346 and was rewarded with annuity of 40 marks a year by the Black Prince, drawn on his Cheshire estate, and which could be exchanged for land of that value belonging to the Black Prince. Sir Thomas died in 1354 and the annuity passed to his daughter Margaret, who married the first Piers Legh (Piers Legh I) in 1388. Richard II favoured Piers and granted his family a coat of arms in 1397 and the estate of Lyme Handley in 1398 redeeming the annuity. However, Piers was executed two years later by Richard's rival for the throne, Henry Bolingbroke.

When Sir Piers Legh II was wounded in the Battle of Agincourt in 1415, his mastiff stood over and protected him for many hours through the battle. The mastiff was later returned to Legh's home and was the foundation of the Lyme Hall Mastiffs. They were bred at the hall and kept separate from other strains, figuring prominently in founding the modern breed. The strain died out around the beginning of the 20th century.

The first record of a house on the site is in a manuscript folio dated 1465, but that house was demolished when construction of the present building began during the life of Piers Legh VII, in the middle of the 16th century. This house, by an unknown designer, was L-shaped in plan with east and north ranges; piecemeal additions were made to it during the 17th century. In the 1720s, Giacomo Leoni, an architect from Venice, added a south range to the house creating a courtyard plan, and made other changes. While he retained some of its Elizabethan features, many of his changes were in a mixture of Palladian and Baroque styles. During the latter part of the 18th century Piers Legh XIII bought most of the furniture which is in the house today. However, the family fortunes declined and the house began to deteriorate. In the early 19th century the estate was owned by Thomas Legh, who commissioned Lewis Wyatt to restore the house between 1816 and 1822. Wyatt's alterations were mainly to the interior, where he remodelled every room. Leoni had intended to add a cupola to the south range but this never materialised. Instead, Wyatt added a tower-like structure (a hamper) to provide bedrooms for the servants. He also added a one-storey block to the east range, containing a dining-room. Later in the century, William Legh, 1st Baron Newton added stables and other buildings to the estate, creating the Dutch Garden. Further alterations were made to the gardens by Thomas Legh, 2nd Baron Newton and his wife during the early 20th century. During the Second World War, the park was used as a Royal Air Force lorry depot. In 1946 Richard Legh, 3rd Baron Newton, gave Lyme Park to the National Trust. From 1947, the estate was managed by Stockport Corporation and its successor Stockport Metropolitan Borough Council until 1994, when the National Trust took direct control.

== House ==
=== Exterior ===
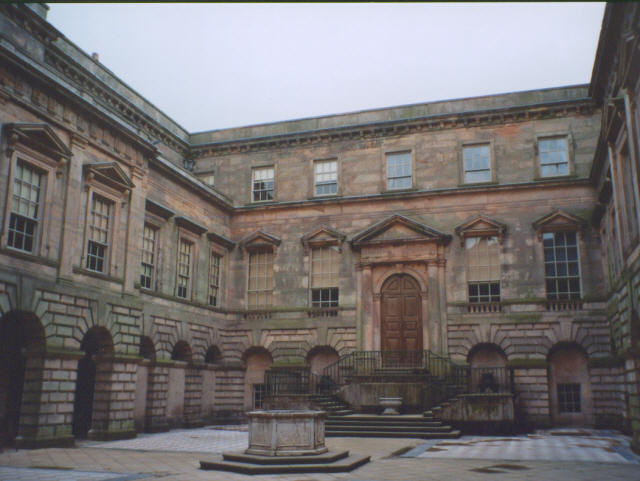
Courtyard and main entrance

The house is the largest in Cheshire, measuring overall 190 feet (58 m) by 130 feet (40 m) round a courtyard plan. The older part is built in coursed, squared buff sandstone rubble with sandstone dressings; the later work is in ashlar sandstone. The whole house has a roof of Welsh slates. The symmetrical north face is of 15 bays in three storeys; its central bay consists of a slightly protruding gateway. The arched doorway in this bay has Doric columns with a niche on each side.

Above the doorway are three more Doric columns with a pediment, and above this are three further columns. Over all this are four further columns with an open pediment bearing an image of Minerva. The architectural historian Nikolaus Pevsner referred to this gateway as "the craziest Elizabethan frontispiece." The endmost three bays on each side project slightly forwards. The ground floors of the three outer bays on each side are rusticated, and their upper storeys are divided by large Composite pilasters. The west front is also in three storeys, with nine bays; the outer two bays on each side project forward. The ground floor is rusticated and the upper floors are smooth.

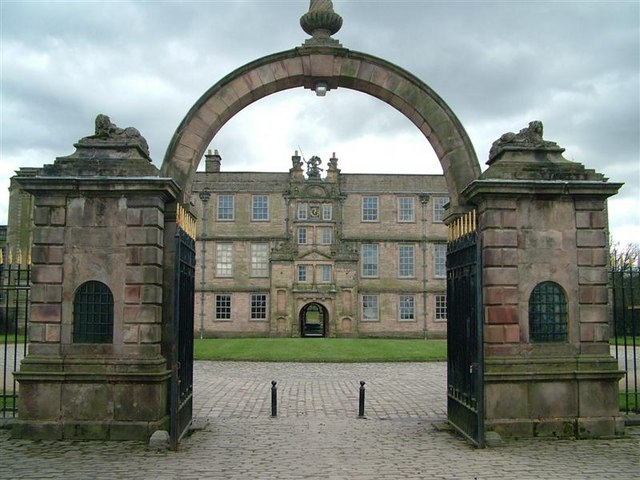
Gateway and north front of house

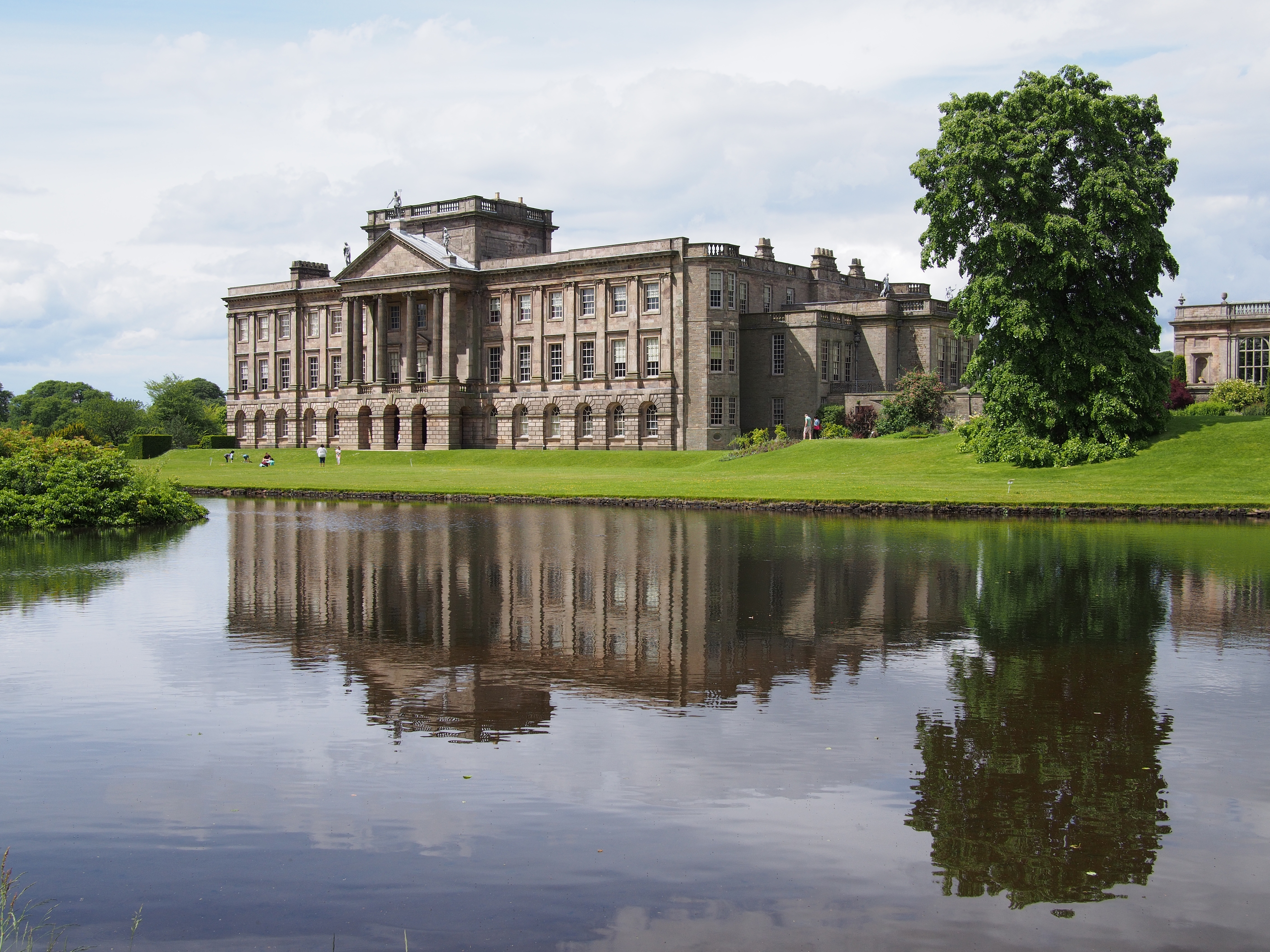
House and lake

The symmetrical 15-bay three-storey south front overlooking the lake is the work of Leoni. Although Leoni had been influenced by the works and principles of Andrea Palladio, both Pevsner and the authors of the citation in the National Heritage List for England agree that the design of this front is more Baroque than Palladian.

The bottom storey is rusticated with arched windows, and the other storeys are smooth with rectangular windows. The middle three bays consist of a portico of which the lowest storey has three arches. Above this arise four giant fluted Ionic columns supporting a triangular pediment. Standing on the pediment are three lead statues, of Neptune, Venus and Pan. The pediment partly hides Wyatt's blind balustraded ashlar attic block. The other bays are separated by plain Ionic pilasters and the end three bays on each side protrude slightly. The nine-bay three-storey east front is mostly Elizabethan in style and has Wyatt's single-storey extension protruding from its centre. The courtyard was remodelled by Leoni, who gave it a rusticated cloister on all sides. Above the cloister the architecture differs on the four sides although all the windows on the first (piano nobile) floor have pediments.

On the west side is a one-bay centrepiece with a window between two Doric pilasters; on the south and north are three windows with four similar pilasters; and on the east front is the grand entrance with a portal in a Tuscan aedicule. This entrance is between the first and second storeys and is approached by symmetrical pairs of stairs with iron balusters, which were made in 1734 by John Gardom of Baslow, Derbyshire. (Note: Gardom worked under the Huguenot ironsmith Jean Tijou at Chatsworth House and provided garden gates at Castle Howard.) In the centre of the courtyard is an Italian Renaissance well-head, surrounded by chequered pink and white stone, simulating marble.

=== Interior ===
The Entrance Hall, which is in the east range, was remodelled by Leoni. It is asymmetrical and contains giant pilasters and a screen of three fluted Ionic columns. The doorway to the courtyard has an open pediment. A hinged picture can be swung out from the wall to reveal a squint looking into the Entrance Hall.

Also in the Entrance Hall are tapestries which were woven at the Mortlake Tapestry Works between 1623 and 1636. They were originally in the Leghs' London home in Belgrave Square and were moved to Lyme in 1903. In order to accommodate them, the interior decorator, Amadée Joubert, had to make alterations, including the removal of a tabernacle and cutting out four of the pilasters. To the south of the Entrance Hall is the Library, and to the east is Wyatt's Dining Room, which has a stucco ceiling and a carved overmantel both in a late 17th-century style, as well as a frieze. The decoration of this room is considered to be a rare early example of the Wrenaissance style. On display in the library are three ancient funerary reliefs from Attica, which Thomas Legh excavated near Athens in 1811/1812 and took back to his estate.

To the north of the Entrance Hall are the two principal Elizabethan rooms, the Drawing Room and the Stag Parlour. The Drawing Room is panelled with intersecting arches above which is a marquetry frieze. The ceiling has studded bands, strapwork cartouches and a broad frieze. Over the fireplace is a large stone overmantel, which is decorated with pairs of atlantes and caryatids framing the arms of Elizabeth I. The stained glass in this room includes medieval glass that was moved from the original Lyme Hall to Disley Church and returned to Lyme in 1835. The Stag Parlour has a chimneypiece depicting an Elizabethan house and hunting scenes, and it includes the arms of James I.

The other Elizabethan rooms in the house are the Stone Parlour on the ground floor, and the Long Gallery, which is on the top floor of the east range. The Long Gallery also has a chimneypiece with the arms of Elizabeth I. The Grand Staircase dates from the remodelling by Leoni and it has a Baroque ceiling. The Saloon is on the first floor of the south range, behind the portico. Its ceiling is decorated in rococo style, and the room contains wooden carvings that have been attributed to Grinling Gibbons. (Note: The family tradition that the carvings are by Gibbons, the evidence for this, and their possible rearrangement are discussed by Waterson.) The Chapel, in the northeast corner of the ground floor, also contains detailed carvings.

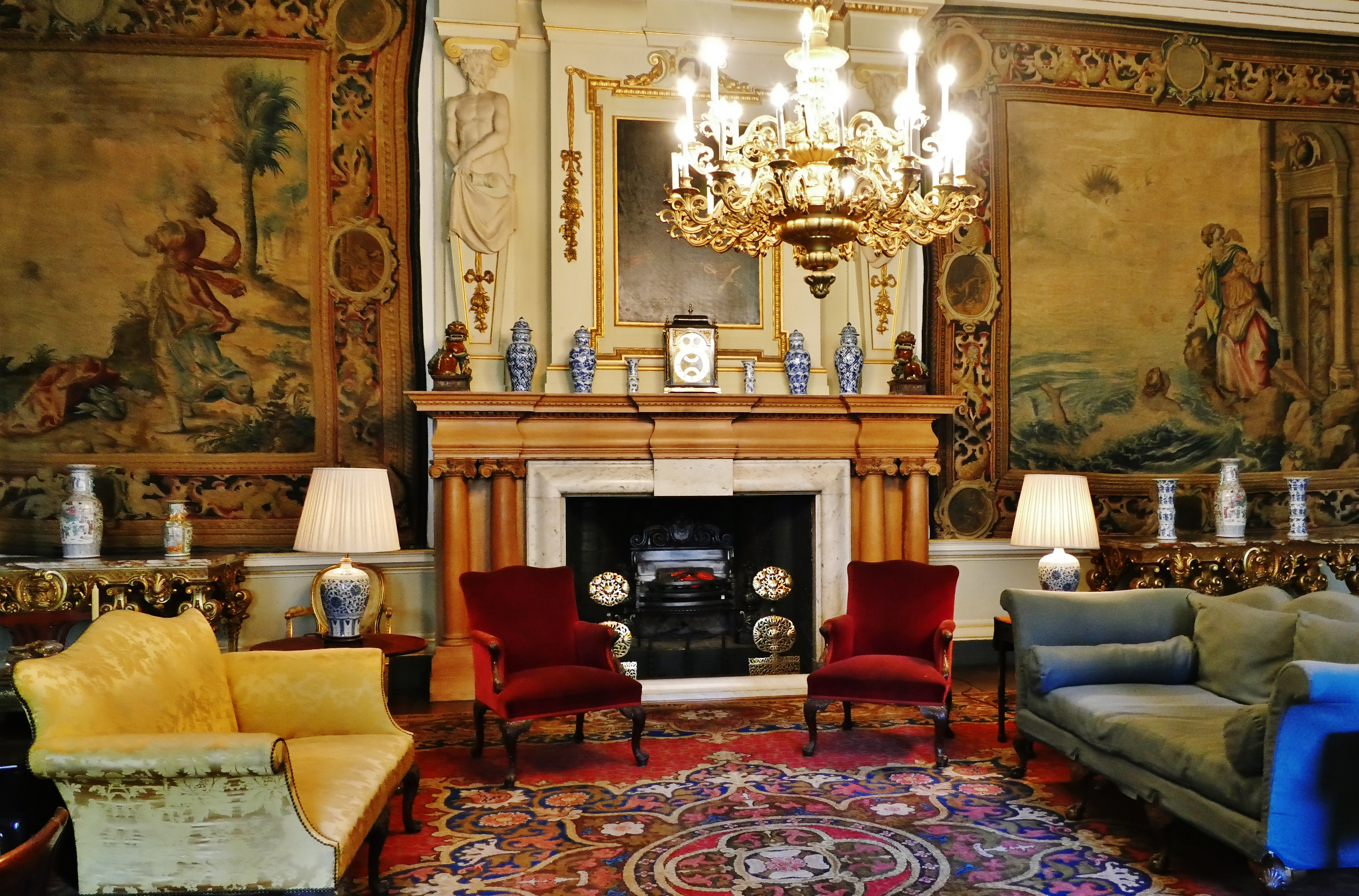
Entrance hall

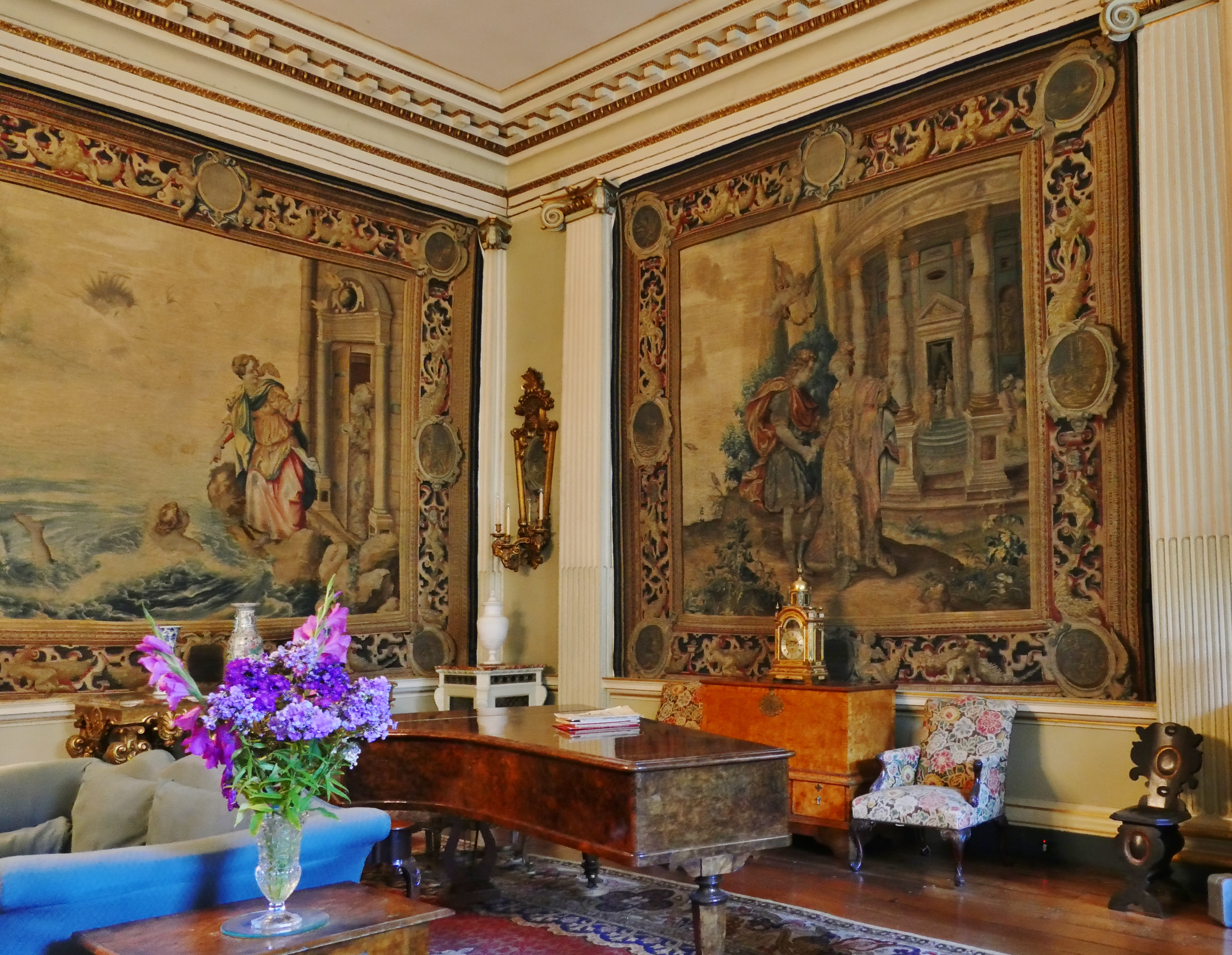
Tapestries in entrance hall

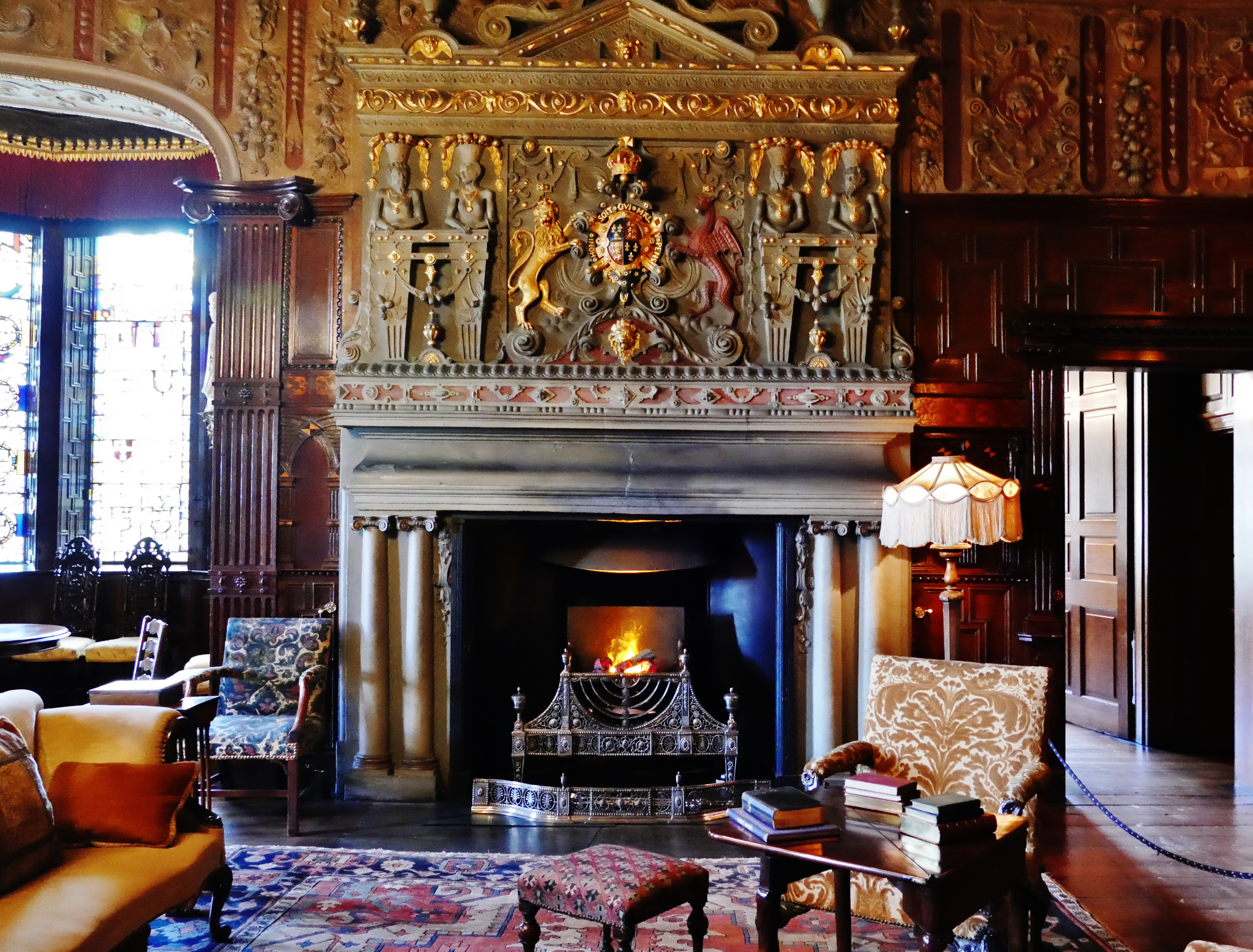
Drawing room fireplace

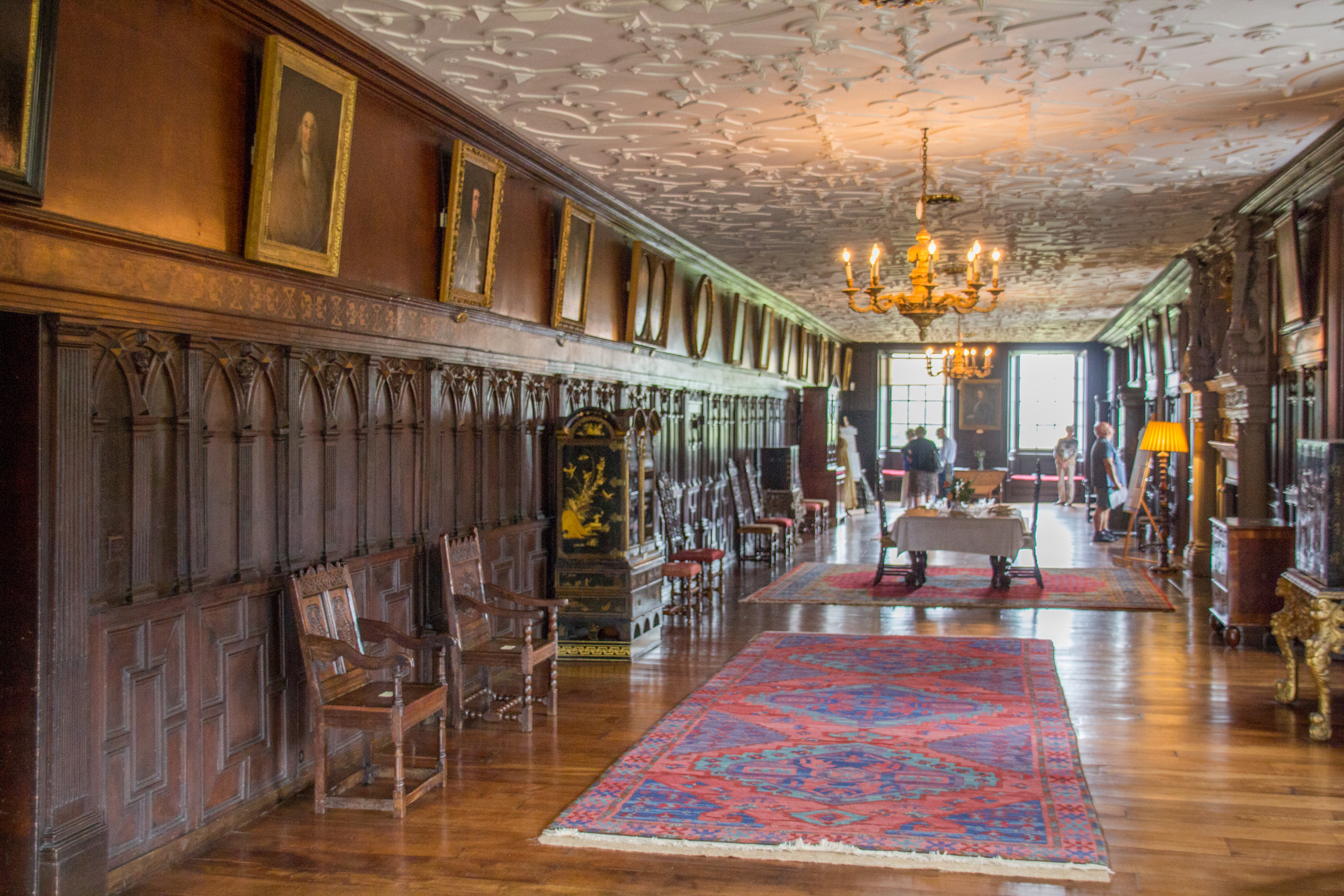
The Long Gallery

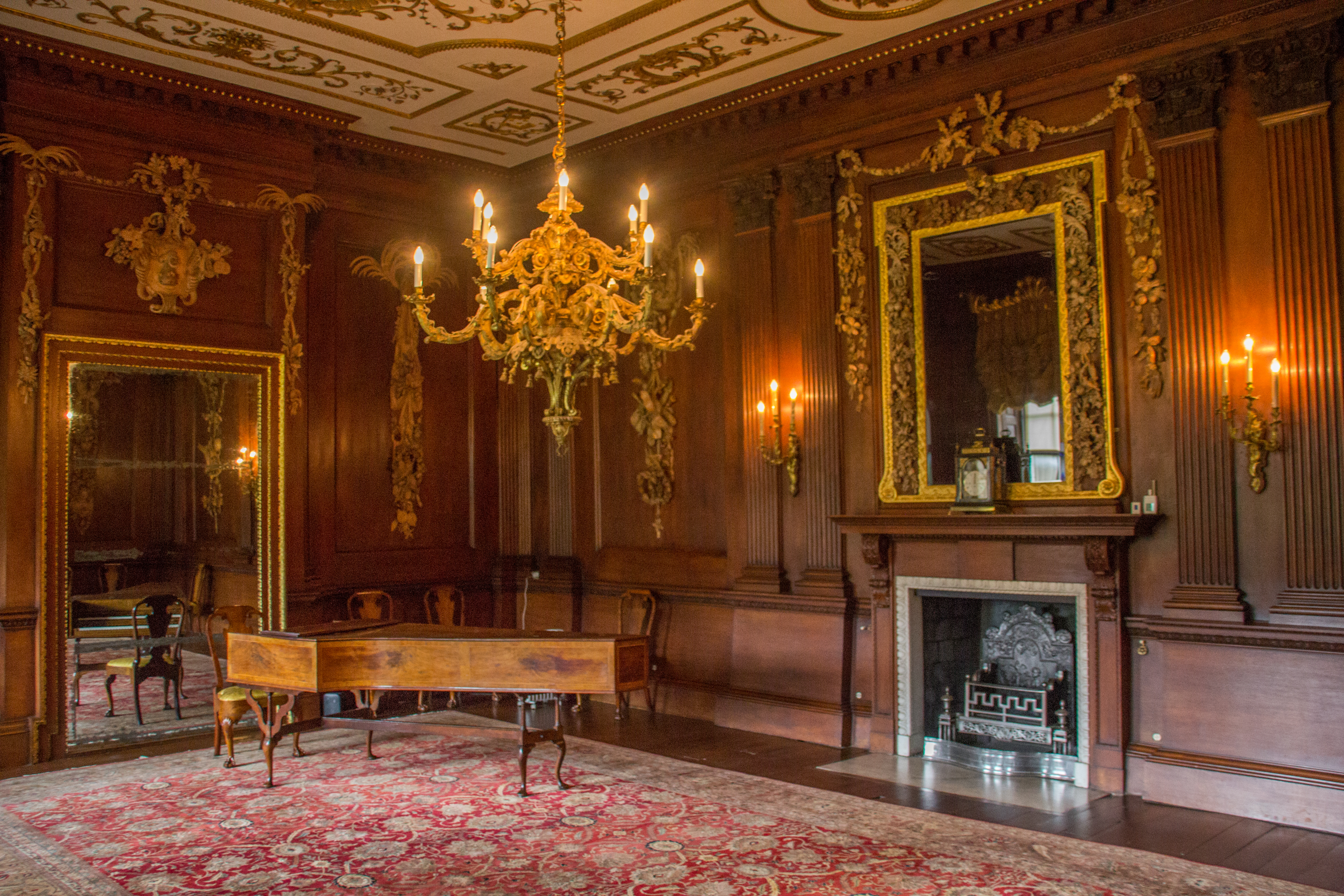
The Saloon

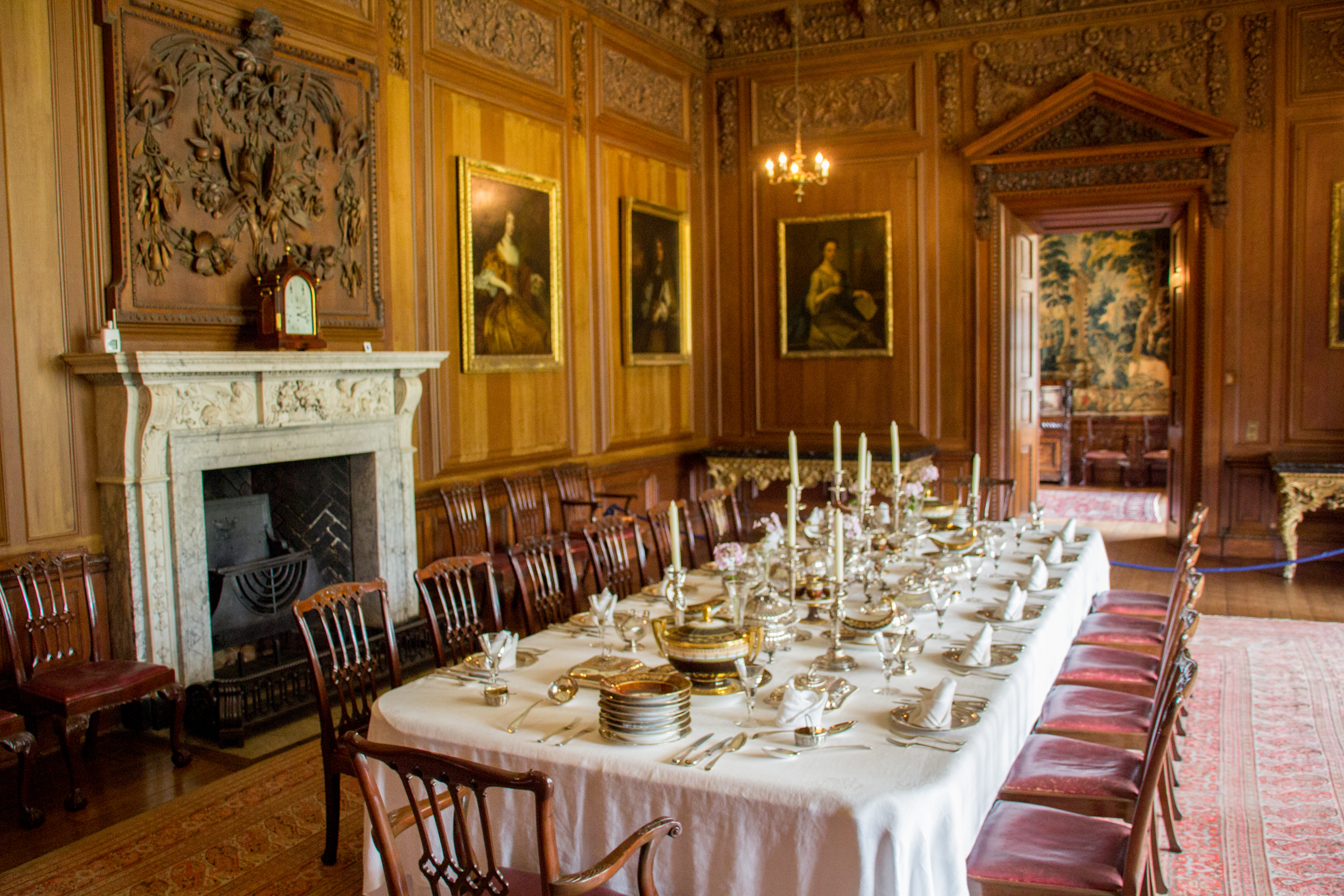
The Dining Room

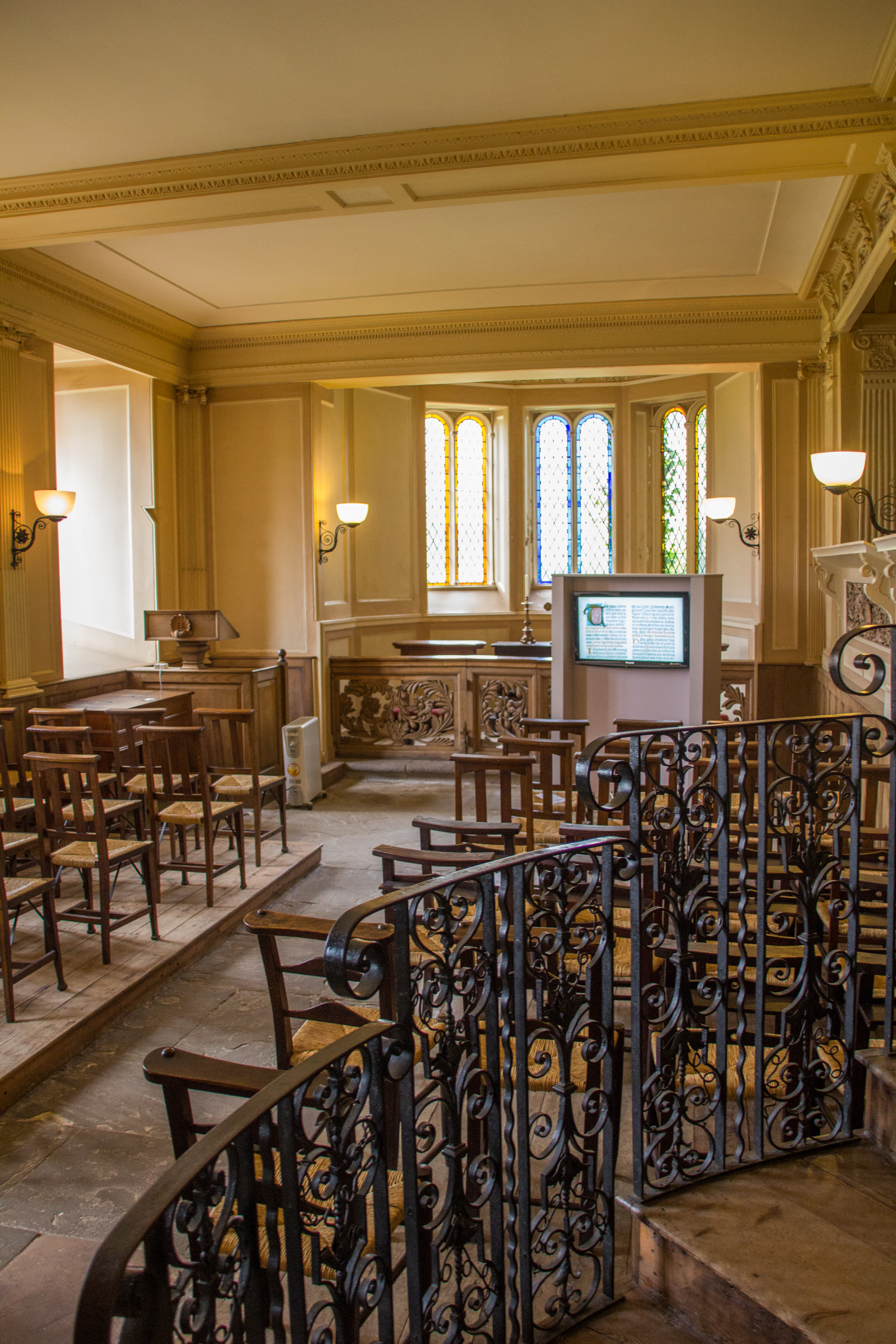
The Chapel

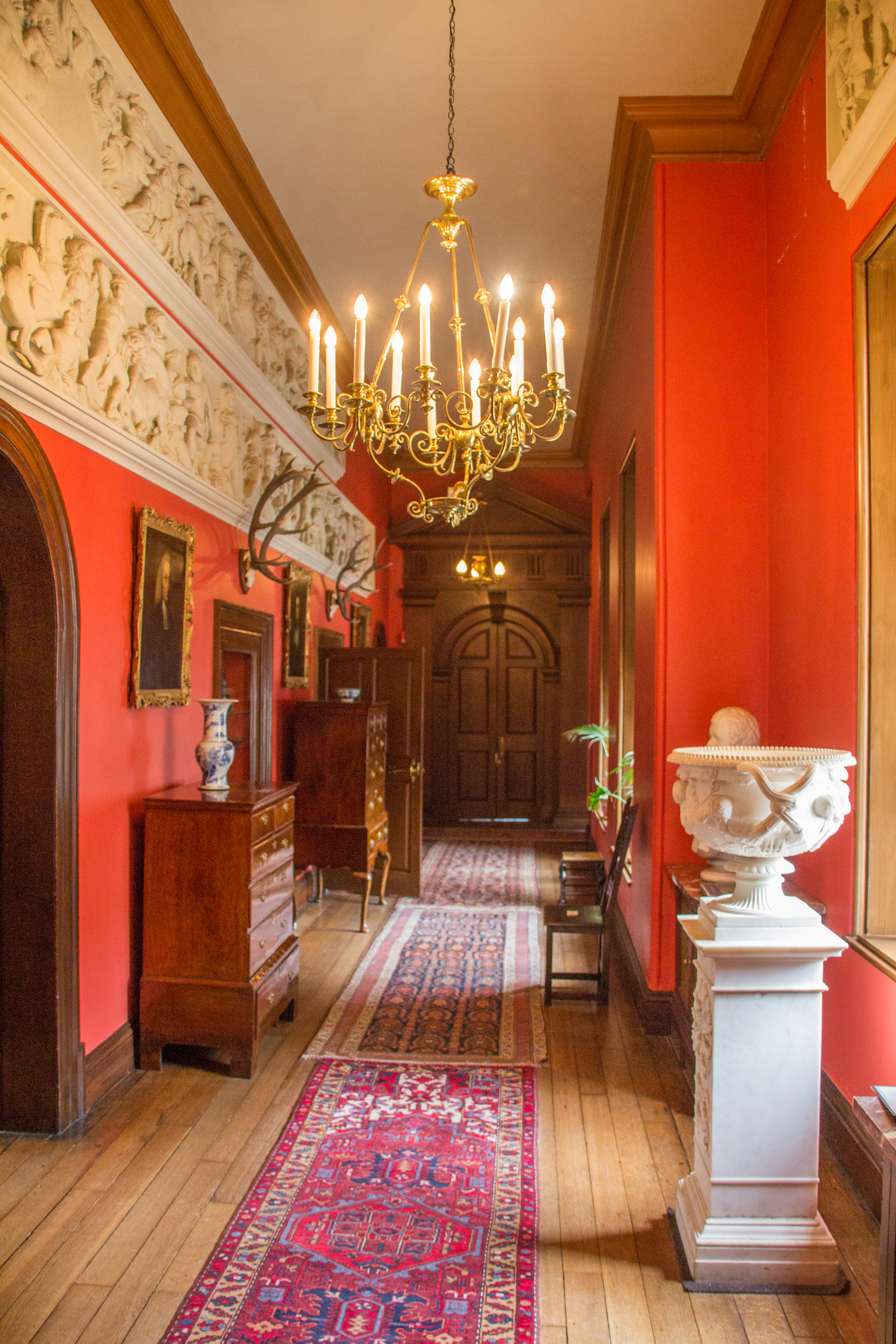
The Bright Gallery

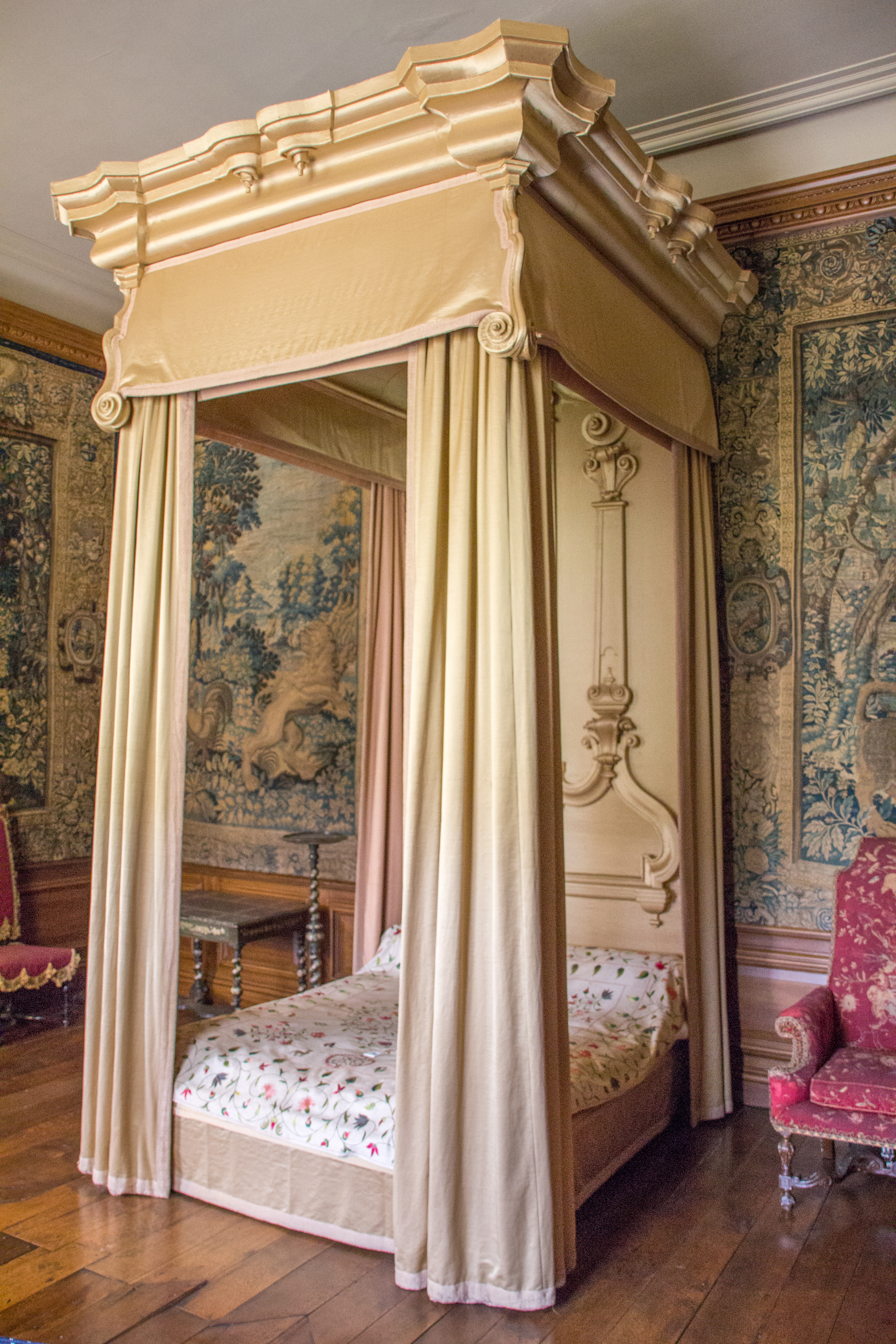
The Yellow Bedroom

=== Lyme Caxton Missal ===
This missal (a liturgical book) had been owned by the Legh family since at least 1508. It is the only known nearly complete copy of the earliest edition of a missal according to the Sarum Rite still in existence. When the family moved from the house in 1946, the missal went with them, and was held for safe-keeping in the John Rylands Library in Manchester. In the late 2000s the National Trust acquired it, and it was decided to return it to Lyme Park. To celebrate this the décor of the library was restored to the way it had been during the 19th century. This included re-graining of its ceiling, reproducing velvet for the upholstery and curtains, and re-papering the room with replica wallpaper, based on its original design.

== Grounds ==
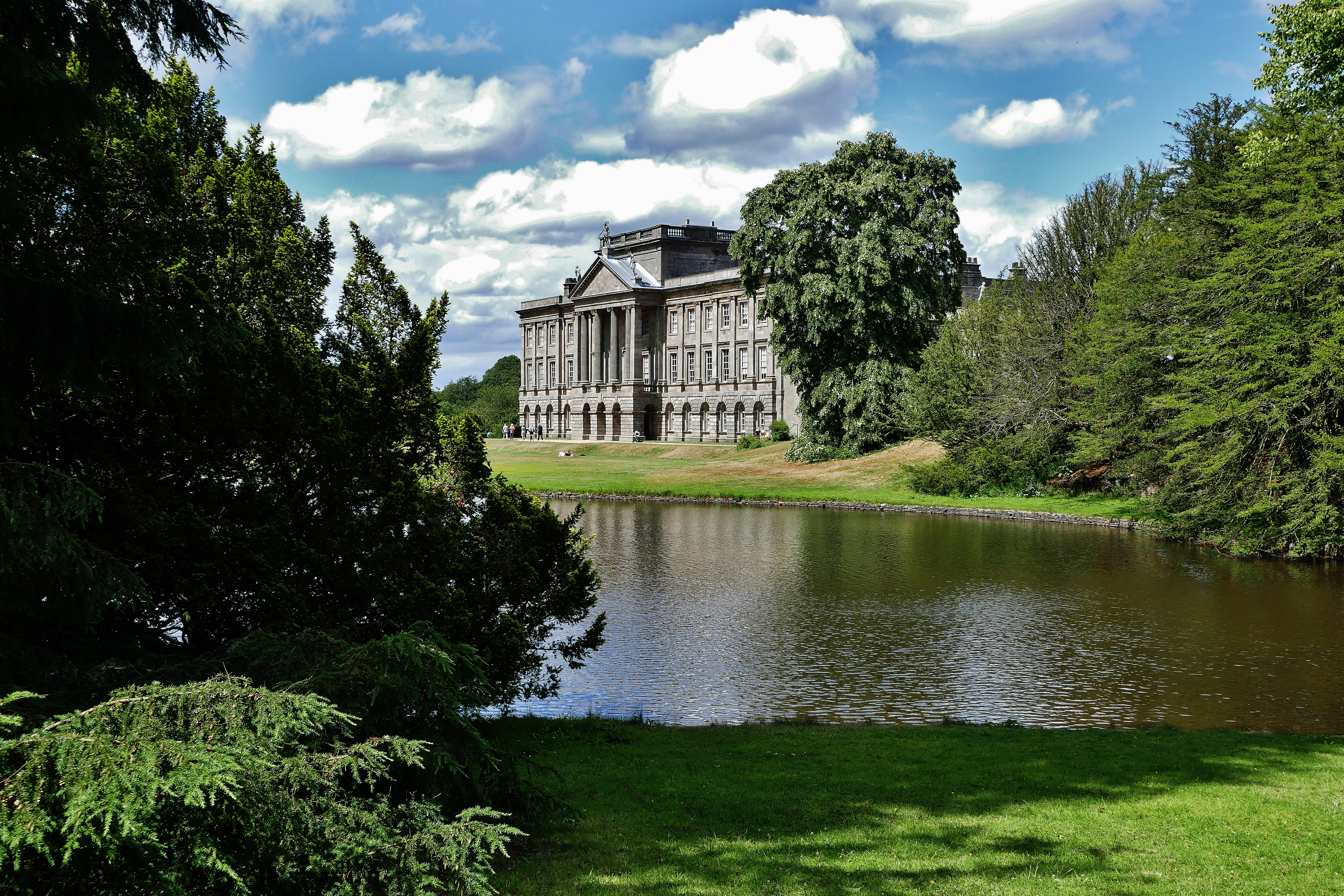
Exterior and the lake

The house is surrounded by formal gardens of 6 hectares (15 acres) in a deer park of about 550 hectares (1,359 acres), which are listed at Grade II* in the National Register of Historic Parks and Gardens. In the gardens and deer park are a number of structures.

=== Gardens ===
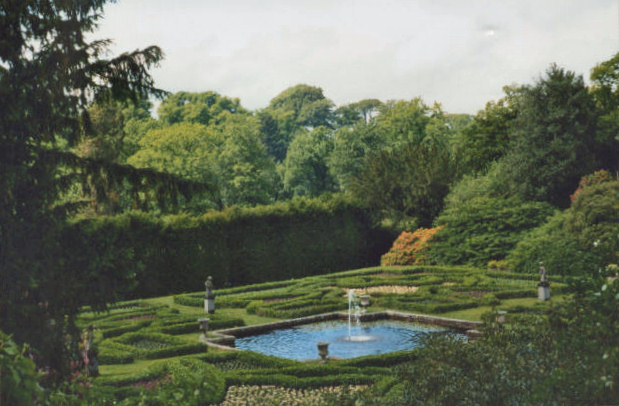
Dutch Garden

To the west of the house is the former mill pond. From the south side a lawn slopes down to another pond beyond which is a small ravine with a stone bridge, this area being known as Killtime. To the west of the lawn is the sunken Dutch Garden, which was created by William Legh. It consists of formal flower beds with a central fountain. To the west, south and east of the orangery are further formal flower gardens, including rose gardens.

=== Deer park ===
The park was enclosed in the 14th century by Piers Legh I. In the 17th century Richard Legh planted avenues of sycamore and lime trees. Richard's son, Peter Legh XII carried out more extensive tree-planting in the park, giving it its current appearance. Red deer descended from the original deer present when the park was enclosed graze in the grounds, as do Highland cattle. Formerly an unusual breed of wild white cattle with red ears grazed in the park, but they became extinct in 1884. Sheep also graze in the park. The Gritstone Trail and the Peak District Boundary Walk long-distance footpaths both cross the park.

=== Structures ===
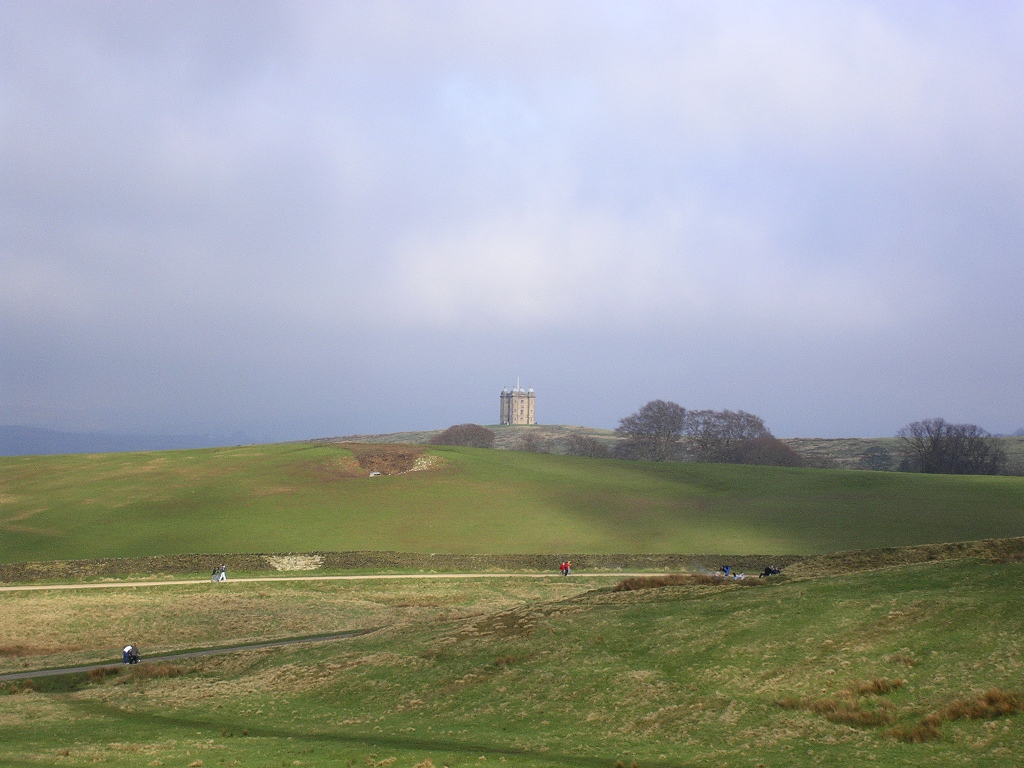
Part of the deer park showing the Cage

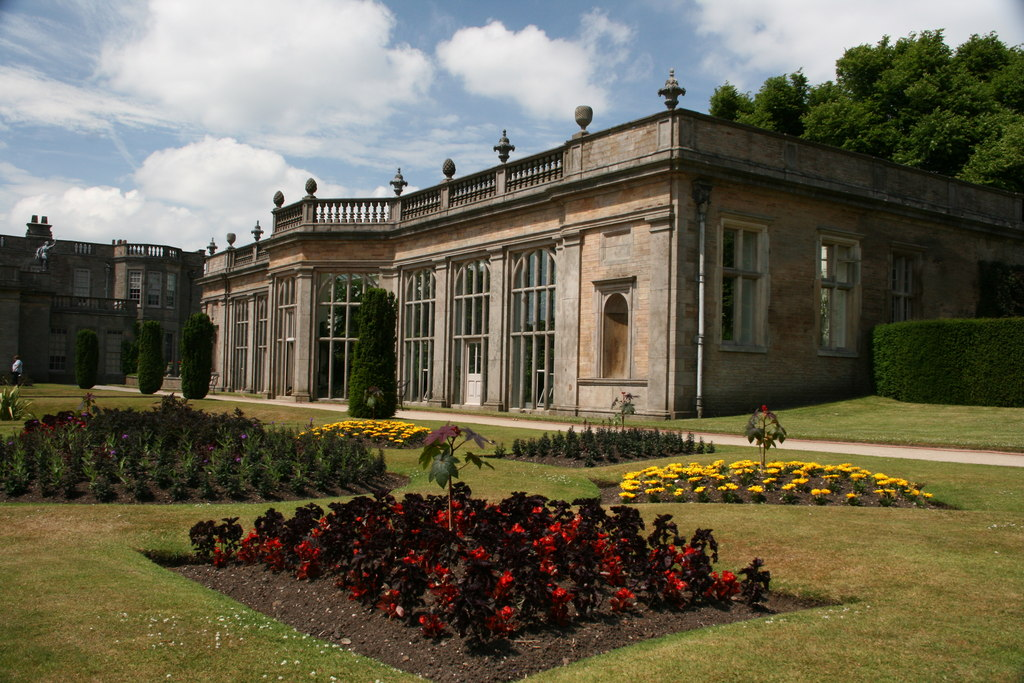
The Orangery

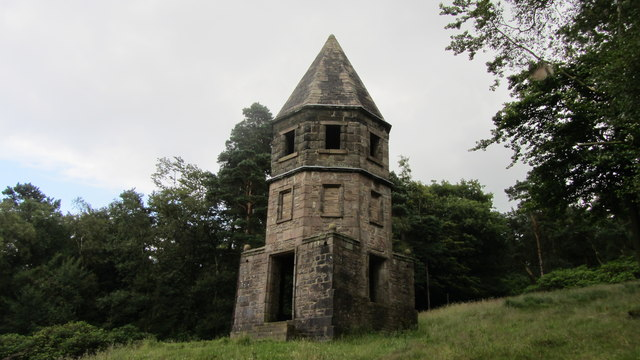
The Lantern

The most obvious structure in the park, other than the house, is a tower called the Cage which stands on a hill to the east of the approach road to the house (53.34453°N 2.05189°W). It was originally a hunting lodge and was later used as a park-keeper's cottage and as a lock-up for prisoners. The first structure on the site was built about 1580; this was taken down and rebuilt in 1737, possibly to a design by Leoni for Peter Legh X. The tower is built in buff sandstone rubble with ashlar sandstone dressings. It is square in plan, in three storeys, with attached small square towers surmounted by cupolas at the corners. The Cage is a Grade II* listed building. Also in the park is the Paddock Cottage which was erected by Peter Legh IX and restored in the early 21st century. To the east of this are the remains of the Stag House (53.32211°N 2.05374°W). To the left of the house in Lantern Wood is a belvedere known as the Lantern (53.33842°N 2.04333°W). It is built in sandstone and has three storeys and a spire; the lowest storey is square in plan while the other storeys and the spire are octagonal. The top storey and spire date from about 1580 and originally formed a bellcote on the north gatehouse; this was removed during the restoration of the house by Wyatt and rebuilt on the present site. It is a Grade II* listed building.

Immediately to the north-east of the house is the Orangery which was designed in 1862 by Alfred Darbyshire. The Orangery is joined to the house by a covered passage known as the Dark Passage. This was designed by Wyatt for Sir Thomas Legh in 1815 and is a Grade II listed building. Further from the house, to the north-east of the orangery, are the stables (53.33912°N 2.05283°W). These are dated 1863 and were also designed by Darbyshire. They are built in sandstone on a courtyard plan and are listed at Grade II.

Other structures in the grounds listed at Grade II are the Pheasant House dating from about 1870, an Italian white marble wellhead in the centre of the courtyard of the house dating from the 18th century and probably brought to the house from Venice in about 1900, sandstone kennels in an H-plan dating from around 1870, a pair of gardener's cottages dated 1871, terrace revetment walls to the west of the house containing some 17th-century masonry with later repairs, the lodge, gate piers and gates on Lyme Park Drive, the forward gatepiers to Lyme Park Drive, dating from the late 17th century and moved to their present position about 1860, the gate piers in Red Lane, and the gate piers, gates and railings to the north of the north front of the house.

== Preservation ==
Lyme Park is owned and administered by the National Trust. The house, garden and park are open to the public at advertised hours. An entrance fee to the house, garden and park is payable by non-members of the National Trust.

In the grounds are shops, a refreshment kiosk, a coffee shop and a restaurant. The Lyme Caxton Missal is on display in the saloon. Events are held in the park. The Bowmen of Lyme use the park for archery.

In August 2019, the park was hit by severe flooding and was evacuated. Though staff attempted to rescue antiques and collectables, a large section of the garden was washed away.

== Film location ==
Lyme Park and its hall have been used in several films and television programmes. The exterior of the hall was used as Pemberley, the seat of Mr Darcy, in the 1995 BBC adaptation of Jane Austen's novel Pride and Prejudice, and as a location for the Red Dwarf episode "Timeslides". It was also used as a location in the 2011 film The Awakening and in the second series of The Village in 2014.

== See also ==
- Grade I listed buildings in Cheshire
- Listed buildings in Lyme Handley
