= Piers Legh (British Army officer) =

British Army officer (1890–1955)

Lieutenant-Colonel Sir Piers Walter Legh (12 December 1890 – 16 November 1955) was a British Army officer and a senior member of the Royal Household.

== Life ==
Second son of the 2nd Baron Newton and Evelyn Caroline Bromley Davenport, Legh was educated at Eton and the Royal Military College, Sandhurst before being commissioned into the Grenadier Guards. He was promoted to 2nd lieutenant in 1910, initially on probation and substantively from 1912.

He served as a Military Secretary during the First World War, being mentioned in despatches and awarded the French Croix de Guerre, and the Italian Croce di Guerra. In 1923 he was appointed a Chevalier of the Order of St Maurice and St Lazarus, for service during the War.

In 1919, he was appointed Equerry to the Prince of Wales until 1936, to Edward VIII in 1936 and then to King George VI from 1937 to 1946 (and then as Extra Equerry from 1946 to 1955). On the occasion of the Prince's visit to Canada and the United States in 1919, Legh was appointed a member, 4th class of the Royal Victorian Order (MVO). He was appointed a Companion of the Order of the Indian Empire (CIE) in 1922, on the occasion of the Prince's visit to India, and a Companion of the Order of St Michael and St George (CMG) in 1925, on the occasion of the Prince's visit to Africa and South America. He was promoted to Commander of the Royal Victorian Order (CVO) in the 1937 Coronation Honours.

In 1941, Legh became Master of the Household, a post he held until his retirement in 1953. He was promoted to Knight Commander of the Royal Victorian Order (KCVO) in the 1942 New Year Honours (invested as a Knight Grand Cross of the Royal Victorian Order (GCVO) in the 1948 Birthday Honours. He was also a Justice of the Peace for London and Berkshire and an Officer of the Order of the British Empire (OBE).

On 15 November 1920, he married Sarah Polk Shaughnessy (d. 1955, née Bradford), the widow of Capt. Hon. Alfred Shaughnessy and they had one daughter, Diana Evelyn Legh (b. 1924), who was the first wife of John Wodehouse, 4th Earl of Kimberley.

== See also ==
- Baron Newton
- Leghs of Lyme

Court offices
Preceded by Sir Smith Child	Master of the Household; 1941–1953	Succeeded by Sir Mark Milbank
