= Peter IX =

Peter IX may refer to:

- Peter IX de Rochechouart, bishop of the Ancient Diocese of Saintes in 1493–1503
- Peter Legh IX, one of the Leghs of Lyme in the 16th century
