= Lyme Caxton Missal =

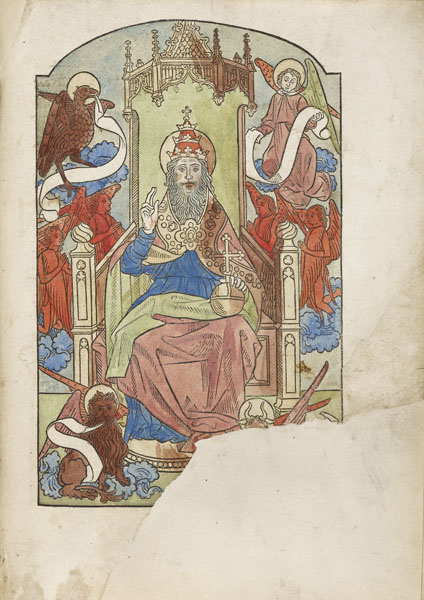
Page from the missal showing God the Father enthroned

The Lyme Caxton Missal is an incunable or early printed book containing the liturgy of the Mass according to the Sarum Rite, published in 1487 by William Caxton. The copy at Lyme Park, Cheshire, England, is the only nearly complete surviving copy of its earliest known edition. It is held in the library of the house and is on display to visitors.

== Contents ==
This missal contains the liturgy for the Mass according to the Sarum Rite (or Sarum Use) and is known as a Sarum Missal. This was the most popular version of the Mass used in England before the Reformation. This copy of the missal is from the earliest known printed edition of a Sarum Missal. It is printed throughout in two colours, red and black, and is the first book to carry Caxton's printer's device. The missal is printed in ink on paper, with a leather binding, and it measures 34 by 24 cm. It was famous at the time it was printed because it was one of the first books printed in two colours. The missal contains 243 of its original 266 leaves and includes two full-page woodcuts coloured by hand; one depicts the Crucifixion of Jesus and the other God the Father enthroned. It was re-bound in the 19th century, but some fragments of the original 15th century binding survive. Later markings have been added to the book by hand. These include a translation of the marriage service in English alongside the original Latin version, obituaries relating to the deaths of members of the Legh family, and prayers to St Thomas. In places the missal has been "censored" by hand, including the crossing out of the name of St Thomas Becket and of prayers for the Pope.

== History ==
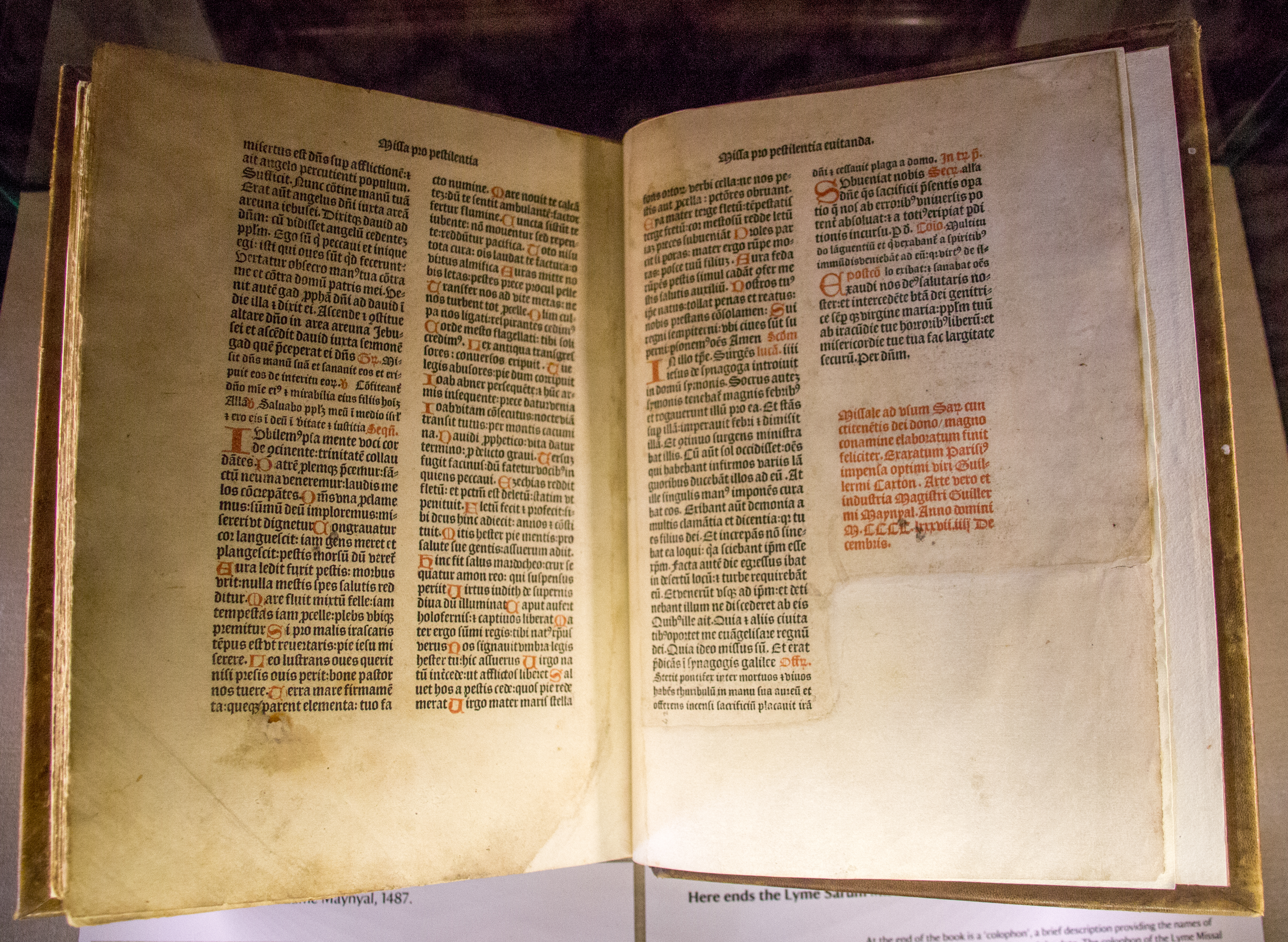
Inside the book

The book was published by William Caxton in 1487 and printed for him in Paris by Guillaume Maynal. This is the first known instance of an English publisher contracting out work to a foreign printer. This copy of the missal has been in the northwest of England since at least 1508. Another copy of this edition is said to have been in the shrine of Edward the Confessor in Westminster Abbey, but this has not survived. The book was in the possession of the Legh family, when in 1549, during the reign of Edward VI, it was banned. It was "hidden away" in Lyme Park for many years, and rediscovered in 1874 by William Brenchley Rye, a scholar from the British Museum, when he was visiting the house. It was then displayed in a glass case "for scholars and family visitors to admire". When the Legh family left the house in 1946, it remained in their possession, and was held for safe-keeping in the John Rylands Library in Manchester. It is "one of only two Caxtons in the world which has remained in the ownership of a single family for 500 years". It is also the only near-complete copy of this edition of the missal to survive; there are fragments only of another copy that is held in Durham University.

== Present day ==
The missal was purchased in 2008 by the National Trust at a cost of £465,000, with support from the Heritage Lottery Fund, The Art Fund, and other organisations. It is on display in the library of Lyme Park. Associated with it is an interactive digital display. With this the visitor can "turn the pages" of the book, using touch-screen technology, and also listen to passages from the book being sung.
