= Leghs of Adlington =

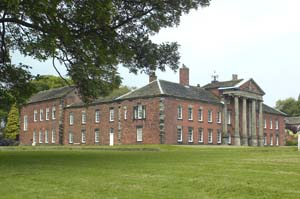
- Adlington Hall, Cheshire
- Language: English

Origin
- Region of origin: North West England

Other names
- Variant forms: Lee, Legh, Leigh

The Leghs of Adlington were established by Robert de Leigh who inherited the lordship of the manor of Adlington from his mother Elena de Corona (née de Baguley). His father, John de Leigh, who was lord of the manor of Over Knutsford and seated at Norbury Booths, descended in the male line from the Venable family.

Robert de Leigh, lieutenant to Sir Thomas de Ferrers “Lieutenant of the Prince’s Bachelor”, was a Riding-Forester of the Forest of Macclesfield, Bailiff of the Hundred of Macclesfield and a Justice in Eyre for Cheshire.

Robert de Legh, the second in succession, was one of the Black Prince's Esquires. Sir Robert Legh the third in succession was knighted during the reign of Richard II. He was twice Sheriff of Cheshire. He fought at the Battle of Shrewsbury in 1403 against Henry IV. Robert Legh the fourth in succession was preparing to take part in the Battle of Agincourt but died of pestilence ten days before the battle.

Some years after the dissolution of the monasteries, Thomas Legh the tenth in succession acquired the rights to the manor of Prestbury, together with the advowson of the parish church and tithes. Leghs became patrons of the Living and Lay Rectors of Prestbury as they still are. Thomas Legh served as High Sheriff of Cheshire for 1588/89.

Sir Urian Legh was knighted for military services by taking Cádiz in 1596. He was appointed High Sheriff in 1613.

Thomas Legh (1593–1644), the twelfth in succession, was twice High Sheriff of Cheshire (1629 and 1642) and a Colonel in the Royalist Army during the Civil War. He lost Adlington Hall in December 1642 but regained it later. In February 1644 the house was again besieged. This time it had to be surrendered to the Parliamentarians in order to prevent severe damage. It was not returned to the family until 1656 after heavy fines had been paid.

Thomas Legh (1614–1687), the thirteenth in succession, was gazetted Colonel of Militia and appointed High Sheriff in 1662 in recognition of his services to the Stuarts. The next three in succession were also Colonels of Militia and High Sheriffs, John (the fifteenth) also serving as MP for Bodmin from 1715 to 1722. On the death of Charles Legh in 1781 the direct male line expired but the succession continued through Charles' niece Elizabeth Rowlls who assumed the surname of Legh by Royal Sign Manual.

== Succession of the Legh family of Adlington ==
- Robert de Leigh (1308–1370)
- Robert de Legh (1330–1382)
- Sir Robert Legh (1362–1408)
- Robert Legh (1386–1415)
- Robert Legh (1410–1478)
- Robert Legh (1428–1487)
- Thomas Legh (1452–1519)
- George Legh (1497–1529)
- Thomas Legh (1527–1548)
- Thomas Legh (1547–1601)
- Sir Urian Legh (1566–1627)
- Thomas Legh (1593–1644)
- Thomas Legh (1614–1687)
- Thomas Legh (1644–1691)
- John Legh (1668–1739)
- Charles Legh (1697–1781)
- Elizabeth Rowlls Legh (1728–1806)
- Richard Crosse Legh (1754–1822)
- Thomas Legh (1795–1829)
- Charles Richard Banastre Legh (1821–1888)
- Caroline Mary Florence Legh (1873–1940)
- Cynthia Combermere Legh (1896–1983)
- Charles Francis Legh (1922–1992)
- Camilla Jane Corona Legh (1960–)

== See also ==
- Leighs of West Hall, High Legh
- Leghs of Lyme
- Earl of Chichester (1644 creation)
- Baron Leigh
- Leigh baronets
