= Oliphant baronets =

Dormant baronetcy in the Baronetage of Nova Scotia

The Oliphant Baronetcy, of Newton, was a title in the Baronetage of Nova Scotia. It was created on 28 July 1629.

== Background ==
The Oliphants of Newton and the Lords Oliphant were the two most influential branches of the Oliphant family in the 17th century.

Sir William Oliphant of Newton (Lord Newton), Lord Advocate of Scotland was father of the first baronet. Sir William Oliphant is credited with introducing the process of cross-examining witnesses in court, rather than the previous process of extracting testimonials from witnesses, which were then read out in court.

Their principal seat was at Newton, in the parish of Forgandenny.

The Complete Baronetage states that this baronetcy (in Nova Scotia was purchased on 28 July 1629; was sealed on 24 August 1629, is destined to heirs male whatsoever and is not evident in the Register of the Great Seal.

== Oliphant Baronets, of Newton (1629) ==
- Sir James Oliphant, 1st Baronet (1571–1648)
- Sir James Oliphant, 2nd Baronet (1612–1659)
- Sir George Oliphant, 3rd Baronet (died c. 1701)

Thereafter the baronetcy devolved to the heir of the first baronet's grandfather, Thomas Oliphant of Freeland, whose ancestry has not yet been proved. In consequence, the baronetcy is listed as dormant as of August 2010.
