= Leghs of Lyme =

English gentry family

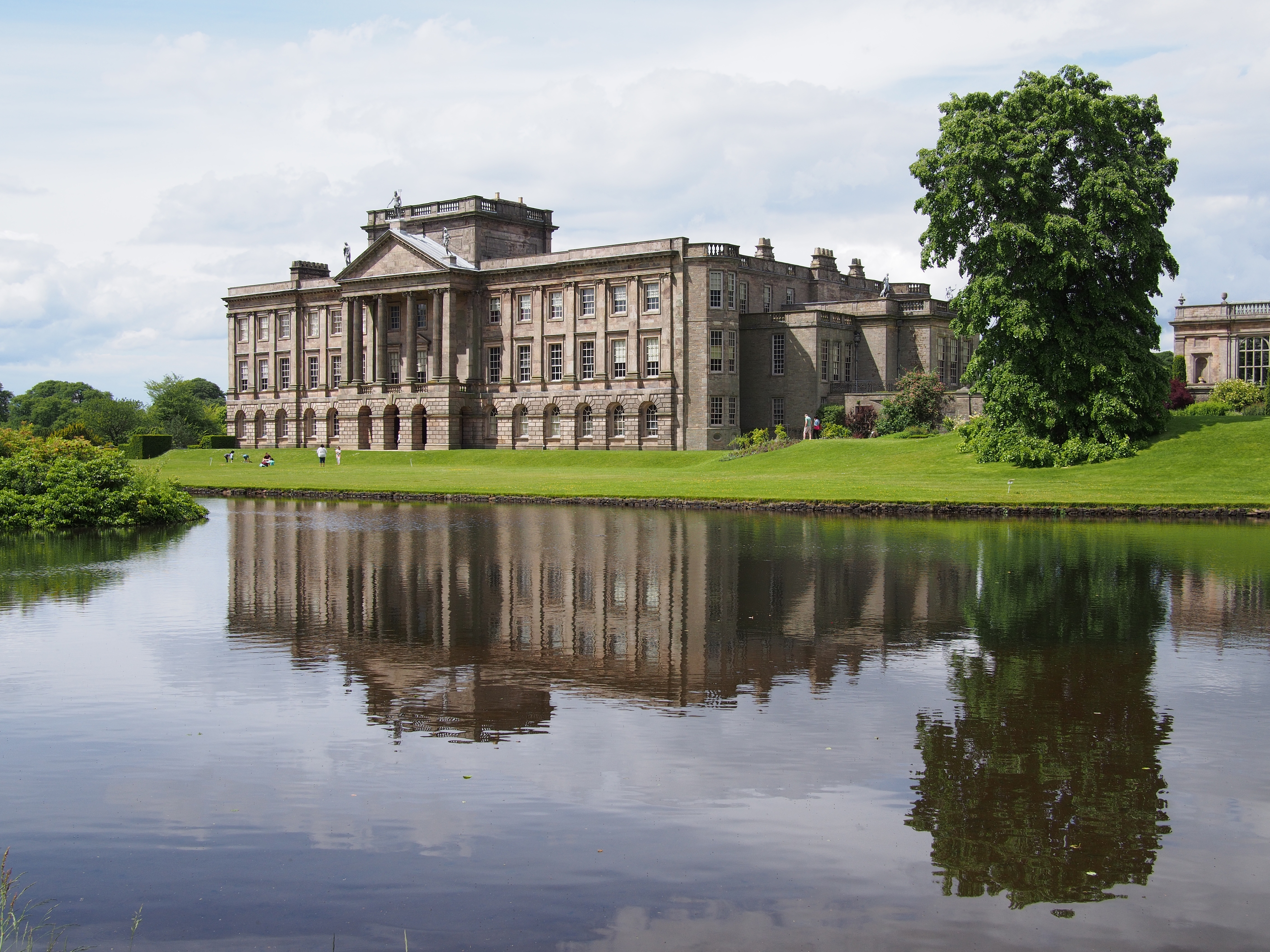
- Lyme Park, the former seat of the Legh family
- Language: English

Origin
- Region of origin: Cheshire, North West England

Other names
- Variant forms: Lee, Legh, Leigh

The Leghs of Lyme were a gentry family seated at Lyme Park in Cheshire, England, from 1398 until 1946, when the stately home and its surrounding parkland were donated by the 3rd Lord Newton to The National Trust.

Since the Middle Ages various spellings of this ancient surname have been used: Legh, a Lee, Leghe, Leigh and Leyghe; there were also variations on Peter, eg. Piers and Peers, the family's most oft-used given name. The first Sir Piers Legh, of Lyme, was knighted in 1397 and assumed as a coat of arms those of his mother, Matilda de Norley, in lieu of his ancient patrilineal Leigh arms.

For ease of distinguishing between the earlier generations, it became customary to append a Roman numeral to the various Leghs' names; in this case the numbering system is as used in The National Trust Handbook for Lyme Park.

== List of the Leghs of Lyme ==
- Sir Piers Legh (beheaded 1399) was the second son of Robert Legh of Adlington by his second wife, Matilda, daughter and heiress of Sir Thurstan de Norley of Norley in Lancashire. In 1388, Piers married Margaret d'Anyers, the daughter of Sir Thomas d'Anyers, who fought with the Black Prince at the Battle of Crécy (Sir Thomas had recovered the Black Prince's Standard and was rewarded with an annuity of 40 Marks a year drawn on the Black Prince's Cheshire estates, his Royal Manor of Frodsham, which could be redeemed for land of an equivalent value). Sir Thomas's son (also Sir Thomas Danyers aka Daniell) died in 1353, a year before his father, so his young daughter, Margaret d'Anyers, became sole heiress of the Cheadle Hulme manor; as an orphan heiress she was married first to Sir John Radclyffe (who died without issue), then to Sir John Savage of Clifton with whom she had a son, John, and two daughters, Elizabeth and Blanche. After being widowed in 1386 for a second time, she married Piers de Legh on 4 January 1388; he was 28 years of age whilst his bride Dame Margaret Savage (née d'Anyers) was almost 40 as she was said to be 80 at her death in 1428. Dame Margaret Legh and her husband eventually claimed her father's reward from Richard II in 1398 receiving about 1,400 acres at Lyme Handley near Disley in Cheshire; Sir Piers Legh, having been knighted in 1397 by Richard II, was executed at Chester in 1399 after Henry Bolingbroke's coup, later being buried at St Michael's Church, Macclesfield.
- Sir Piers Legh (died 16 June 1422 at Meaux), injured at Agincourt in 1415, died from wounds sustained in a later conflict; he too was buried at Macclesfield Church, where the Legh Chapel was consecrated in his memory.
- Sir Piers Legh (4 June 1415 – November 1478) was knighted in 1460 by the Duke of York following the Battle of Wakefield.
- Piers Legh (died 1468 – before his father).
- Sir Piers Legh (1455–1527) was knighted between the Battles of Hutton Field in 1481 and Bosworth in 1485 and was further rewarded by appointment as Seneschal for Blackburnshire. He endowed a Chantry Chapel at Disley, having been ordained as a priest in 1512. The memorial brass to him and his wife Ellen (or Eleanor) in St Oswald's Church, Winwick, is unique in combining the military and the sacred.
- Sir Piers Legh (died 11 August 1527) was wounded at the Battle of Flodden. He was buried at St Oswald's Church, Winwick.
- Sir Piers Legh (died 6 December 1589), the builder of Lyme Hall, was knighted at Leith in 1544. High Sheriff of Lancashire in 1550, he was buried at Winwick.
- Piers Legh (died 10 August 1570 – before his father).
- Sir Piers Legh (1563–1636), MP for Wigan, knighted at Greenwich in 1598 and was buried at Winwick.
- Peter Legh (1588–1624), lived at Bradley Hall in Lancashire. He married in 1620 Anne Savile, 2nd daughter of Sir John Savile (cr. Lord Savile, 1627) and died before his father.
- Peter Legh (1623–1642), elected MP for Newton 1640 and was killed in a duel in 1642.
- Francis Legh (died 2 February 1643), married in 1630 Anne Fenner before succeeding his nephew to Lyme Park in 1642, but died without issue the following year and was buried at Winwick.
- Richard Legh (1634–1687) was a minor when he succeeded to the family estate during the Civil War period. Under the English Commonwealth he was elected Member of Parliament for Cheshire and after the Restoration was appointed Lord Lieutenant of Cheshire as well as a Deputy Lieutenant of Lancashire. Richard Legh planted the first avenues of trees in the park at Lyme, and was buried at Winwick.
- Peter Legh (died 1744) was imprisoned in the Tower of London in 1694 and charged with high treason twice but acquitted on both occasions. He then employed the Italian architect Giacomo Leoni to carry out a major restoration of the hall. He was buried at Winwick.
- Peter Legh (1706 – 20 May 1792) was a nephew of the above. He was born at Bank Hall, Bretherton and married Martha Bennet of Salthrop House, Wiltshire. They lived at Lyme. They had two sons (both died young) and two daughters, who were unable to inherit the Lyme estates. Peter and Martha are both buried at St Mary's Church, Disley.
- Colonel Thomas Peter Legh (1754 – 7 August 1797), MP for Newton 1780, Colonel of the Lancashire Light Dragoons 1794, succeeded his uncle as lord of the manors of Newton-in-Makerfield, Haydock, Dalton and Bradley in Lancashire and of Cheadle and Lyme Handley in Cheshire. Colonel Legh, who was appointed a KJ just before his death at Leith Fort near Edinburgh, died unmarried 1797, leaving three sons and four daughters by seven different ladies, and was buried at St Oswald's Church, Winwick.
- Thomas Legh (died 8 May 1857), son of the above, was a Fellow of the Royal Society and travelled widely. He carried out the first survey of Petra and wrote about the slave trade in Egypt. At Lyme he commissioned Lewis Wyatt to carry out extensive alterations to the house. He was buried at Disley.
- William Legh (19 December 1828 – 15 December 1898) was a Member of Parliament before being elevated as the 1st Baron Newton for political services in 1892. He created the sunken Dutch garden and added stables and other buildings to the estate.
- Thomas Legh, 2nd Baron Newton (18 March 1857 – 21 March 1942) was also a Member of Parliament, then Paymaster General and Assistant Under-Secretary of State for Foreign Affairs during the First World War. Lady Newton (née Evelyn Bromley-Davenport) and her husband were responsible for many alterations to the gardens at Lyme.
- Richard Legh, 3rd Baron Newton (1888–1960) donated Lyme Park to The National Trust in 1946.
- Peter Legh, 4th Baron Newton (1915–1992) was also a politician.
- Richard Thomas Legh, 5th Baron Newton (born 11 January 1950) lives at Laughton Park in Sussex.
- Hon. Piers Richard Legh (born 25 October 1979) is heir apparent to the Newton title.

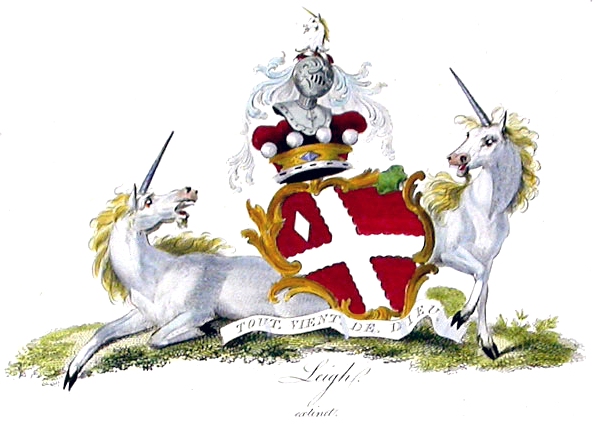
The heraldic achievement of the Barons Leigh, differenced arms from those of the Leghs of Lyme.

== See also ==
- Baron Leigh
- Burke's Landed Gentry
- Earl of Chichester (1644 creation)
- Leghs of Adlington
- Leigh baronets
- Leighs of West Hall, High Legh
