= William Oliphant, Lord Newton =

Scottish judge

Sir William Oliphant, Lord Newton (1551–1628) was a Scottish judge.

Admitted as an advocate in 1577, he became an Advocate Depute in 1604. He gained favour of James VI by throwing up his brief for the six ministers in 1606. He was appointed a lord of session from 1611 to 1626, with the judicial title Lord Newton and was Lord Advocate from 1612 to 1626. He was appointed a member of new High Commission court in 1615. He was responsible for the present procedure of examining witnesses in court. He seems to have been involved in witch trials.

He died on 13 April 1628 and was buried in Greyfriars Kirkyard in Edinburgh.

== Life ==
Sir William Oliphant of Newton, advocate, son of William Oliphant of Newton, in the parish of Forgrandenny, Perthshire, was admitted to the Scottish bar on 20 October 1577. Five years later (14 October 1582) he was appointed a justice-depute (Pitcairn, i. 101), and in 1604 he acted as advocate-depute for Sir Thomas Hamilton, king's advocate. In the same year a commission was chosen to discuss the question of union with England, Oliphant was added as one 'best affected fittest for that eirand' (Reg. of Privy Council, vii. 457). He was a commissioner (1607) for reforming the teaching of grammar in schools, which had fallen into disrepute by the 'curiositie of divers maisters . . . taking upon thaim efter their fantesie to teache such grammar as pleases them' (Acts of Parl. iv. 374). His reputation at the bar meanwhile advanced; he appears in many of the leading cases (Pitcairn; Reg. of Privy Council, passim). He was chosen, with Thomas Craig, to defend the six ministers in January 1606; but he gave up his brief on the eve of the trial, on the plea, as Balmerino explained, that the king's promise of leniency, provided they acknowledge their offense, not justify their obstinacy (ib. vii. 478). He thereby won the king's favour, and was soon amply rewarded. In 1608 the council, in a letter to the king, named him first of four who were 'the most learned and best experienced of their profession' (Denmylne MSS. A. 2. 39. No. 66). In November 1610 he appears as a justice of the peace for Perthshire and the stewartries of Strathearn and Menteith (Reg. of Privy Council, ix. 78).

He was elevated to the bench in January 1611, in succession to Sir David Lindsay of Edzell, one of the lords-ordinary. Thereupon the privy council wrote a long letter to the king, in which they declared how popular had been the election of one 'whose bipast cariage is an hes bene onlie forceable to hold him in your Majesteis rememberance' (ib. ix. 592). Next year (19 June) he was nominated in a royal letter as king's advocate, in succession to Hamilton, who had been appointed clerk of register. On 9 July following be was admitted of the privy council as lord-advocate, and was knighted by the chancellor in conformity with a mandate from the king. He retained his seat on the bench (ib. ix. 403). Parliament ratified his appointment in October, and granted a pension of 1,000l. for life, which the king had intimated to the council in a letter of 8 April 1611.

He played a prominent part in the political stir of the closing years of James's reign; the sederunts of the privy council show that he was present at almost every meeting. In December 1612 he was one of a select commission of five for the settling of controversies between burgh and landward justices of the peace (ib. ix. 503); in August 1613 a commissioner for the trial of the Jesuit Robert Philip, in December 1614 for the trial of Father John Ogilvie [q.v.], and in June 1015 for that of James Mofiat; in December 1615 he was appointed a member of the reconstructed court of high commission, and in May 1616 one of the committee to report on the book 'God and the King,' which James had determined to introduce into Scotland as he had done in England and Ireland. On 17 Dec. 1016 Oliphant was elected a member of the financial committee of the council known as the commissioners for the king's rents (ib. x. 676; Balfour, Annals, ii. 65). As kind's advocate he appears in all the great political trials, notably those of Gordon of Gicht and Sir James Macdonald of Islay. He had the care, too, of putting into force the new acts against the sale of tobacco and the carrying of hagbuts; and the numerous prosecutions which he carried out testify to his activity. The parliament of 1021 ratified the possession of the family lands to him and his sons James and William in fee (Acts of Parl. iv. 662). Charles I's proclamation prohibiting the holding of an ordinary seat in the court of session by officers of state and nobles compelled him to leave the bench (February 1020). He died on 1 (13?) April 1628, and was buried in the Greyfriars' churchyard at Edinburgh. To Oliphant is due the present procedure of examining witnesses in the hearing of the jury. Hitherto evidence had been taken in the trial of one Listen, accused of the murder of a certain John Mayne (Pitcairn).

== Bibliography ==
- Register of the Privy Council of Scotland; Acts of Parliament of Scotland
- Retours; Denmylne MSS. in Advocates' Library, passim
- Brunton and Hair's Senators of the College of Justice
- Pitcairn's Criminal Trials Anderson's Oliphants in Scotland, 1879, p. 156.

== Family background ==
Sir William Oliphant was the son of Thomas Oliphant of Freeland. He was father of Sir James Oliphant, Lord Newton, 1st Baronet (died 1648) – see also Oliphant baronets. The article is contradictory, in the text above it states his father is William Oliphant of Newton, in the parish of Forgrandenny, Perthshire

Legal offices
Preceded by Sir Thomas Hamilton	Lord Advocate; 1612–1626	Succeeded by Sir Thomas Hope, 1st Baronet
