= Piers Legh (soldier) =

English soldier (1389–1422)

Sir Piers Legh II
- Born: 1389; Disley, Cheshire, England
- Died: 16 June 1422 (aged 32–33); Paris, France
- Cause of death: Wounds sustained from the Siege of Meaux
- Resting place: Macclesfield, Cheshire, England
- Occupation: Soldier
- Known for: Battle of Agincourt
- Spouse: Joan Haydock
- Children: Piers Legh, Blanche de Legh, Margaret Leigh
- Parent(s): Peter Legh (c. 1320–1399) and Margaret Danyers (1347–1428)

Sir Piers Legh (1389 – 16 June 1422), also known as Sir Piers de Legh and Peers Legh, was the second generation of the Leghs of Lyme as the son of Peter Legh and Margaret d'Anyers, Lady Savage.

He was wounded in the Battle of Agincourt on 25 October 1415. His mastiff stood over him and protected him for many hours through the battle. The dog returned to Legh's home and was the foundation of the Lyme Hall Mastiffs. Five centuries later, this pedigree figured prominently in founding the modern English Mastiff breed. An old stained glass window remains in the drawing room of Lyme Hall portraying Sir Piers and his devoted mastiff.

He was injured again in action in 1422 and died as a result of his wounds in Paris. He was buried at St Michael's Church, Macclesfield in the Legh Chapel, which had been built to receive his body.
