= Baron Newton =

Barony in the Peerage of the United Kingdom

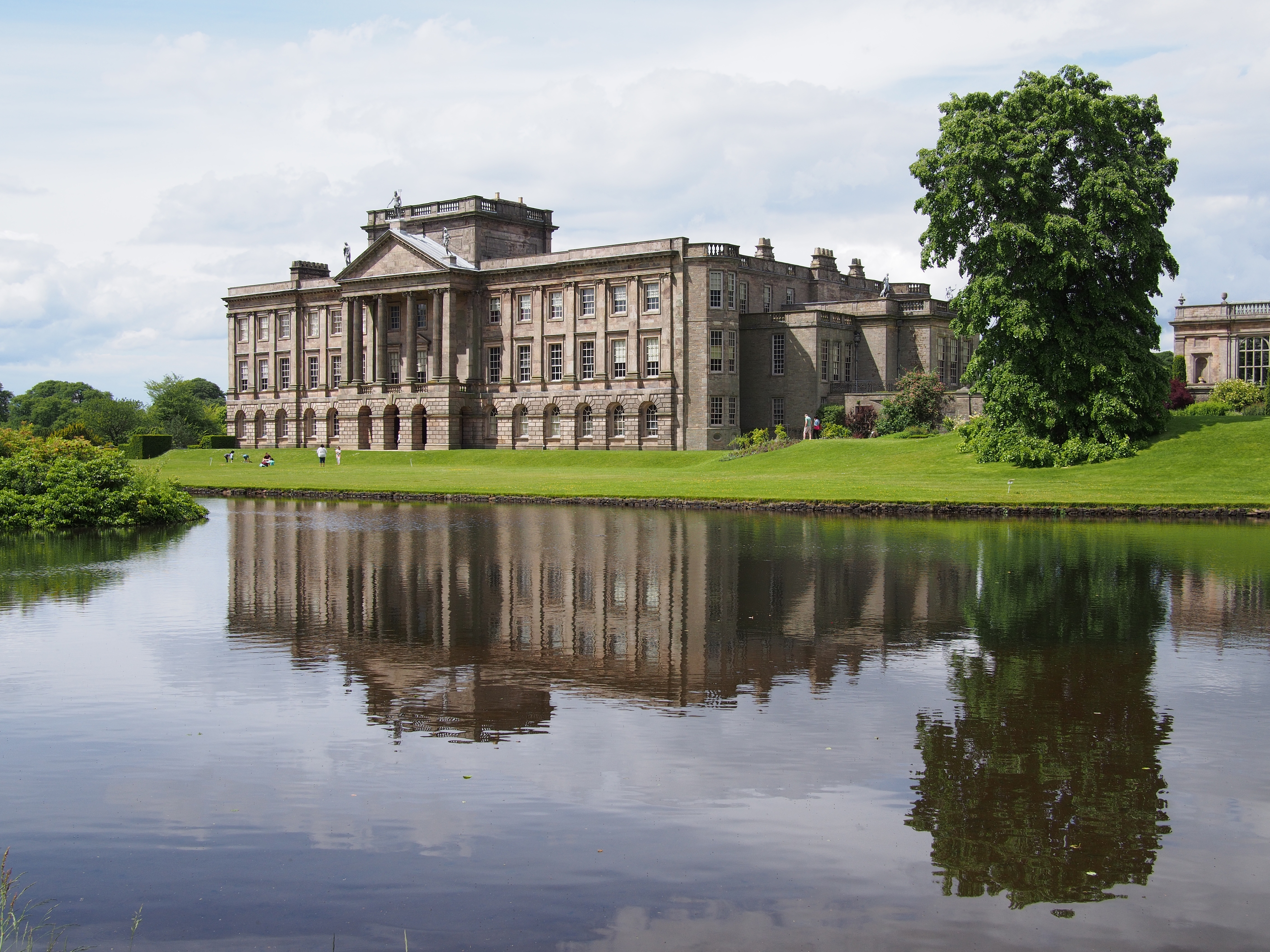
Lyme Park, the former seat of the Legh family

Baron Newton, of Newton-in-Makerfield in the County Palatine of Lancaster, is a title in the Peerage of the United Kingdom. It was created in 1892 for the Conservative politician William Legh, who had earlier represented Lancashire South and Cheshire East in the House of Commons.

== Overview ==
Both his son, the second Baron, and his great-grandson, the fourth Baron, were Conservative government ministers. As of 2017 the title is held by the latter's eldest son, the fifth Baron, who succeeded in 1992.

The family seat is Laughton Park Farm, near Lewes, East Sussex. The ancestral seat was Lyme Park, near Disley, Cheshire. It was given to the National Trust in 1946 by the third Baron Newton.

== Barons Newton (1892) ==
- William John Legh, 1st Baron Newton (1828–1898)
- Thomas Wodehouse Legh, 2nd Baron Newton (1857–1942)
- Richard William Davenport Legh, 3rd Baron Newton (1888–1960)
- Peter Richard Legh, 4th Baron Newton (1915–1992)
- Richard Thomas Legh, 5th Baron Newton (b. 1950)

The heir apparent is the present holder's son Piers Richard Legh (b. 1979)

== Arms ==
Coat of arms of Baron Newton
Crest Issuant out of a ducal coronet Or a ram's head Argent armed Or in the mouth a laurel slip Vert the whole debruised by a pallet wavy Azure. Escutcheon Gules a cross engrailed Argent in the chief point on an inescutcheon Sable semee of estoiles an arm in armour embowed of the second the hand Proper holding a pennon Silver all within a bordure wavy Or. Supporters Two mastiffs Proper collared Sable. Motto En Dieu Est Ma Foi (In God Is My Faith)
