= James Oliphant, Lord Newton =

Scottish judge and Senator of the College of Justice

James Oliphant, Lord Newton of Newton and Muirhouse (1571–1648) was a 17th-century Scottish judge and Senator of the College of Justice.

== Life ==
He was born in 1571, the son of William Oliphant, Lord Newton and his wife Katharine Blair.

In November 1629 he was elected a Senator of the College of Justice and took the title previously used by his father Lord Newton. He took the place of Alexander Hay, Lord Fosterseat.

In 1629 he purchased a heritable baronetcy in Nova Scotia. He died in 1648.

== Family ==
He married Marjory Graham, daughter of Patrick Graham of Inchbrakie. They had two sons James (later 2nd baronet) and George Oliphant of Muirhouse, and one daughter, Lilias.

Following Marjory's death he married Giles Moncrief (sic). They had no more children, and after the death of Oliphant she married Rev James Bennet of Auchtermuchty.

Baronetage of Nova Scotia
New creation	Baronet (of Newton); 1629–1648	Succeeded by James Oliphant
