= Richard Legh, 5th Baron Newton =

British peer (born 1950)

Richard Thomas Legh, 5th Baron Newton (born 11 January 1950) is a Baron in the United Kingdom.

== Family ==
The fifth Lord Newton is the son of the Conservative politician, Peter Legh, MP for Petersfield from 1951 until he succeeded to the barony in 1960. In 1978 he married Rosemary Whitfoot Clarke, younger daughter of Herbert Clarke: they had one son and one daughter. He succeeded to his father’s barony in 1992.

== Education ==
Legh was educated at Eton and Christ Church, Oxford.

== Career ==
He was a solicitor at May May & Merrimans from 1976 to 1979; and a General Commissioner for Income Tax from 1983. He was a Member of Wealden District Council from 1987 to 1999; and a member of the Sussex Downs Conservation Board from 1992 to 1998.

== Arms ==
Coat of arms of Richard Legh, 5th Baron Newton

Crest
Issuant out of a ducal coronet Or a ram's head Argent armed Or in the mouth a laurel slip Vert the whole debruised by a pallet wavy Azure.
Escutcheon
Gules a cross engrailed Argent in the chief point on an inescutcheon Sable semee of estoiles an arm in armour embowed of the second the hand Proper holding a pennon Silver all within a bordure wavy Or.
Supporters
Two mastiffs Proper collared Sable.
Motto
En Dieu Est Ma Foi (In God Is My Faith)

Peerage of the United Kingdom
Preceded by Peter Legh	Baron Newton; 1992–present	Incumbent
