= Richard Legh, 3rd Baron Newton =

British diplomatic attaché

Richard William Davenport Legh, 3rd Baron Newton DL, JP (18 November 1888 – 11 June 1960) was a Baron in the Parliament of the United Kingdom.

== Life ==
Legh was the son of the British diplomat and Conservative politician Thomas Wodehouse Legh, 2nd Baron Newton PC, DL His grandfather, William Legh, 1st Baron Newton DL, was a British Conservative politician who was raised to the peerage as Baron Newton, of Newton-in-Makerfield in the County Palatine of Lancaster.

Newton was educated at Eton and Christ Church, Oxford. He was an attaché for the British Embassy at Istanbul then Vienna. He served during the First World War with the Lancashire Hussars. Later he was Honorary Colonel of the 7th Battalion, The Cheshire Regiment. During the Second World War he served at the War Office.

In 1914, he married Helen Meysey-Thompson (d. 1958), 2nd daughter of the 1st Baron Knaresborough: they had three sons, including Peter who succeeded to his father's title. His wife died in 1958.

== Arms ==
Coat of arms of Richard Legh, 3rd Baron Newton

Crest
Issuant out of a ducal coronet Or a ram's head Argent armed Or in the mouth a laurel slip Vert the whole debruised by a pallet wavy Azure.
Escutcheon
Gules a cross engrailed Argent in the chief point on an inescutcheon Sable semee of estoiles an arm in armour embowed of the second the hand Proper holding a pennon Silver all within a bordure wavy Or.
Supporters
Two mastiffs Proper collared Sable.
Motto
En Dieu Est Ma Foi (In God Is My Faith)

Peerage of the United Kingdom
Preceded by Thomas Legh	Baron Newton; 1942–1960	Succeeded by Peter Legh
