= William Legh, 1st Baron Newton =

British politician (1828–1898)

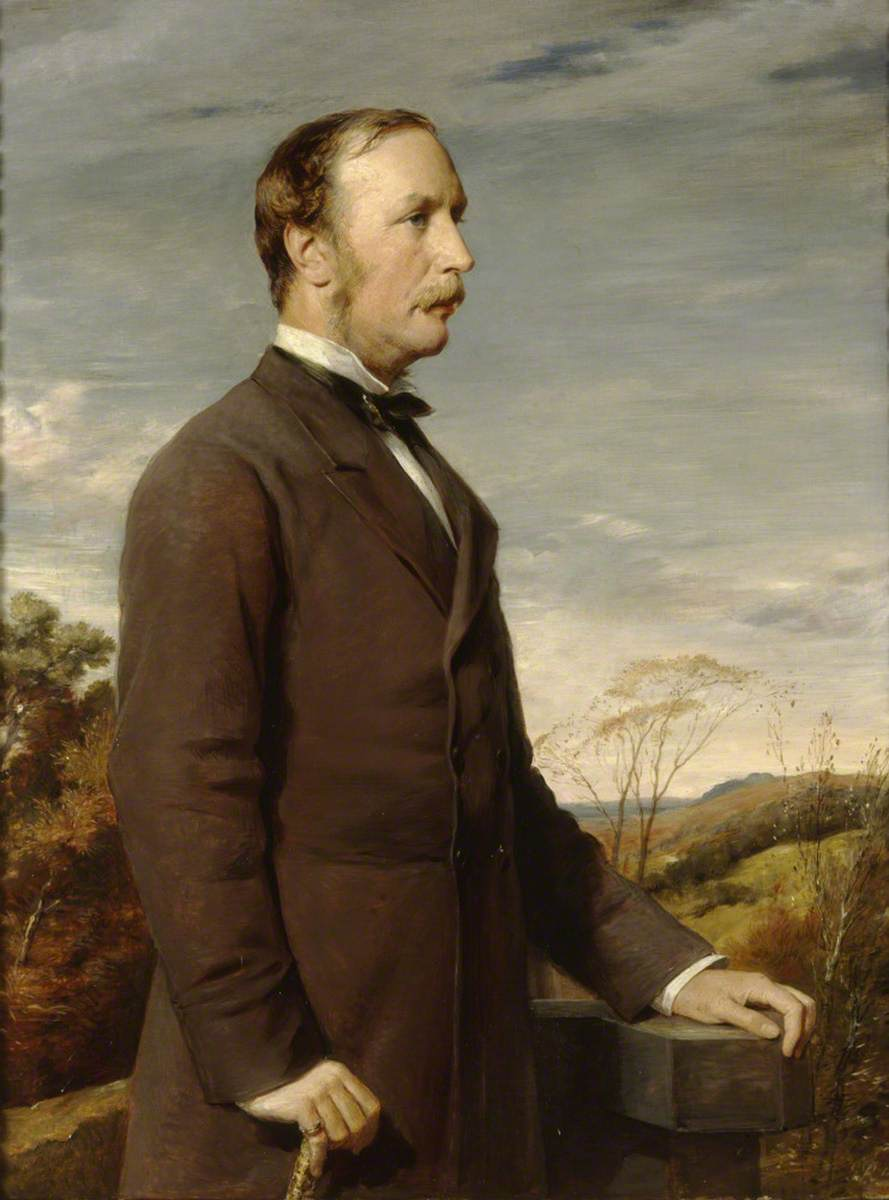
William John Legh (1828–1898), 1st Baron Newton

William John Legh, 1st Baron Newton, DL (19 December 1828 – 15 December 1898), was a British Conservative politician and Volunteer officer.

== Early life ==
Legh was the son of William Legh.

== Career ==
He sat as a Member of Parliament for Lancashire South from 1859 to 1865 and for Cheshire East from 1868 to 1885. On 27 August 1892 he was raised to the peerage as Baron Newton, of Newton-in-Makerfield in the County Palatine of Lancaster.

On 5 May 1866 he was commissioned as Lieutenant-Colonel to command the 4th Administrative Battalion, Cheshire Rifle Volunteer Corps, and after his period of command he was appointed Honorary Colonel of the part-time battalion on 25 January 1873.

== Personal life ==
Lord Newton married Emily Jane, daughter of the Venerable Charles Nourse Wodehouse, Archdeacon of Norwich, in 1856.

He died in December 1898, aged 69, and was succeeded in the barony by his eldest son Thomas, who became a government minister. His great-grandson Peter Legh, 4th Baron Newton, was also a Conservative politician and government minister. Lady Newton died in 1901.

== Arms ==
Coat of arms of William Legh, 1st Baron Newton

Crest
Issuant out of a ducal coronet Or a ram's head Argent armed Or in the mouth a laurel slip Vert the whole debruised by a pallet wavy Azure.
Escutcheon
Gules a cross engrailed Argent in the chief point on an inescutcheon Sable semee of estoiles an arm in armour embowed of the second the hand Proper holding a pennon Silver all within a bordure wavy Or.
Supporters
Two mastiffs Proper collared Sable.
Motto
En Dieu Est Ma Foi (In God Is My Faith)

== Notes ==
Parliament of the United Kingdom
| Preceded by William Brown; John Cheetham | Member of Parliament for Lancashire South; 1859 – 1865; With: Algernon Fulke Egerton 1859–1865; Charles Turner 1861–1865 (representation increased to three members 1861) | Succeeded by Algernon Fulke Egerton; William Ewart Gladstone |
| New constituency | Member of Parliament for Cheshire East; 1868 – 1885; With: Edward Christopher Egerton 1868–1869; William Cunliffe Brooks 1869–1885 | Constituency abolished |
Peerage of the United Kingdom
| New creation | Baron Newton; 1892 – 1898 | Succeeded by Thomas Legh |
