= Peter Legh, 4th Baron Newton =

British Conservative politician

The Right Honourable The Lord Newton

Minister of State for Education and Science
- In office 1 April 1964 – 16 October 1964
- Monarch: Elizabeth II
- Preceded by: Sir Edward Boyle
- Succeeded by: The Lord Bowden
Ministerial offices 1957-64
Parliamentary Secretary to the Ministry of Health
In office 6 September 1962 – 1 April 1964
Monarch	Elizabeth II
Preceded by	Edith Pitt
Succeeded by	The Marquess of Lothian
Deputy Chief Whip of the House of Lords Captain of the Yeomen of the Guard
In office 28 October 1960 – 6 September 1962
Monarch	Elizabeth II
Preceded by	The Earl of Onslow
Succeeded by	The Viscount Goschen
Deputy Chief Whip of the House of Commons Treasurer of the Household
In office 16 January 1959 – 21 June 1960
Monarch	Elizabeth II
Preceded by	Martin Redmayne (Deputy); Hendrie Oakshott (Treasurer)
Succeeded by	Sir Edward Wakefield, Bt.
Vice-Chamberlain of the Household
In office 17 September 1957 – 16 January 1959
Monarch	Elizabeth II
Preceded by	Sir Richard Thompson, Bt.
Succeeded by	Sir Edward Wakefield, Bt.
Lord Commissioner of the Treasury
In office 13 June 1955 – 17 September 1957
Monarch	Elizabeth II
Preceded by	Hendrie Oakshott
Succeeded by	Richard Brooman-White

Member of the House of Lords Lord Temporal
- In office 12 June 1960 – 16 June 1992; Hereditary Peerage
- Preceded by: The 3rd Lord Newton
- Succeeded by: The 5th Lord Newton

Member of Parliament for Petersfield
- In office 25 October 1951 – 11 June 1960
- Preceded by: Sir George Jeffreys
- Succeeded by: Joan Quennell

Personal details
- Born: Peter Richard Legh; 6 April 1915 London, England
- Died: 16 June 1992 (aged 77) Droxford, England
- Party: Conservative
- Education: Christ Church, Oxford

Peter Richard Legh, 4th Baron Newton (6 April 1915 – 16 June 1992), was a British Conservative politician who held junior ministerial positions during the 1950s and 1960s.

== Early life ==
Newton was born in Chelsea, London, in 1915, the son of Richard Legh, 3rd Baron Newton and Helen Winifred Meysey-Thompson, daughter of Henry Meysey-Thompson, 1st Baron Knaresborough. His grandfather Thomas Wodehouse Legh, 2nd Baron Newton was also a Conservative politician and served as Paymaster General during the First World War

Newton was educated at Eton and Christ Church, Oxford, and served in the Second World War as a Major in the Grenadier Guards.

== Political career ==
After the war Newton was a member of the Hampshire County Council from 1949 to 1952 and from 1954 to 1955. In 1951 he was elected Member of Parliament for Petersfield, and served in the Conservative administrations of Churchill, Eden and Macmillan as Parliamentary Private Secretary to the Financial Secretary to the Treasury John Boyd-Carpenter from 1952 to 1953, as an Assistant Government Whip from 1953 to 1955, as a Lord Commissioner of the Treasury from 1955 to 1957, as Vice-Chamberlain of the Household from 1957 to 1959 and as Treasurer of the Household from 1959 to 1960. In 1960 Newton succeeded his father as 4th Baron Newton and took his seat in the House of Lords, causing a by-election in Petersfield which was won by the Conservative candidate, Joan Quennell.

He continued to serve under Harold Macmillan and later Alec Douglas-Home as Captain of the Yeomen of the Guard and Assistant Chief Whip in the House of Lords from 1960 to 1962, as Joint Parliamentary Secretary to the Ministry of Health from 1962 to 1964 and as Minister of State for Education and Science in 1964.

== Personal life ==
In 1948 Newton married Priscilla Warburton, daughter of Captain John Egerton Warburton and widow of Major William Matthew Palmer, Viscount Wolmer, son and heir of Roundell Palmer, 3rd Earl of Selborne. They had two sons. Lord Newton died in Droxford on 16 June 1992, aged 77. He was succeeded in the Barony by his elder son Richard Thomas Legh.

== Arms ==
Coat of arms of Peter Legh, 4th Baron Newton

Crest
Issuant out of a ducal coronet Or a ram's head Argent armed Or in the mouth a laurel slip Vert the whole debruised by a pallet wavy Azure.
Escutcheon
Gules a cross engrailed Argent in the chief point on an inescutcheon Sable semee of estoiles an arm in armour embowed of the second the hand Proper holding a pennon Silver all within a bordure wavy Or.
Supporters
Two mastiffs Proper collared Sable.
Motto
En Dieu Est Ma Foi (In God Is My Faith)

Parliament of the United Kingdom
Preceded by Sir George Jeffreys	Member of Parliament for Petersfield; 1951–1960	Succeeded by Joan Quennell
Political offices
Preceded by Richard Thompson	Vice-Chamberlain of the Household; 1957–1959	Succeeded by Edward Wakefield
Preceded by Hendrie Oakshott	Treasurer of the Household; 1959–1960	Succeeded by Edward Wakefield
Preceded by Martin Redmayne	Deputy Chief Whip of the House of Commons; 1959–1960	Succeeded by Edward Wakefield
Preceded by The Earl of Onslow	Captain of the Yeomen of the Guard; 1960–1962	Succeeded by The Viscount Goschen
Preceded by Bernard Braine	Parliamentary Secretary to the Ministry of Health; 1962–1964; With: Bernard Braine 1962–1964; The Marquess of Lothian 1964	Succeeded by Bernard Braine; The Marquess of Lothian
Party political offices
Preceded by Martin Redmayne	Conservative Deputy Chief Whip in the House of Commons; 1959–1960	Succeeded by Edward Wakefield
Preceded by The Earl of Onslow	Conservative Deputy Chief Whip in the House of Lords; 1960–1962	Succeeded by Viscount Goschen
Peerage of the United Kingdom
Preceded by Richard Legh	Baron Newton; 1960–1992	Succeeded by Richard Legh
