= Thomas Legh, 2nd Baron Newton =

British diplomat and Conservative politician

The Lord Newton
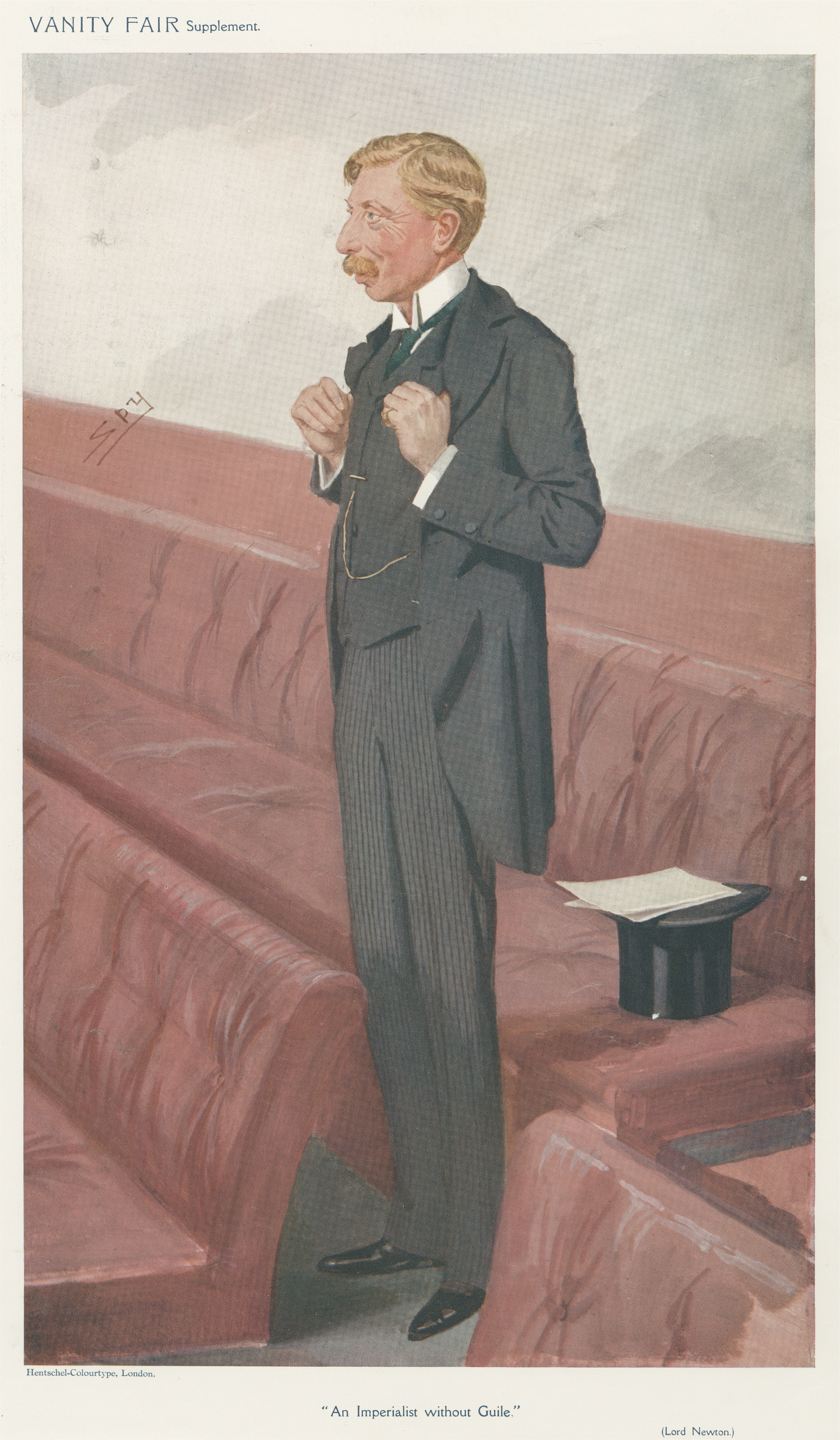
- "An Imperialist without Guile", caricature by Spy in Vanity Fair, 1908.

Paymaster General
- In office 9 June 1915 – 18 August 1916
- Monarch: George V
- Preceded by: The Lord Strachie
- Succeeded by: Arthur Henderson

Assistant Under-Secretary of State for Foreign Affairs
- In office 10 December 1916 – 10 January 1919
- Monarch: George V
- Preceded by: New office
- Succeeded by: Office abolished

Personal details
- Born: 18 March 1857
- Died: 21 March 1942 (aged 85)
- Party: Conservative
- Spouse: Evelyn Davenport (m. 1880; died 1931)
- Education: Christ Church, Oxford

Thomas Wodehouse Legh, 2nd Baron Newton PC, DL (18 March 1857 – 21 March 1942) was a British diplomat and Conservative politician who served as Paymaster General during the First World War.

== Background and education ==
Newton was the son of William Legh, 1st Baron Newton, and Emily Jane Wodehouse, daughter of the Venerable Charles Nourse Wodehouse, Archdeacon of Norwich. The Legh family had been landowners in Cheshire for centuries. Newton was educated at Eton and Christ Church, Oxford.

== Political and administrative career ==
In 1879 he entered the Diplomatic Service and served as an attaché at the British Embassy in Paris from 1881 to 1886. The latter year he was elected to the House of Commons as Member of Parliament for his home constituency of Newton, a seat he held until 1898, when he succeeded his father as 2nd Baron Newton and took his seat in the House of Lords. He was appointed a deputy lieutenant of Cheshire on 23 February 1901. In 1915 Prime Minister H. H. Asquith appointed him Paymaster General, with special responsibility for representing the War Office in Parliament when the Secretary of State for War was unable to attend. The same year he was admitted to the Privy Council.

In 1916 Lord Newton became Assistant Under-Secretary of State for Foreign Affairs, and was put in charge of two departments at the Foreign Office, one dealing with foreign propaganda and the other with prisoners of war. In October 1916 he was appointed controller of the newly established Prisoner of War Department, and in this position he negotiated the release of thousands of British prisoners of war.

Lord Newton was appointed a deputy lieutenant for Cheshire in February 1901. He served as an officer in the Lancashire Hussars Imperial Yeomanry, and was promoted to the substantive rank of major on 1 July 1901, before he resigned with the honorary rank of lieutenant-colonel in October 1902.

Lord Newton was also the author of two biographies, one on Richard Lyons, 1st Viscount Lyons, published in 1913, and the other on Henry Petty-Fitzmaurice, 5th Marquess of Lansdowne, published in 1929. In 1941 he published his memoirs, entitled Retrospection.

During the Spanish Civil War, Lord Newton was a strong supporter of General Franco and the fascists, serving on the Friends of National Spain committee.

== Family ==
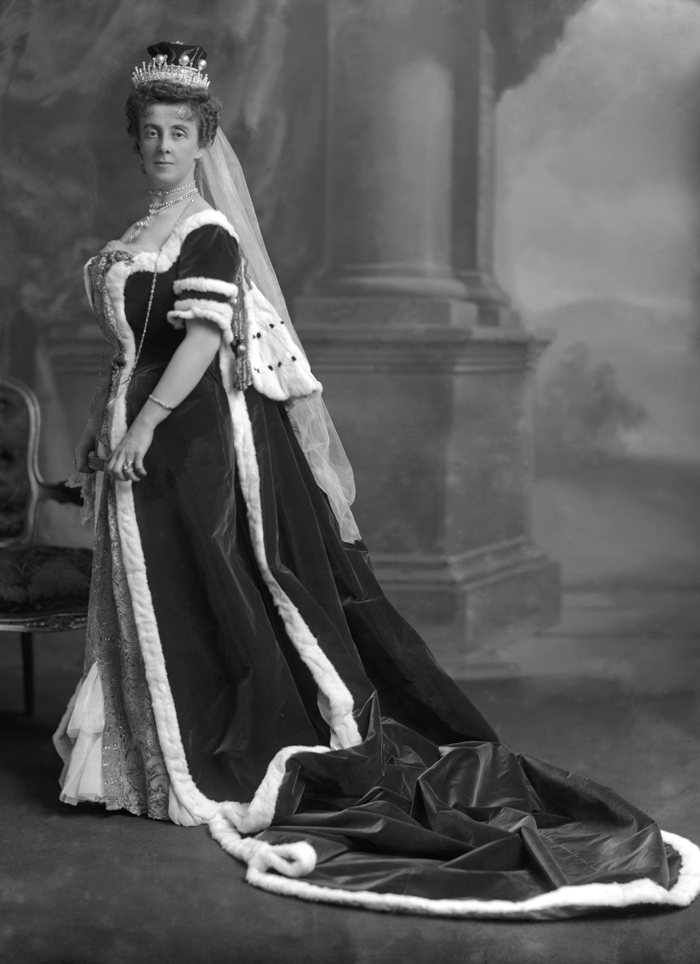
Lady Newton, photographed on 24 June 1902.

Lord Newton married Evelyn Caroline Davenport, daughter of William Bromley-Davenport, in 1880. They had five children, two sons and three daughters. His younger son Sir Piers Legh served as Master of the Household from 1941 to 1953. Lady Newton died in September 1931. Lord Newton survived her by eleven years and died in March, 1942, aged 85. He was succeeded in the barony by his eldest son Richard Legh. The latter's son, Peter Legh, 4th Baron Newton, was also a Conservative politician and government minister.

== Arms ==
Coat of arms of Thomas Legh, 2nd Baron Newton

Crest
Issuant out of a ducal coronet Or a ram's head Argent armed Or in the mouth a laurel slip Vert the whole debruised by a pallet wavy Azure.
Escutcheon
Gules a cross engrailed Argent in the chief point on an inescutcheon Sable semee of estoiles an arm in armour embowed of the second the hand Proper holding a pennon Silver all within a bordure wavy Or.
Supporters
Two mastiffs Proper collared Sable.
Motto
En Dieu Est Ma Foi (In God Is My Faith)

Parliament of the United Kingdom
Preceded by Sir R. A. Cross	Member of Parliament for Newton; 1886–1898	Succeeded by Richard Pilkington
Political offices
Preceded by The Lord Strachie	Paymaster General; 1915–1916	Succeeded by Arthur Henderson
New office	Assistant Under-Secretary of State for Foreign Affairs; 1916–1919	Office abolished
Peerage of the United Kingdom
Preceded by William Legh	Baron Newton; 1898–1942	Succeeded by Richard William Davenport Legh
