= Dorothy Bentinck, Duchess of Portland =

18th-century English noblewoman

Her Grace The Duchess of Portland
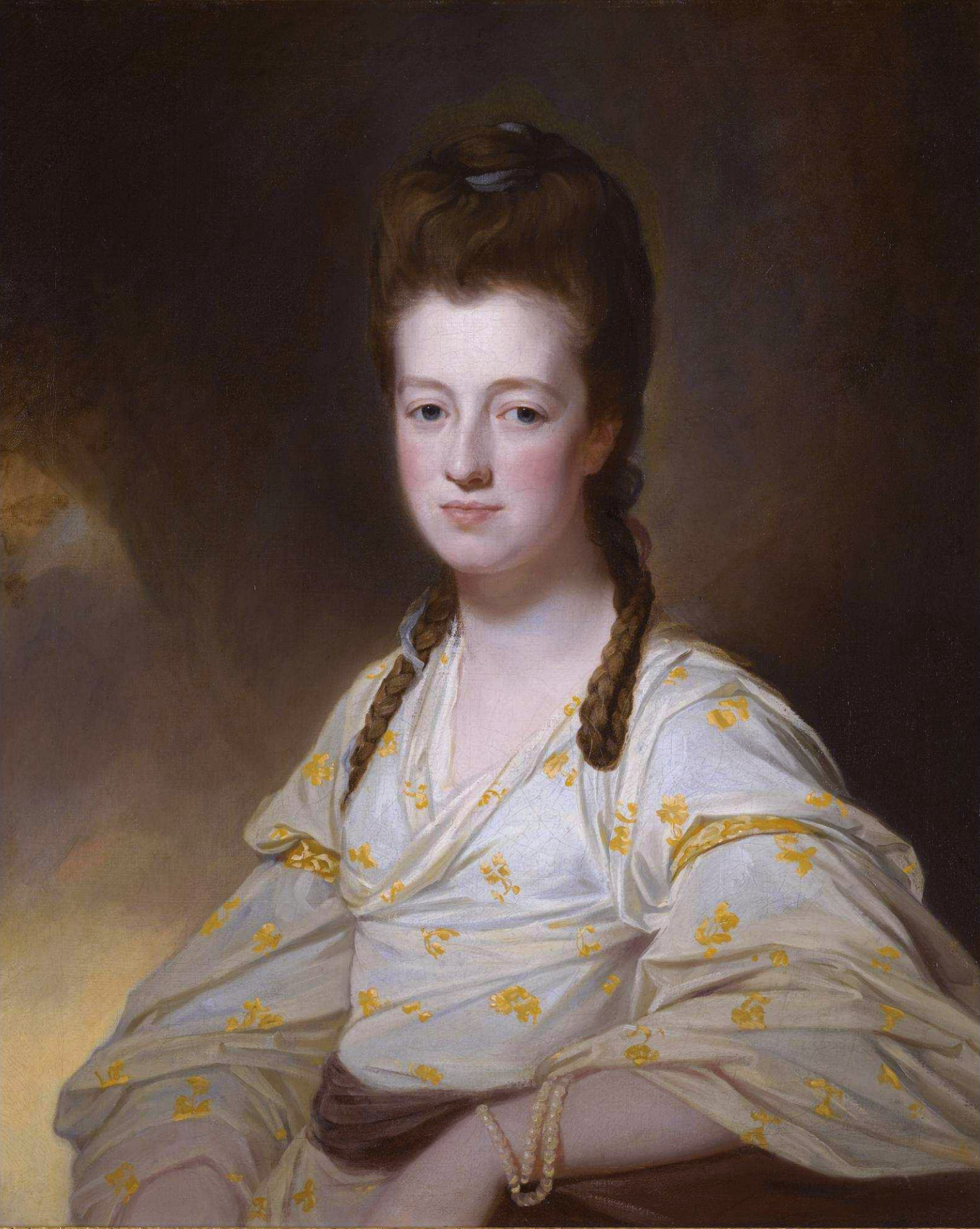
- Dorothy Bentinck, Duchess of Portland by George Romney
- Tenure: 8 November 1766 – 3 June 1794
- Born: 27 August 1750
- Died: 3 June 1794 (aged 43); London, England
- Buried: St Marylebone Parish Church
- Spouse: William Cavendish-Bentinck, 3rd Duke of Portland (m. 1766)
- Issue Detail: 9, including: William Bentinck, 4th Duke of Portland; Lord William Bentinck; Lord Charles Bentinck
- Father: William Cavendish, 4th Duke of Devonshire
- Mother: Charlotte Boyle, 6th Baroness Clifford

Dorothy Bentinck, Duchess of Portland (née Cavendish; 27 August 1750 – 3 June 1794) was Duchess of Portland and the wife of William Cavendish-Bentinck, 3rd Duke of Portland, the Prime Minister of Great Britain.

== Biography ==
Dorothy Cavendish was born on 27 August 1750 to William Cavendish, 4th Duke of Devonshire, the Prime Minister of Great Britain and his wife Lady Charlotte Boyle, 6th Baroness Clifford.

== Marriage and children ==
On 8 November 1766, Cavendish was married to William Cavendish-Bentinck, 3rd Duke of Portland. They had nine children, six of whom survived to adulthood.

- William Bentinck, 4th Duke of Portland (24 June 1768 – 27 March 1854)
- The Right Hon. Lord Charles William Cavendish Bentinck (1 July 1770 – 24 July 1770)
- Unnamed son (25 August 1771 – died young)
- Lord William Henry Cavendish-Bentinck (14 September 1774 – 17 June 1839)
- Lady Charlotte Cavendish-Bentinck (3 October 1775 – 28 July 1862). Married Charles Greville, and they had three sons: Charles Cavendish Fulke Greville, Algernon Greville, and Henry William Greville (1801–1872), and a daughter, Harriet (1803–1870) m. Francis Egerton, 1st Earl of Ellesmere
- Lady Mary Cavendish-Bentinck (13 March 1778 – 6 November 1843)
- Lord Charles Bentinck (3 October 1780 – 28 April 1826). Paternal grandfather of Cecilia Bowes-Lyon, Countess of Strathmore and Kinghorne
- Lord Frederick Cavendish-Bentinck (2 November 1781 – 11 February 1828) married Mary Lowther (d. 1863), daughter of William Lowther, 16 September 1820; had issue: George Cavendish-Bentinck
- A stillborn baby, birthed at Burlington House on 20 October 1786.

== Later life ==
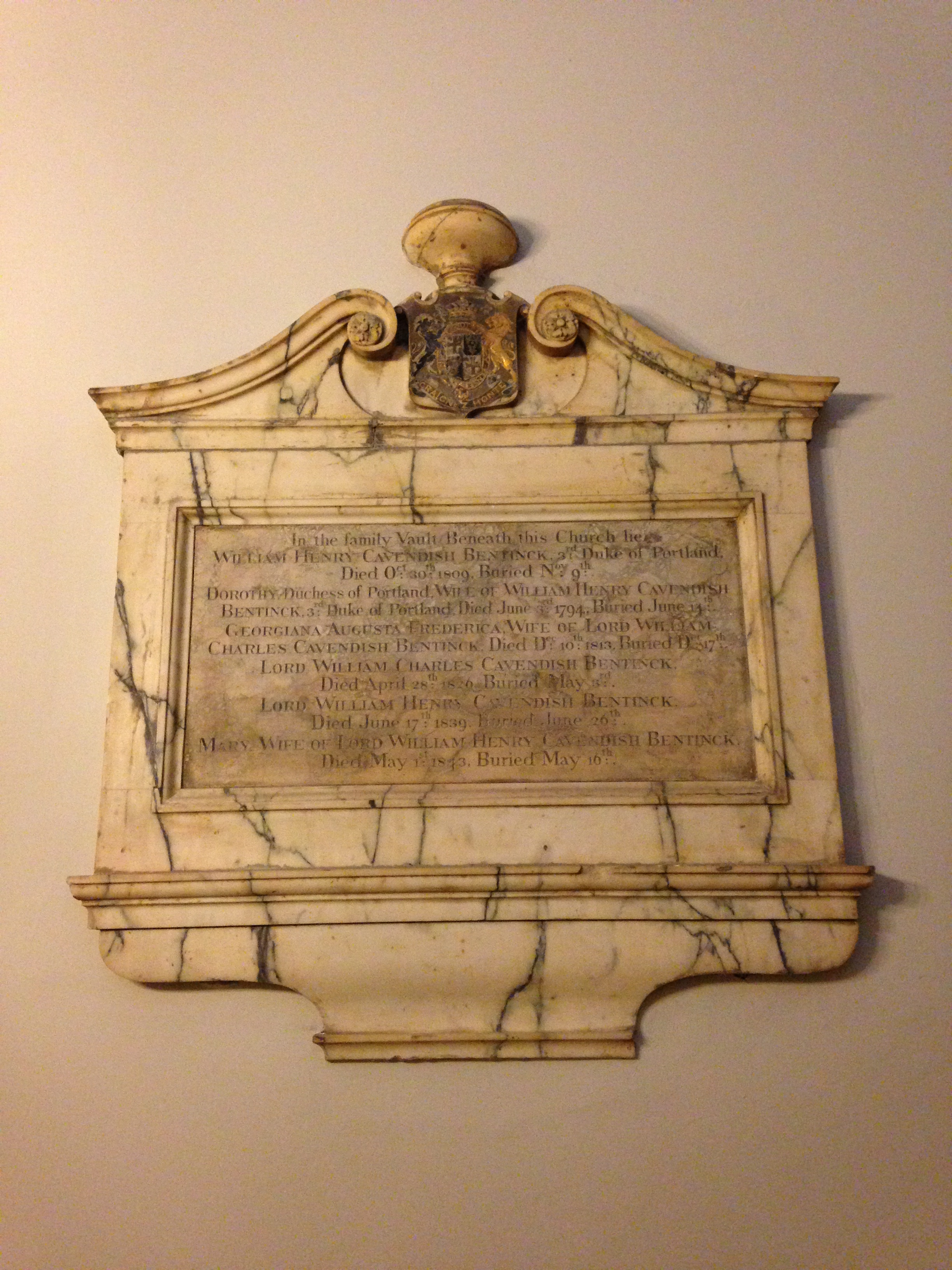
Memorial to the 3rd Duke of Portland and his family at the family vault in St Marylebone Parish Church

The duchess died at her home, Burlington House, Piccadilly, and was buried in St Marylebone Parish Church, Marylebone, London. She “died of a bowel complaint, which she had been subject to for many years, and which terminated in a mortification after a short illness. It was at first suspected, from the violent inflammation in her bowels, that her Grace had eaten water-gruel out of a copper saucepan not properly tinned; but this suspicion is certainly erroneous, as it proved on examination.”

Bentinck was a great-great-great-grandmother of Queen Elizabeth II (see ancestry of Elizabeth II)

== Ancestry ==
Ancestors of Dorothy Bentinck, Duchess of Portland

8. William Cavendish, 2nd Duke of Devonshire
4. William Cavendish, 3rd Duke of Devonshire
9. Hon. Rachel Russell
2. William Cavendish, 4th Duke of Devonshire, Prime Minister of Great Britain
10. John Hoskins
5. Catherine Hoskins
11. Catherine Hale
1. Lady Dorothy Cavendish
12. Charles Boyle, 2nd Earl of Burlington
6. Richard Boyle, 3rd Earl of Burlington
13. Juliana Noel
3. Charlotte Boyle, 6th Baroness Clifford
14. William Savile, 2nd Marquess of Halifax
7. Lady Dorothy Savile
15. Lady Mary Finch

== Arms ==
Coat of arms of Dorothy Bentinck, Duchess of Portland
| Coronet Coronet of a Duke Escutcheon Quarterly 1st & 4th Azure a cross moline Argent 2nd & 3rd Sable three stags' heads cabossed Argent attired Or a crescent for difference (William Cavendish-Bentinck, 3rd Duke of Portland) impaling (William Cavendish, 4th Duke of Devonshire). Supporters Two lions double queued the dexter Or and the sinister Sable. |
