= Fulke Greville (1717–1806) =

English landowner and diplomat

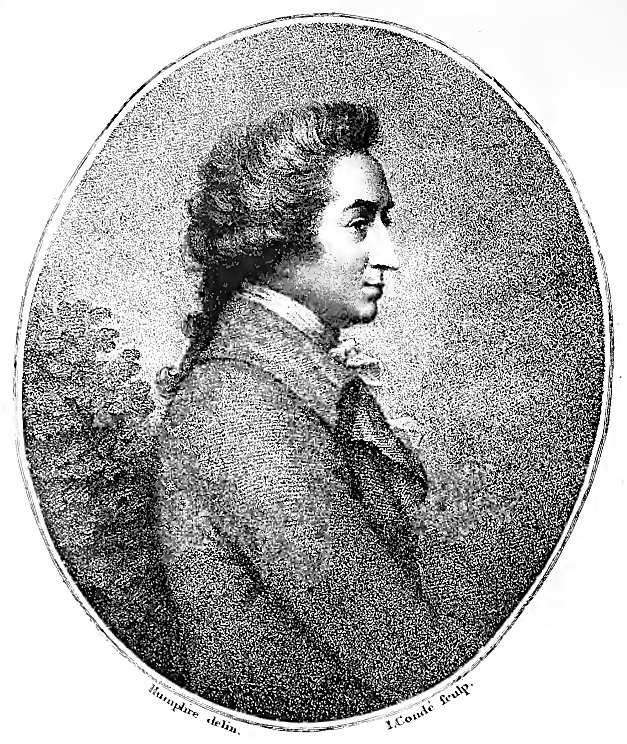
- Born: 1717; London, United Kingdom
- Died: 1806 (aged 88–89)
- Education: Winchester College; Brasenose College; Oxford
- Occupations: Writer, politician, diplomat
- Spouse: Frances Macartney (m. 1747)
- Children: Frances Anne; Henry Francis; Charles
- Writing career
- Genres: Aphorism, poetry
- Notable works: Maxims, Characters and Reflections (1756)

Fulke Greville (1717–1806) of Wilbury House, Newton Toney, Wiltshire, England, was an English landowner, diplomat and writer.

== Life ==
=== Early life and education ===
He was the son of Algernon Greville and Mary Somerset, daughter and coheiress of Lord Arthur Somerset, the youngest son of Henry Somerset, 1st Duke of Beaufort. His father was a son of Fulke Greville, 5th Baron Brooke.

He was schooled at Winchester College from 1727 to 1733. He also attended Brasenose College, Oxford.

=== Family ===
His wife was the poet Frances Greville, daughter and coheir of James Macartney, Irish MP for Longford and Granard and his wife Catherine Coote. They eloped on 26 January 1748. They had several children, including:

- Frances Anne Greville (born November 1748), married John Crewe, later Lord Crewe and was a noted political hostess;
- Capt. William Fulke Greville (8 November 1751 – 1837), father of Fulke Greville-Nugent, 1st Baron Greville and grandfather of George Greville;
- Lt-Col. Henry Francis Greville (10 August 1760 – 13 January 1816);
- Capt. Charles Greville (2 November 1762 – 26 August 1832), father of the diarist Charles Cavendish Fulke Greville, Algernon Frederick Greville, and Henry William Greville.

=== Political and diplomatic career ===
He served as Sheriff of Wiltshire in 1744, and as Member of Parliament for Monmouth Boroughs from 1747 to 1754.

In 1765, he was appointed envoy extraordinary to the Elector of Bavaria and Minister Plenipotentiary to the Imperial Diet of Ratisbon.

== Writing ==
=== Works ===
He was most noted as the author of Maxims, Characters and Reflections (1756), which went through multiple editions.

- 1st ed.: Maxims, Characters and Reflections (London: J. and R. Tonson, 1756).
- 2nd ed.: Maxims, Characters and Reflections, Critical, Satyrical and Moral: With Alterations, Additions and Explanatory Notes (London: J. and R. Tonson, 1757).
- 3rd ed.: Maxims, Characters and Reflections, Critical, Satyrical and Moral: With Alterations, Additions and Explanatory Notes (London: T. Cadell, 1768).

He also wrote poetry, including Soliloquy in a Thatched Building (London: Faulder, 1787), of which the second part was Reflection: A Poem in Four Cantos (London: Robinson, 1790).

=== Reception ===
James Boswell thought that Greville's book of Maxims was "entitled to much more praise than it has received." Hester Thrale wrote that "Greville draws Prose Characters incomparably well; that Man's book of Maxims &c. has not had Credit enough in the World."

== Gallery ==
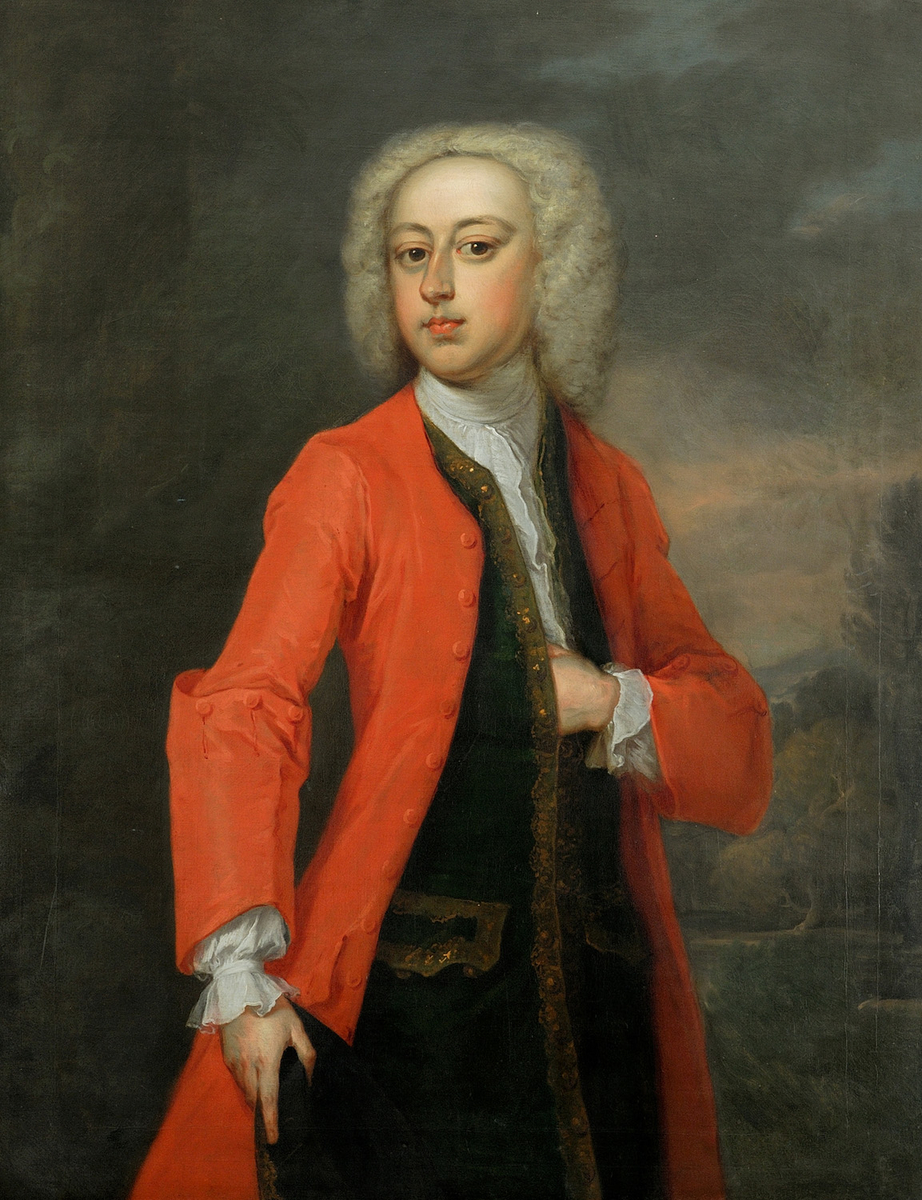
Portrait of Greville at Winchester by Isaac Whood

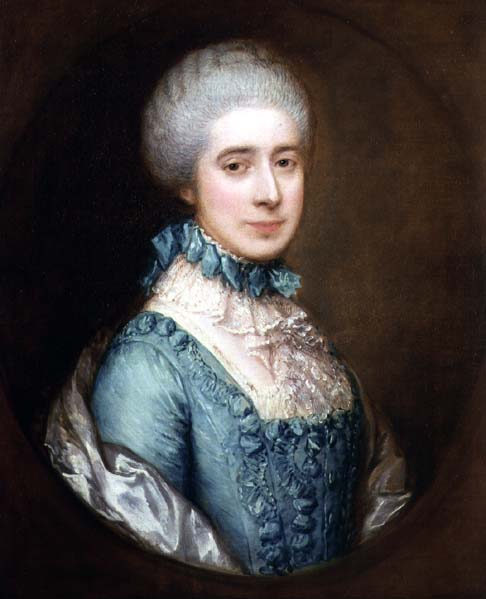
Portrait of his daughter Frances Anne Crewe by Thomas Gainsborough

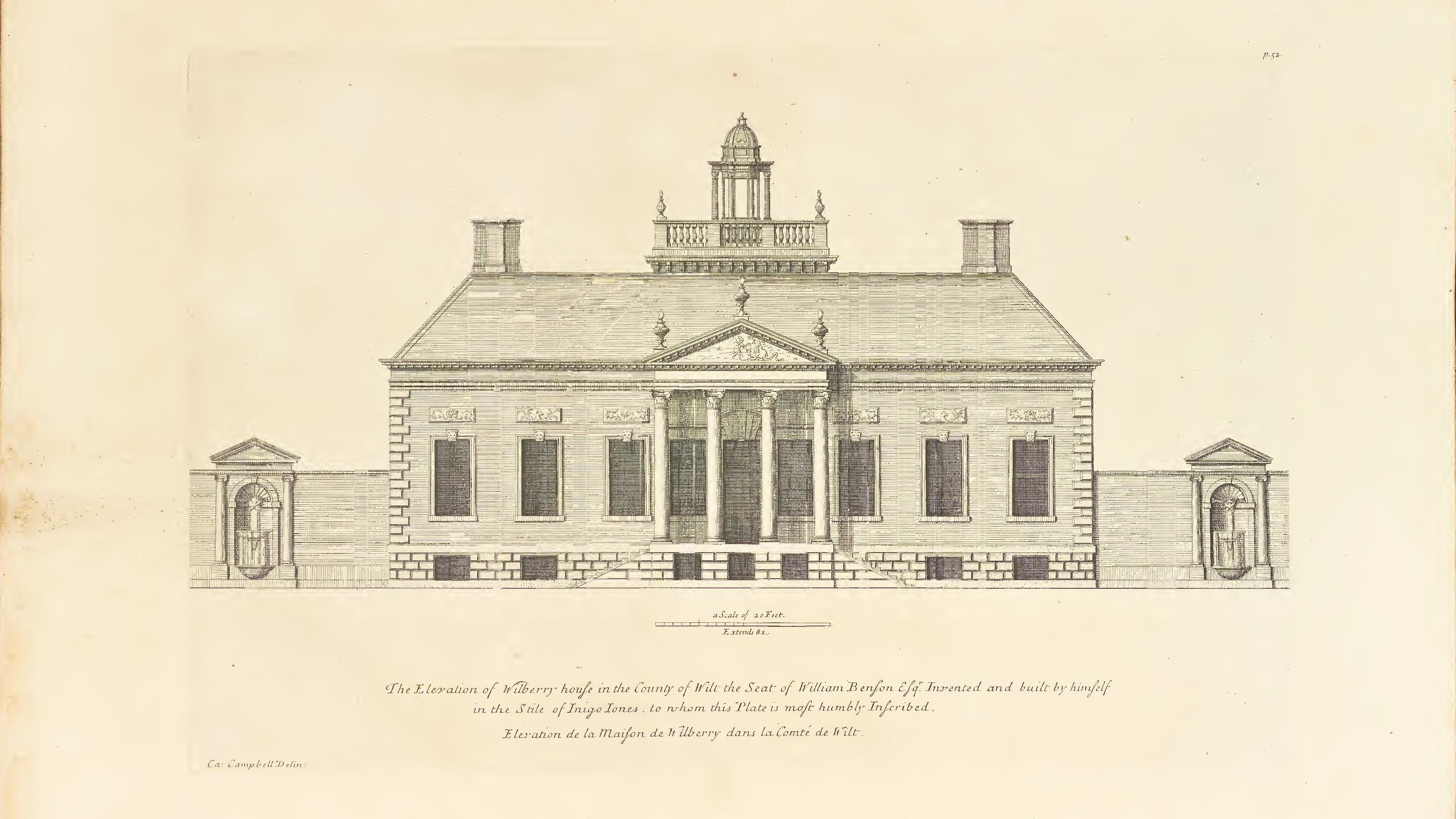
Elevation of Wilbury House from Colen Campbell's Virtruvius Britannicus

Parliament of Great Britain
Preceded by Sir Charles Tynte, 5th Baronet	Member of Parliament for Monmouth Boroughs; 1747–1754	Succeeded by Benjamin Bathurst
Diplomatic posts
Preceded by William Gordon	Envoy to Bavaria; 1764–1769	Succeeded by Lewis de Visme
