= Henry Greville =

Henry Greville may refer to:

- Henry Greville, 3rd Earl of Warwick (1779–1853), British politician
- Henry Gréville (1842–1902), French writer
- Henry William Greville (1801–1872), English diarist
- Henry Francis Greville (1760–1816), British impresario
