= Algernon Greville =

English soldier, cricketer and soldier (1798–1864)

- Born: Algernon Frederick Greville; 29 December 1798
- Died: 15 December 1864 (aged 65); Hillingdon, London, England
- Spouse: Charlotte Cox (m. 1823; died 1841)
- Children: 5
- Parents: Charles Greville (father); Lady Charlotte Cavendish-Bentinck (mother)
- Relatives: Charles Greville (brother); Henry Greville (brother); Frances Greville (aunt); Fulke Greville (paternal grandfather); Frances Greville (paternal grandmother)
- Military career
- Allegiance: Great Britain
- Unit: Grenadier Guards
- Wars: Napoleonic Wars

Algernon Frederick Greville (29 December 1798 – 15 December 1864) was an English soldier, cricketer, and officer of arms who served as private secretary to the Duke of Wellington.

== Early life ==
Greville was born on 29 December 1798. He was the second son of Charles Greville, and Lady Charlotte Cavendish-Bentinck. He was the brother of Charles Cavendish Fulke Greville, the diarist, and of Henry William Greville.

His paternal grandfather was Fulke Greville and descendant of both the Duke of Beaufort and the Baron Brooke. His maternal grandfather was William Cavendish-Bentinck, 3rd Duke of Portland and his maternal great-grandfather was William Cavendish, 4th Duke of Devonshire

== Career ==
Greville made 7 known appearances from 1815 until 1823. He was mainly associated with Marylebone Cricket Club (MCC) but also played for Middlesex and Hampshire.

=== Military career ===
He was commissioned an ensign in the Grenadier Guards on 1 February 1814, and fought with that regiment at Quatre Bras and Waterloo. He was also present at the capture of Péronne, and soon after was appointed aide-de-camp to General Sir John Lambert. He later became ADC to the Duke of Wellington, and served on his staff until the end of the occupation of France.

The Duke made him his private secretary upon being appointed Master-General of the Ordnance in 1819, and he continued to serve in this capacity when Wellington was made commander-in-chief (1827), prime minister (1828), foreign secretary (1834), and commander-in-chief again (1842).

Greville was appointed Bath King of Arms in 1829, and served as secretary to the Cinque Ports while Wellington was Lord Warden.

== Personal life ==
On 7 April 1823, Greville was married to Charlotte Maria Cox (d. 1841), the daughter of R. H. Cox. Before her death in 1841, they were the parents of five children:

- Frances Harriett Greville (1824–1887), who married Charles Gordon-Lennox, 6th Duke of Richmond, a son of Charles Gordon-Lennox, 5th Duke of Richmond and Lady Caroline Paget, in 1843.
- Georgiana Maria Greville (1826–1872)
- Lt. Col. Arthur Charles Greville (1827–1901), a Lieutenant-Colonel in the Scots Guards who died without issue.
- Augusta Mary Greville (1831–1921), who married George Montagu Warren Sandford, MP for Harwich and Maldon, a son of Sir Nathaniel Peacocke, 2nd Baronet, in 1858.
- Lt. Cavendish Hubert Greville (1835–1854), who was killed at the Battle of Inkerman.

His wife died on 10 April 1841. He died over twenty-three years later in Hillingdon on 15 December 1864.

Heraldic offices
Preceded by John Palmer Cullum	King of Arms of the Order of the Bath; 1829–1864	Succeeded by George Grey
