= William Jolliffe (1745–1802) =

British politician (1745-1802)

William Joliffe

Member of Parliament for Petersfield
- In office 1768–1800 Serving with Welbore Ellis (1768–1774) & (1791–1795); Sir Abraham Hume (1774–1780); Thomas Samuel Jolliffe (1780–1787); The Viscount Downe (1787–1790); George North (1790); Marquess of Titchfield (1790–1791); Charles Greville (1795–1796); Hylton Jolliffe (1796–1797); Sir John Sinclair (1797–1800)
- Preceded by: John Jolliffe; Richard Croftes
- Succeeded by: Parliament of the United Kingdom

Member of Parliament for Petersfield
- In office 1801–1802 Serving with Sir John Sinclair (1801–1802)
- Preceded by: Parliament of Great Britain
- Succeeded by: Hylton Jolliffe; William Best

Personal details
- Born: 16 April 1745
- Died: 20 February 1802 (aged 56)
- Party: Tory
- Spouse: Eleanor Hylton
- Parents: John Jolliffe (father); Mary Holden (mother)
- Relatives: Samuel Holden (maternal grandfather); Hylton Jolliffe (son); William George Hylton Jolliffe (grandson)
- Education: Winchester College
- Alma mater: Brasenose College, Oxford

William Jolliffe (16 April 1745 – 20 February 1802) was a British politician who sat in the House of Commons from 1768 to 1802.

== Life ==
He was the eldest son of the politician John Jolliffe and his wife Mary, daughter of Samuel Holden. He was educated at Winchester College and Brasenose College, Oxford.

Jolliffe was elected as Member of Parliament for Petersfield in 1768, a seat controlled by his father, who died in 1771 leaving him a sitting patron. He held it until 1802. He was a Lord of Trade from 1772 to 1779 and Lord of the Admiralty during 1783.

He bought the lease for his residence on King Street in 1772 for what he called "very cheap," but Edward Gibbon described the place as "excellent." After his death, his son Hylton sold it to Henry Francis Greville, who opened it as the Argyll Rooms.

== Family ==
He married Eleanor Hylton, daughter and heir of Sir Richard Hylton, 5th Baronet, and Anne, sister and co-heiress of John Hylton, de jure 18th Baron Hylton. Jolliffe died in February 1802, aged 56, after falling through a trapdoor into a cellar at his home. His wife died the same year. Their grandson William George Hylton Jolliffe became a prominent Conservative politician and was created Baron Hylton in 1866.

== Notes ==
Parliament of Great Britain
Preceded by John Jolliffe; Richard Croftes	Member of Parliament for Petersfield; 1768–1800; With: Welbore Ellis 1768–1774, 1791–1795; Sir Abraham Hume 1774–1780; Thomas Samuel Jolliffe 1780–1787; The Viscount Downe 1787–1790; George North 1790; Marquess of Titchfield 1790–1791; Charles Greville 1795–1796; Hylton Jolliffe 1796–1797; Sir John Sinclair 1797–1800	Succeeded by Parliament of the United Kingdom
Parliament of the United Kingdom
Preceded by Parliament of Great Britain	Member of Parliament for Petersfield; 1801–1802; With: Sir John Sinclair 1801–1802	Succeeded by Hylton Jolliffe; William Best
