= Dorothy Cavendish =

Dorothy Cavendish may refer to:

- Dorothy Bentinck, Duchess of Portland (née Cavendish, 1750–1794), wife of William Cavendish-Bentinck, 3rd Duke of Portland
- Lady Dorothy Macmillan (née Cavendish, 1900–1966), daughter of Victor Cavendish, 9th Duke of Devonshire and wife of Harold Macmillan
