= George Greville =

George Greville may refer to:

- George Greville, 2nd Earl of Warwick (1746–1816), British nobleman and politician
- George Greville, 4th Earl of Warwick (1818–1893), English politician, bibliophile and collector
- Sir George Greville (diplomat) (1851–1937), British diplomat
- George Greville (tennis) (1868–1958), English tennis player
