= Amelia Long =

British watercolor painter

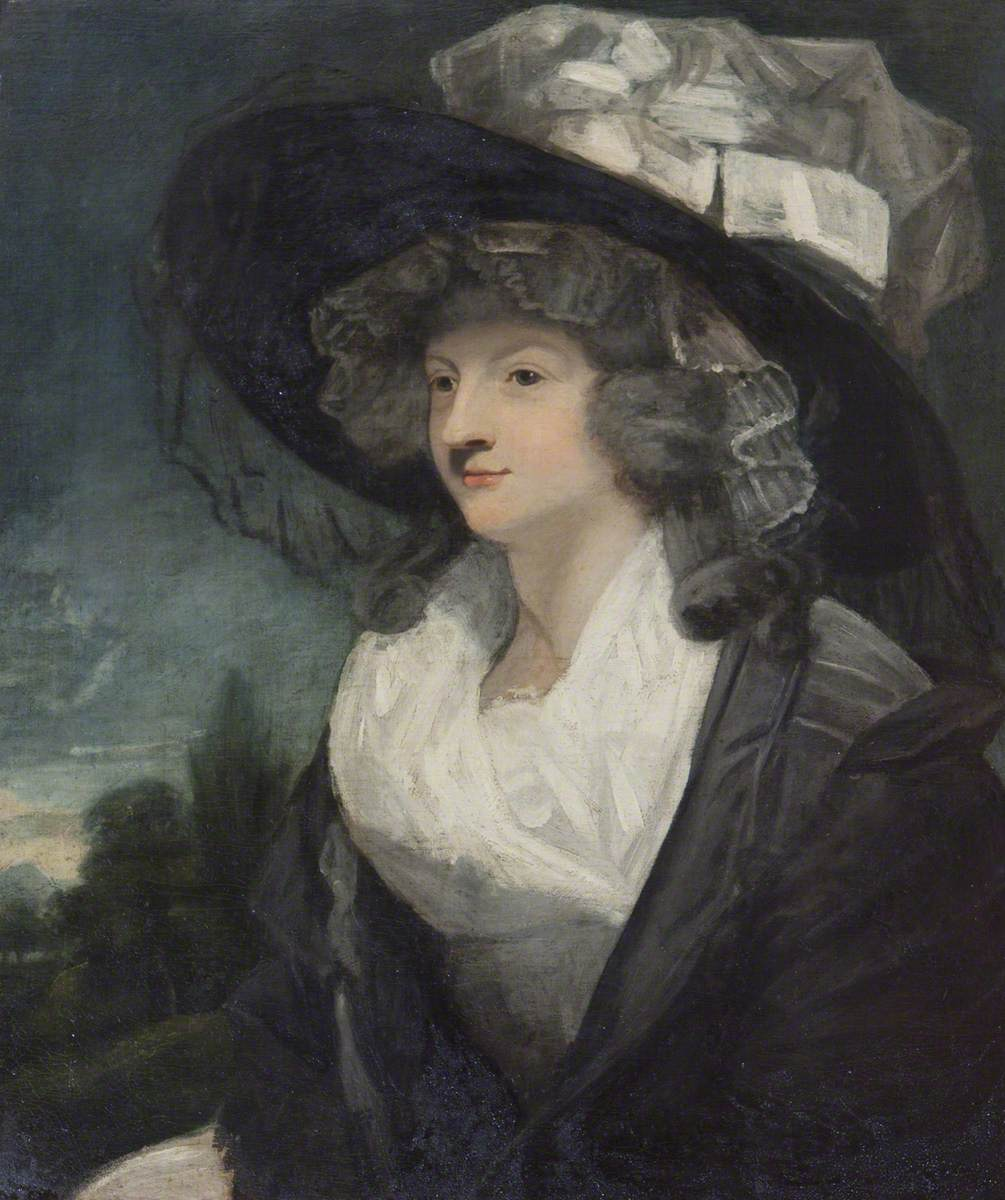
Amelia Long by Joshua Reynolds

Amelia Hannah Long, Lady Farnborough (née Hume; 1772-1837) was a British watercolour painter who specialised in landscapes and botanical subjects.

Born in Wormley in 1772, Long would specialise in watercolours of landscapes depicting the Bromley area in Kent. Long, who was an honorary exhibitor at the Royal Academy from 1807 to 1822 and at the British Institution in 1825, studied with Thomas Girtin and Henry Edridge. Examples of her work are held by Galleries of Scotland National Galleries of Scotland, Dundee Art Gallery, and the British Museum, and Bromley Historic Collections.

Long was the elder daughter of Sir Abraham Hume and Amelia Egerton. Together with her sister Sophia, Countess Brownlow, she was heiress to her parents' art collection.

Well known in her day as a judge of art and a skilled horticulturist, Long largely assisted or was solely the designer, in laying out the gardens at Bromley Hill Place, Kent, a 1760s property she and her husband Charles Long bought in 1801 and enlarged according to their own designs. By 1809, the gardens at Bromley Hill House had two mile-long, picturesque walks, and the present view of St. Paul's Cathedral. Long's paintings of four separate views from the grounds of Bromley Hill House were exhibited between 1811 and 1817. The gardens have since disappeared, but the house, though altered, remains. Lady Long was given an early introduced plant of Wisteria from China, Glycine Sinensis by Thomas Carey Palmer. She grew this wisteria "beautifully trained over an umbrella shaped ironwork frame".

She died at Bromley Hill on 15 January 1837, and was buried at Wormley, Hertfordshire, with an elaborate tomb by Richard Westmacott.

Long’s work was featured in the Courtauld Gallery’s 2026 exhibit A View of One’s Own: Landscapes by British Women Artists, 1760-1860.

== Gallery ==
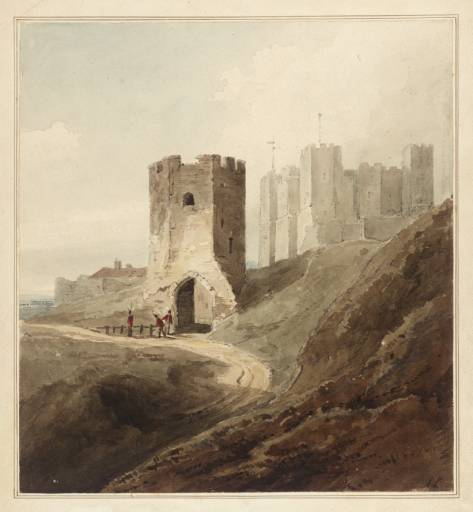
Dover Castle

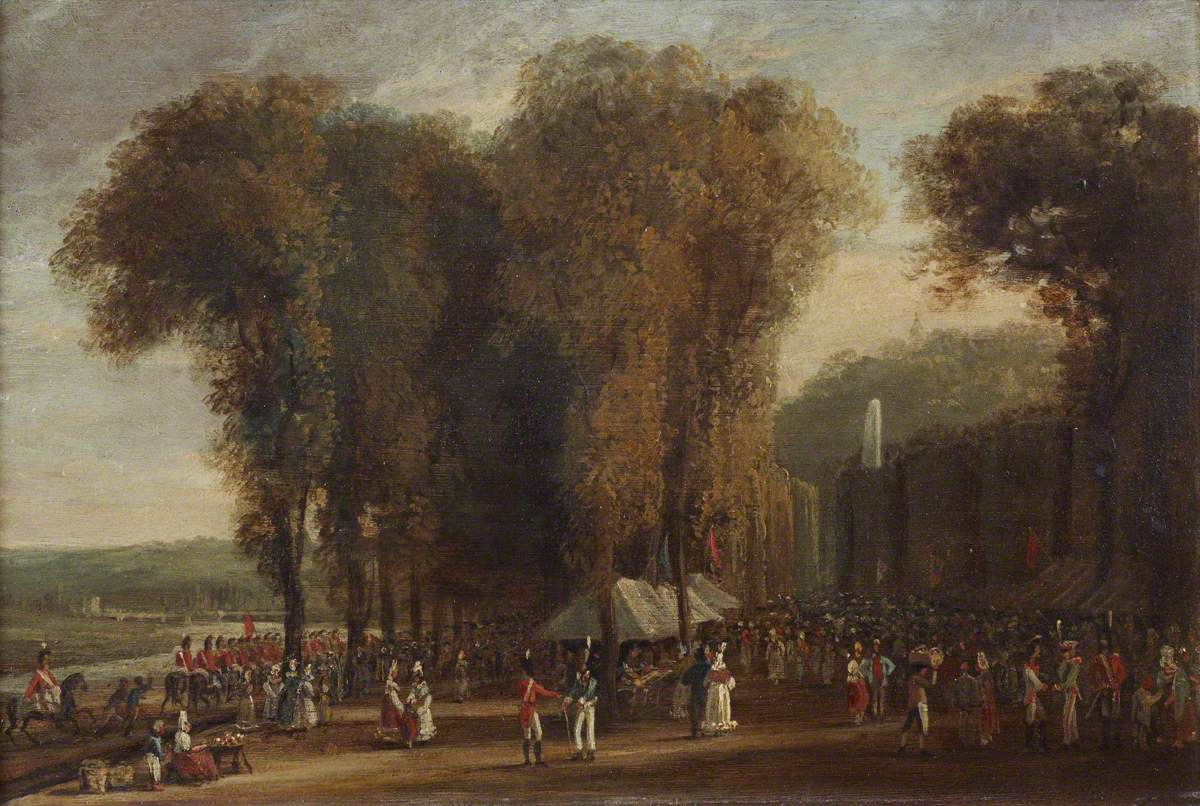
The Garden of St Cloud, Sunday, 10 September 1815
