= Amelia Egerton, Lady Hume =

British horticulturalist

Lady Amelia Hume
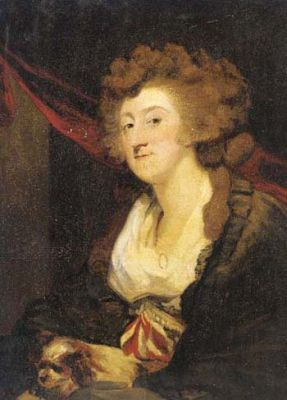
- Lady Amelia Hume, by Joshua Reynolds
- Born: Amelia Egerton; 25 November 1751
- Died: 8 August 1809 (aged 57); London, England
- Known for: Introducing plants from India and the Far East into England
- Spouse: Sir Abraham Hume, 2nd Baronet
- Scientific career
- Fields: Horticulture

Amelia Egerton, also known as Lady Amelia Hume (25 November 1751 – 8 August 1809), was a British horticulturalist. She and her husband, Sir Abraham Hume, 2nd Baronet, are best known for their rare plant collection at Wormleybury and their introduction of many rare plant species into England.

== Biography ==
=== Early life ===
Amelia Egerton, daughter of John Egerton, was born on the 25 November 1751. Her brothers were the John Egerton, 7th Earl of Bridgewater and Francis Egerton, 8th Earl of Bridgewater. She was granted the rank of earl's daughter in 1805 and was subsequently known as Lady Amelia Hume. She married Sir Abraham Hume in April, 1771. In 1772, Lord Hume inherited Wormleybury, an 18th-century private house with a landscape park, from his father, Sir Abraham Hume, 1st Baronet, after his death in 1772. The house is located near Wormley in Broxbourne, Hertfordshire.

=== Wormleybury ===
Lady and Lord Hume were well known among leading 18th-century botanists and horticulturalists, both in England and abroad. Between 1785 and 1825, they introduced many rare plant species into England. Most of their plants came from India and the Far East. With the help of their gardener, James Mean, the exotic plants were maintained out in the open and in specially designed and constructed glass houses. The glass houses were installed with elaborate stoves to maintain the temperature and humidity of many exotic plants and trees. Lord and Lady Holmes were very successful in establishing and propagating the plants that were entrusted to their care at Wormleybury.

Lady Hume died in London on 8 August 1809. She was survived by her husband, Lord Hume, and her two daughters, watercolor painter Amelia Long (1772–1837), and Sophia, Countess Brownlow (1787–1814).

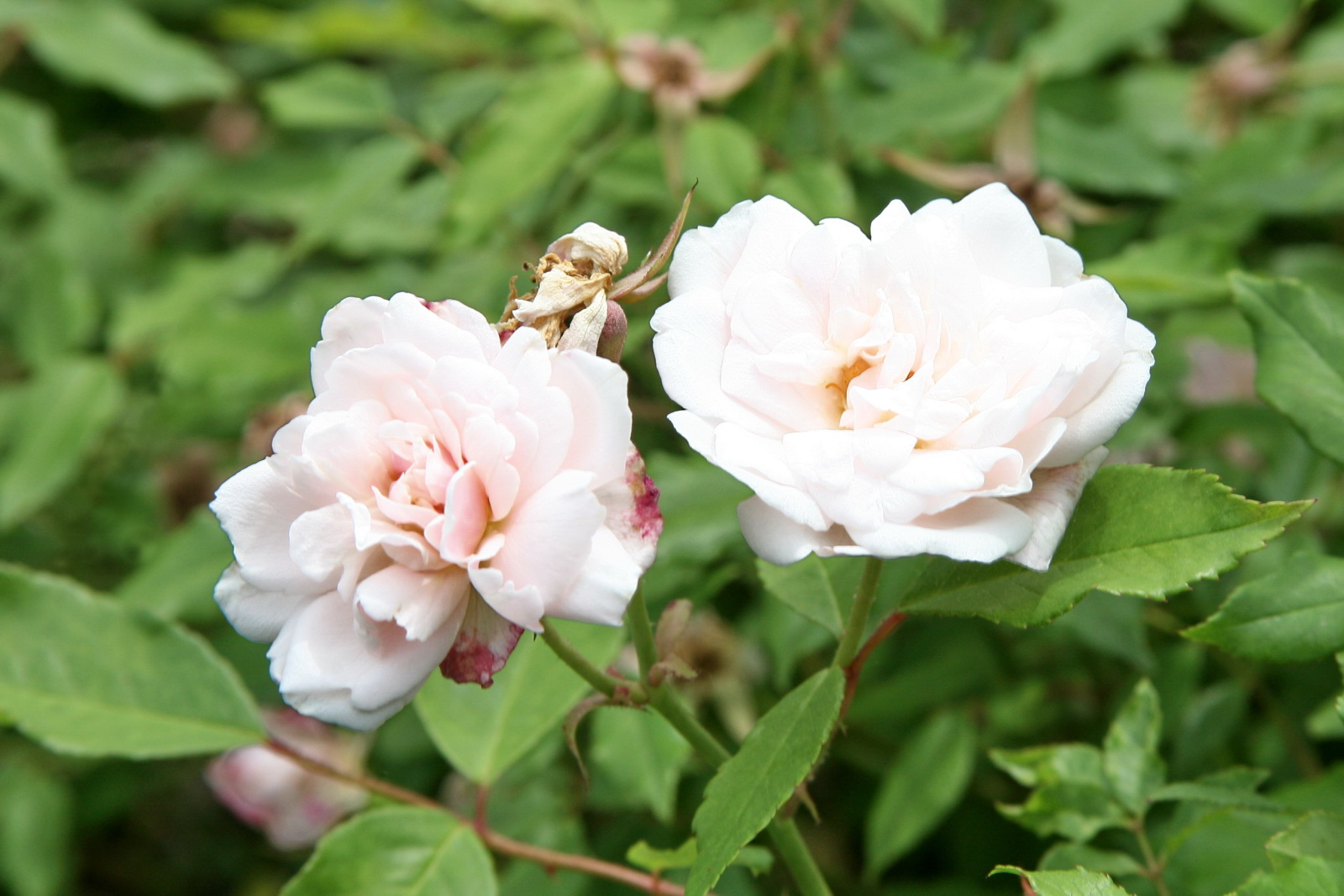
The rosa odorata "Hume's Blush Tea-Scented"

== Contributions ==
Botanist James Edward Smith, dedicated his book, Spicilegium Botanicum, Gleanings in Botany (1791) to Lady Hume. He discussed Lady Humes's contribution to English horticulture in his volume, Exotic Botany, "Dr. Roxburgh (Calcutta Botanic Garden, India) ... has sent Lady Hume a fine young tree of this species, Dellinia speciosa, Malabar, which is now in a very thriving state. It is presumed to be the first ever brought alive to Europe". Lord and Lady Hume introduced many new plant species into England, including the first white pomegranate (Punica granatum fl. Alba) in 1796, the 'Maiden's Blush' (Camellia japonica) and the large Mandarin orange (Citrus nobilis) in 1805. The Hume's most important introduction, the first Tea Rose from China, 'Hume's Blush Tea Scented China Rose' (Rosa odorata) was planted at Wormleybury in 1810.
