= Sir Abraham Hume, 2nd Baronet =

British floriculturist and Tory politician (1749–1838)

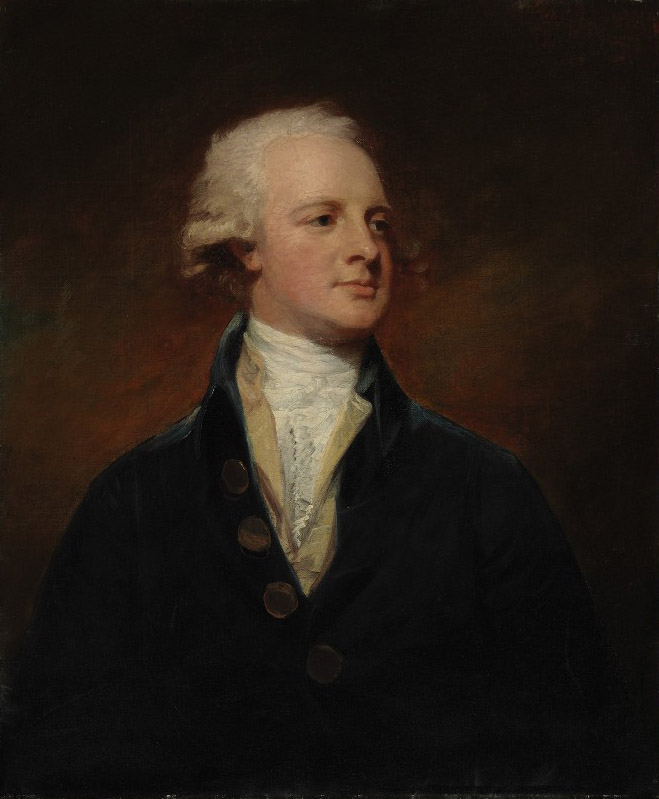
Abraham Hume by George Romney

Sir Abraham Hume, 2nd Baronet (29 February 1749 – 24 March 1838, in London) was a British floriculturist and Tory politician who sat in the House of Commons between 1774 and 1818.

== Life and Politics ==
He was born the eldest son of Sir Abraham Hume, 1st Baronet, of Wormleybury, Hertfordshire, whom he succeeded in 1772, inheriting his title and the Wormleybury estate.

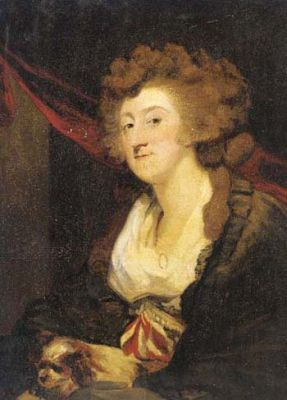
Lady Amelia Hume by Joshua Reynolds

He was appointed High Sheriff of Hertfordshire for 1774 and also elected at the 1774 general election as a Member of Parliament (MP) for the borough of Petersfield in Hampshire, and holding the seat until the 1780 general election, when he did not contest Petersfield again.

He was returned to the House of Commons 27 years later, at the 1807 general election as an MP for the borough of Hastings in Sussex. He resigned the seat in early 1812 in order to contest a by-election in Boston, where he was defeated in April 1812, and was then re-elected for Hastings at a by-election later the same month. At the 1812 general election, he contested both Boston and Hastings, but was elected only in the latter, and held that seat until the 1818 general election, when he contested neither Boston nor Hastings.

He died in 1838. He had married Amelia Egerton (25 November 1751 – 8 August 1809), daughter of John Egerton, Bishop of Durham. They had two daughters, both of whom predeceased him:

- Amelia Hume (21 January 1772 – 15 January 1837), who married Charles Long, 1st Baron Farnborough
- Amelia Sophia Hume (31 July 1788 – 21 February 1814), who married John Cust, 1st Earl Brownlow.

The Baronetcy thereby became extinct and the Wormleybury estate passed to the male children of Lady Brownlow (Viscount Alford and the Hon. Charles Henry Cust) who jointly sold it in 1853 to a Henry John Grant.

== Yeomanry career ==
After Britain was drawn into the French Revolutionary Wars, Prime Minister William Pitt the Younger proposed in 1794 that the counties should form a part-time force of Volunteer Yeoman Cavalry (Yeomanry) for home defence and internal security. Hertfordshire began raising its Yeomanry in June, and Hume was commissioned as Lieutenant in the Southern Troop commanded by his neighbour, Captain Sir George Prescott, 1st Baronet, of Theobalds Park, Cheshunt. In the spring of 1798 the increased threat of invasion led the government to encourage the formation of armed associations of cavalry and infantry for purely local defence. Hume formed a Troop of horse or 'flying' artillery to support the Yeomanry cavalry, with himself as captain. The volunteers were disbanded after the Treaty of Amiens, but the peace was shortlived, and on the resumption of war the Hertfordshire units were reformed in August 1803. Hume took over command of the Southern Troop as well as his horse artillery, with the rank of Major. He assumed command of an unofficial 'all arms' force, the South Hertfordshire Legion consisting of the Southern Troop of Yeomanry Cavalry, the Horse Artillery Troop, and the Cheshunt and Wormley Volunteer Infantry. After the Battle of Waterloo the remaining volunteers were disbanded and the Yeomanry declined. Hume's Southern Troop and Artillery Troop were the last remaining parts of the Hertfordshire Yeomanry when they were disbanded in 1824. Although too old to serve himself, Hume took a close interest when the Hertfordshire Yeomanry was re-raised in 1830, providing advice and funding, and the regimental historian notes that he occupied a position in the regiment akin to a present-day Honorary Colonel.

== Rosarian and Art Collector ==
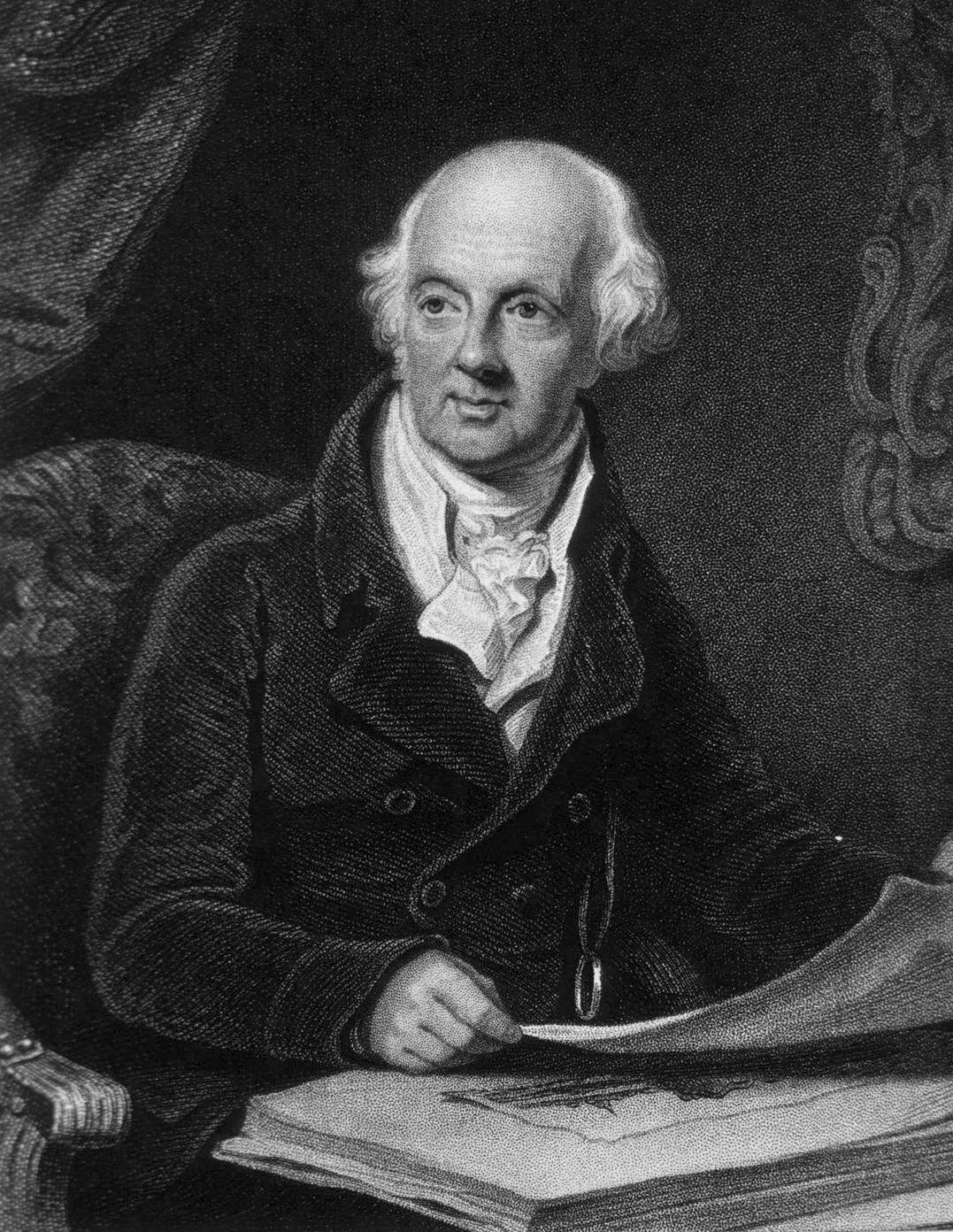
Abraham Hume by Henry Edridge

Both Sir Abraham Hume and his wife Amelia Egerton were active as rosarians and developed several rose cultivars at their estate in Hertfordshire. He was elected a Fellow of the Royal Society in December 1775, and one of the founding members of the Geological Society and the British Institution.

He was a keen art collector, especially of Old Master prints and drawings (drawings by Polidoro da Caravaggio were a particular favourite). He was friends with Sir Joshua Reynolds who painted portraits of him and his wife and left him in his will the choice of his Claude Lorrain including a small painting now in the Metropolitan Museum of Art, New York. The earliest of Hume's portraits by Reynolds is now in the National Gallery. In 1783 John Jones and in 1791 C. H. Hodges issued engravings of the portraits of Hume. There is also a Portrait of Lady Hume by Cosway. And 1783 Valentine Green engraved the portrait of Lady Hume by Reynolds. In 1786 Sir Abraham Hume bought the Portrait of a Condottiero, Giovanni Emo by Giovanni Bellini which was kept by his heirs and family until 1923 and is now in the National Gallery of Art. In 1815 a 'Catalogue Raisonné' of the diamonds of Sir Abraham Hume was published and in 1824 a 'Descriptive Catalogue' of his collection, which was for sale. Most of the artworks including works by Titian had been acquired at Venice and Bologna between 1786 and 1800.

== Bibliography ==
- Sir Abraham Hume
- Drummond, Henry (1844). History of Noble British Families. London: William Pickering.

Parliament of Great Britain
Preceded by Welbore Ellis; William Jolliffe	Member of Parliament for Petersfield; 1774–1780; With: William Jolliffe	Succeeded by Thomas Jolliffe; William Jolliffe
Parliament of the United Kingdom
Preceded by Sir William Middleton, Bt; Sir John Nicholl	Member of Parliament for Hastings; 1807–1818; With: George Canning 1807–12; James Dawkins 1812–18	Succeeded by George Peter Holford; James Dawkins
Baronetage of Great Britain
Preceded by Abraham Hume	Baronet (of Wormleybury, Herts); 1772–1838	Extinct
