= Charles Greville (1762–1832) =

British politician and public official (1762-1832)

Member of Parliament for Petersfield
- In office 1795–1796 Serving with William Jolliffe
- Preceded by: Marquess of Titchfield
- Succeeded by: Hylton Jolliffe

Personal details
- Born: 2 November 1762
- Died: 26 August 1832 (aged 69) Hanover Square, London
- Spouse: Lady Charlotte Cavendish-Bentinck (m. 1793)
- Children: Charles Greville (son); Algernon Greville (son); Henry Greville (son)
- Parents: Fulke Greville (father); Frances Macartney (mother)
- Relatives: Algernon Greville (paternal grandfather); James Macartney (maternal grandfather); Francis Egerton (son-in-law); Frances Greville (sister)
- Education: Westminster School
- Military career
- Allegiance: Great Britain
- Service years: 1778-1796

Charles Greville (2 November 1762 – 26 August 1832) was a British politician and public official.

Greville was the fifth child and fourth son of Fulke Greville and his wife, Frances (née Macartney). His parents lived at Wilbury House, Newton Tony, Wiltshire. He was educated at Westminster School. From 1778 to 1796, he was an officer in various Regiments of Foot.

On 31 March 1793, he married Lady Charlotte Cavendish-Bentinck, the third child and first daughter of William Cavendish-Bentinck, 3rd Duke of Portland. They had four children:

- Harriet Catherine Greville, who married Francis Egerton, 1st Earl of Ellesmere
- Charles Cavendish Fulke Greville
- Algernon Frederick Greville, Private Secretary to the Duke of Wellington
- Henry William Greville

He served as the Member of Parliament for Petersfield from 1795 to 1796. He was Under-Secretary of State for Home Affairs from March 1796 to March 1798; Comptroller of Cash at the Excise Office from 1799; Receiver-General Taxes, for Nottinghamshire; Naval Officer for Demerara and Essequibo from 1798; and Secretary, Registrar and Clerk of Council for Tobago from 1801.

He died on 26 August 1832, aged 69, in Hanover Square, London.

Parliament of Great Britain
Preceded by Marquess of Titchfield	Member of Parliament for Petersfield; 1795–1796; With: William Jolliffe	Succeeded by Hylton Jolliffe
