= Thomas Samuel Jolliffe =

British politician

Thomas Samuel Jolliffe (born Petersfield House, Petersfield 22 June 1746 - died Ammerdown House, Kilmersdon 6 June 1824) was a British politician.

Joliffe was the second son of John Joliffe, Member of Parliament for Petersfield from 1741 to 1754, and then again from 1761 to 1768. He was educated at Winchester College.

He was High Sheriff of Somerset from 1792 to 1793.

Parliament of Great Britain
Preceded by Abraham Hume	Member of Parliament for Petersfield; 1780–1787; With: William Jolliffe	Succeeded by John Christopher Burton Dawnay
