= Top Field and Cozens Grove =

Nature reserve in Hertfordshire, England

Coordinates: 51.7416°N 0.03164°W

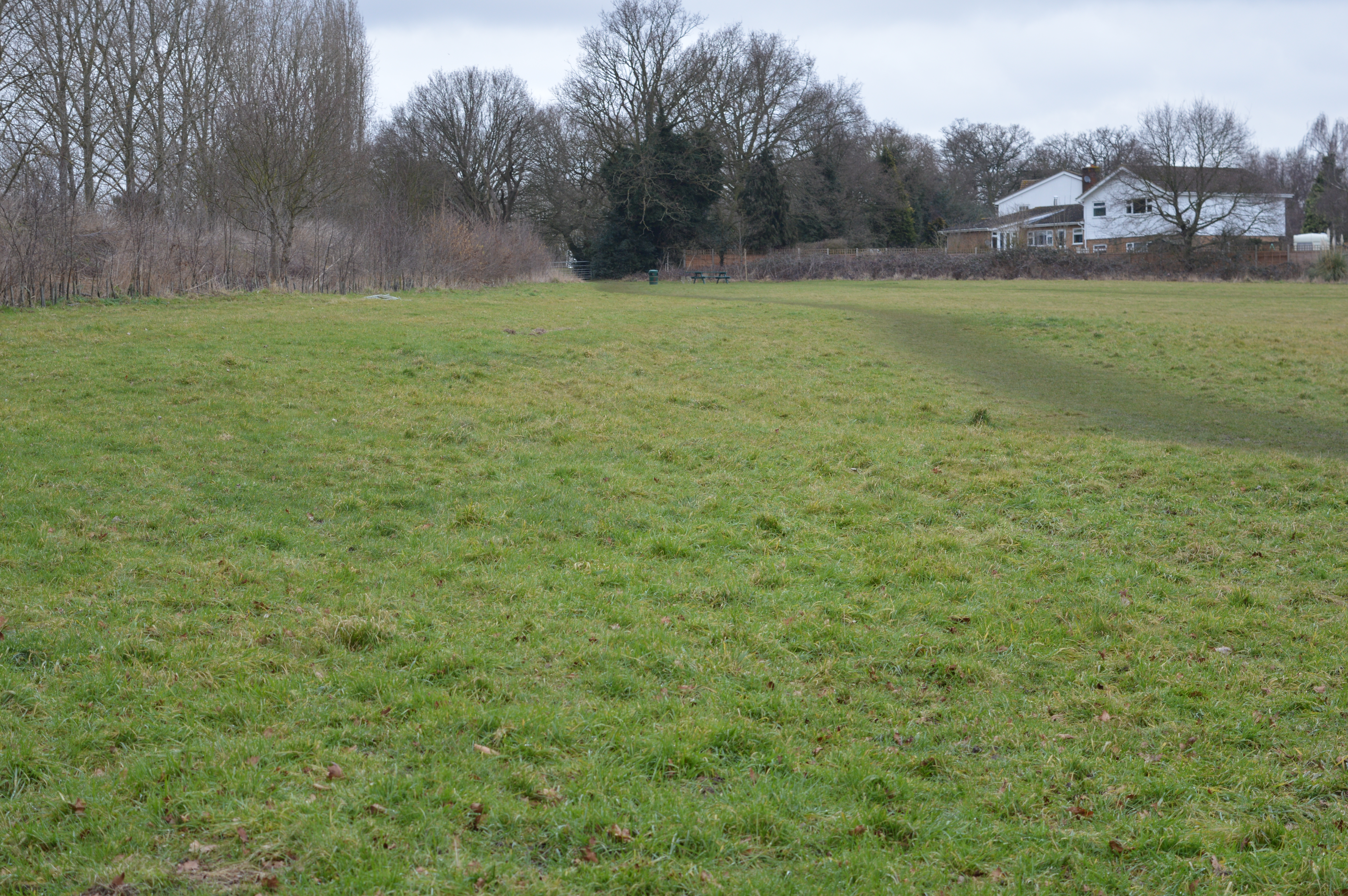
Top Field

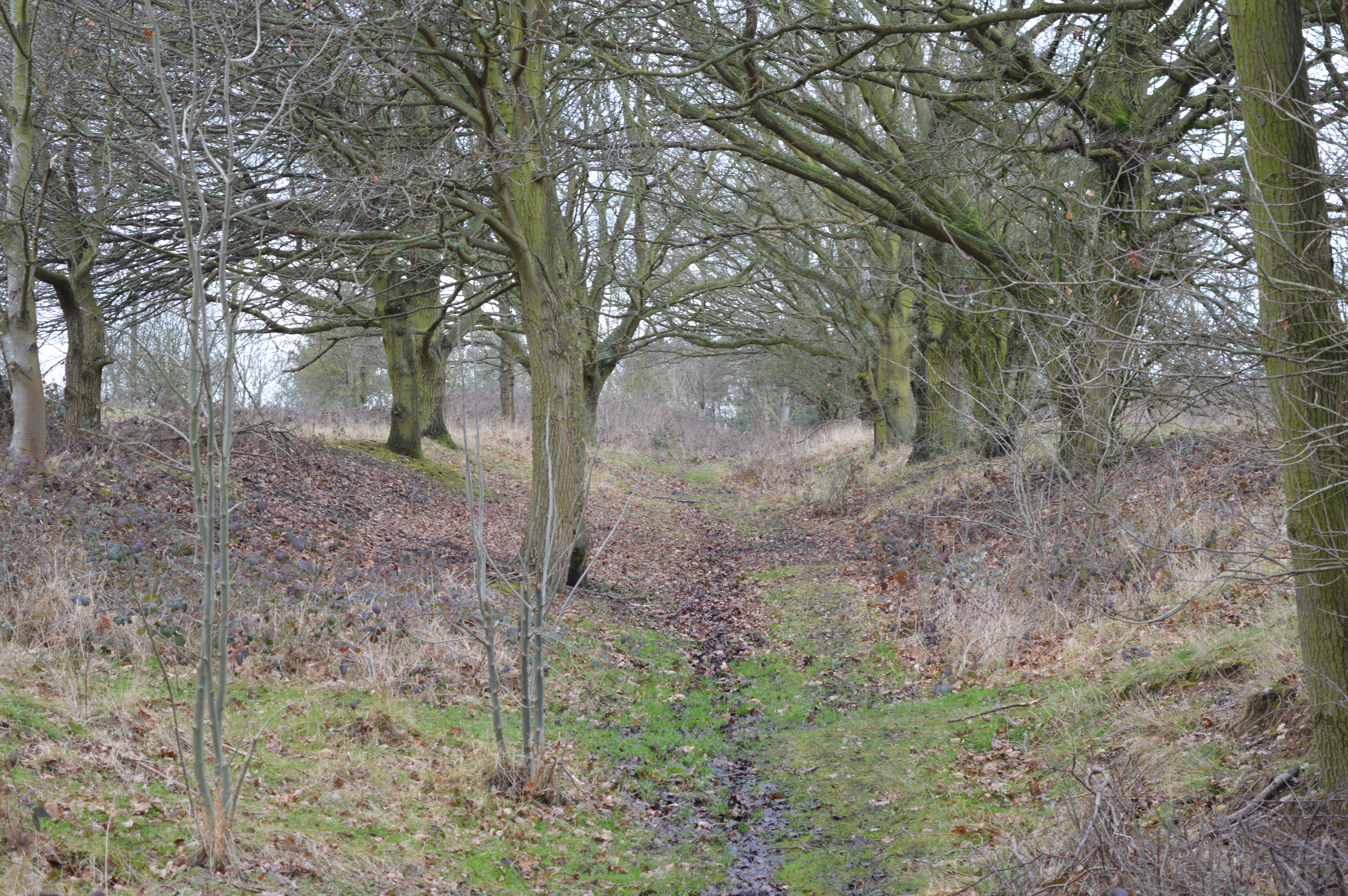
Cozens Grove

Top Field and Cozens Grove is a 6.1 hectare Local Nature Reserve in Wormley in Hertfordshire. It is owned and managed by Broxbourne Borough Council.

Top Field (also known as Wormley Top Field) is a wildflower meadow which is mown to provide a habitat for small mammals, birds and insects. In 2014 it was given the Green Flag Award. Cozens Grove is an ancient wood which has coppiced hornbeam and a medieval sunken ditch.

In 2010 Broxbourne Council proposed to remove the site from the Green Belt, which would have laid it open to development, but the proposal was dropped after campaigning by the Friends of Wormley Open Spaces.

There is access from Cozens Lane West.
