= Wormleybury =

House in Wormley, Hertfordshire, England

Coordinates: 51.73456°N 0.04064°W

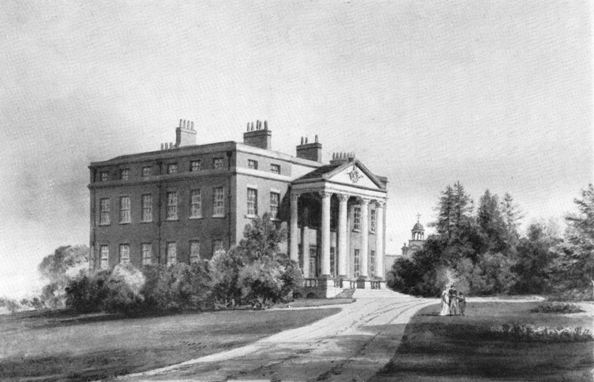
Wormleybury Manor

Wormleybury is an 18th-century house surrounded by a landscaped park of 57 ha (140 acres) near Wormley in Broxbourne, Hertfordshire, England, a few miles north of Greater London. The house was rebuilt in the 1770s from an earlier house built in 1734. The house is a Grade I listed building. The garden is well known for its historic rare plant collection. There is a crescent shaped lake in the grounds, bordered by woods on three sides.

== History ==
The estate of Wormleybury, originally known as Wormley Bury, was one of several estates which King Harold endowed and granted to the Canons of Waltham Abbey (Waltham Holy Cross). In 1220 the Canons of Waltham constructed a conduit for carrying water from Wormley to the monastery.

A house was built on the site in 1525, just north of the present building. The first house's owner was Edward Sharnebrook. Wormley Bury was in the Abbey's possession until the Dissolution of the Monasteries, between 1536 and 1541. Afterwards, the estate was granted to Edward North and his heirs. North, Treasurer of the Court of Augmentations, at once alienated it to William Woodliffe or Woodcliffe, mercer of London. He died in 1548, and one half came to one of his two daughters, Ann, who married John Purvey. North sold the other half of the manor to Elizabeth Woodcliffe. The house was subsequently bequeathed to William Woodcliffe. John Purvey was succeeded by a son, William Purvey, who appears to have been in possession of the reunited manor in 1597. It then passed to the Tookes, descendants of the other sister, until it was sold to Richard Woollaston, who died in 1691. Richard Woollaston conveyed the manor to William Fellowes, whose eldest son, Coulston Fellowes, was the possessor in 1728.

From the latter, the manor passed in 1733 by sale to John Deane.. The sixteenth century house was replaced by a new house built in 1734 by John Deane who sold it in 1739 to Alexander Hume (1693–1765).

Sir Abraham Hume, 1st Baronet (1703–1772), inherited the estate from his brother Alexander when he died in 1765. Architect, Robert Mylne supervised the house remodel from 1767 to 1769, and from 1781 to 1782, after Abraham's son, Sir Abraham Hume, 2nd Baronet (1749–1838) inherited the estate after his father's death in 1772. The interior decoration of the house was supervised by Robert Adam from 1777 to 1779. Adam also designed the garden buildings for the estate. The drawing room has painted roundels by Angelica Kauffman.

In 1838, after the 2nd baronet died without male issue, the Wormleybury estate passed to the male children of his daughter Sophia, Lady Brownlow, the wife of Brownlow Cust, 1st Baron Brownlow (1744–1807) (Viscount Alford and the Hon. Charles Henry Cust). They sold it in 1853 to Henry John Grant, on whose death it passed to his widow, Mary Grant. In 1880, Under the will of H. J. Grant, the manor passed to his cousin, Henry Jeffreys Bushby, and then to his son, Mr. Henry North Grant Bushby. The late Sir Whittaker Ellis took a lease of the property, and did a good deal to modernise the house. On his death, this long lease was purchased by Mr. Albert Pam.

The estate then passed through several owners, and is currently divided into flats. The house is a Grade I listed building.

== Park and garden ==
The 2nd baronet and his wife Lady Amelia (1751–1809) were well known among leading horticulturalists during the late eighteenth and early nineteenth centuries, both in England and abroad. With the help of their gardener, James Mean, they established many exotic plant species in the gardens and greenhouses at Wormleybury. They introduced into England, between 1785 and 1825, a large collection of rare plants, primarily from India and the Far East. In 1793 British botanist James Sowerby made some of his observations of exotic mushrooms in the hothouses and greenhouses of Wormleybury as detailed in his 1796 illustrated book Coloured figures of English fungi or mushrooms. The tropical species Leucocoprinus birnbaumii, commonly known as the plantpot dapperling, was observed growing here and was likely introduced along with these exotic plant species.

Botanist James Edward Smith, along with other notable botanists at the time, discussed the Humes's contribution to English horticulture in their publications. Many new plant species were first cultivated at Wormleybury after they arrived in England. According to Smith, in his volume, Exotic Botany, "Dr. Roxburgh ... has sent Lady Hume a fine young tree of this species, Dellinia speciosa, Malabar, which is now in a very thriving state. It is presumed to be the first ever brought alive to Europe". The Humes introduced the first white pomegranate (Punica granatum fl. Alba) in England in 1796, and the 'Maiden's Blush' (Camellia japonica) and the large Mandarin orange (Citrus nobilis) in 1805.

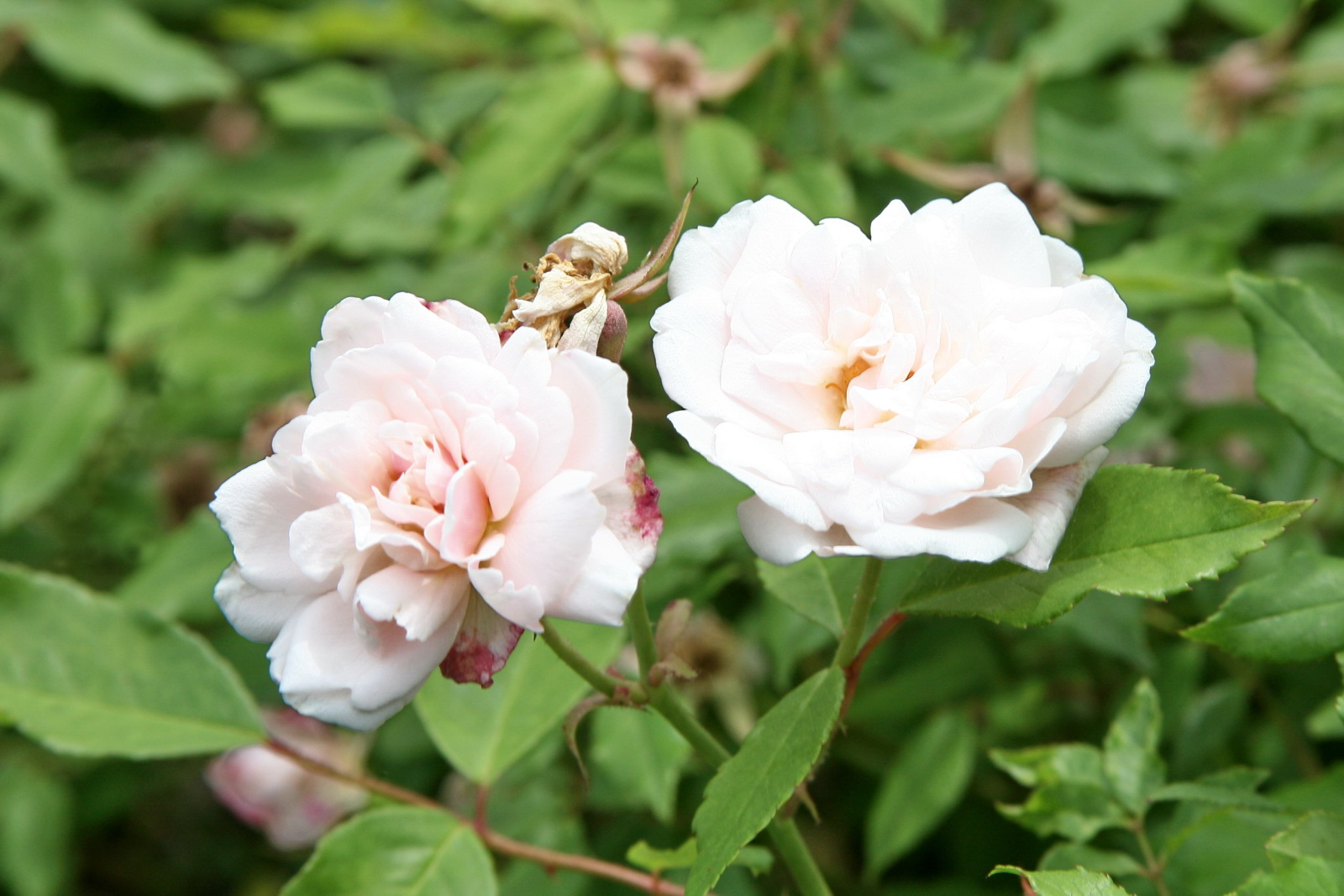
The rosa odorata "Hume's Blush Tea-Scented"

The Hume's most important introduction, the first Tea Rose from China, 'Hume's Blush Tea Scented China Rose' (Rosa odorata) was planted at Wormleybury in 1810.

Wormleybury is listed Grade II in the Register of Historic Parks and Gardens.
