= Portrait of a Condottiero =

Painting by Giovanni Bellini

Portrait of Giovanni Emo
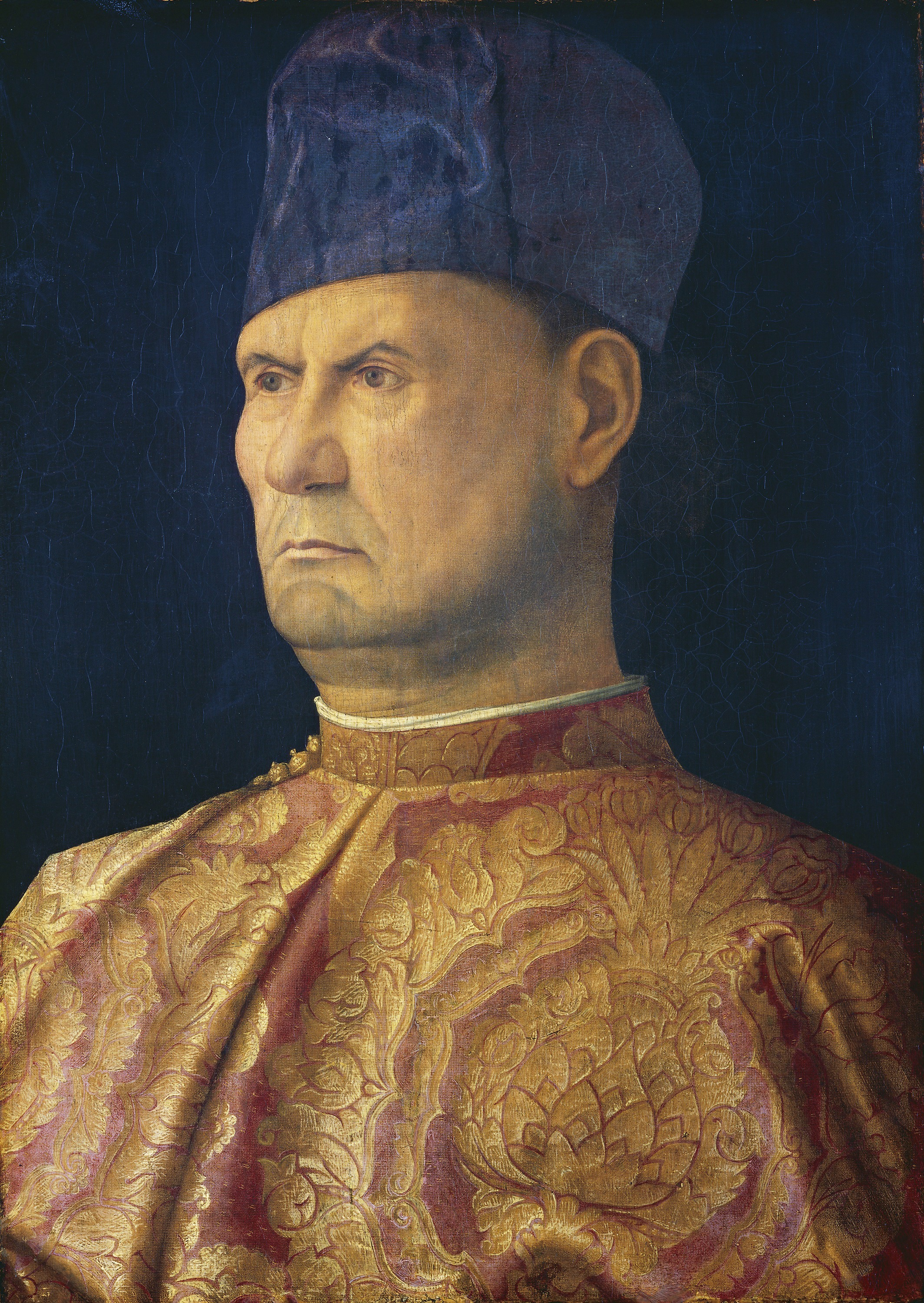
- Artist: Giovanni Bellini
- Year: ca. 1495–1500
- Medium: Oil on panel
- Dimensions: 51 cm × 37 cm (20 in × 15 in)
- Location: National Gallery of Art, Washington, DC

The Portrait of Giovanni Emo is an oil-on-panel painting by Italian Renaissance artist Giovanni Bellini, executed around 1495–1500. It is housed in the National Gallery of Art at Washington, DC, United States.

== History ==
The portrait is one of Bellini's more evolved in this field, an activity he had started around 1474. The provenance of the work is unknown, as it is known only from 1786 when the Venetian doctor Pellegrini sold to Sir Abraham Hume. The latter's heirs sold it on the London market 1923 and again in 1936, when it was bought by the Samuel H. Kress Foundation. It was donated to the current American museum in 1939.

== Description ==
The painting portrays an unknown, aged Italian condottiero's bust, seen from three-quarters above a dark background. The basic influence is still that of Antonello da Messina. The subject was once identified as Jacopo Marcello, captain-general of the Republic of Venice, which led to an early dating around 1482-1485; Bellini had executed a portrait for Marcello in his family house. Other identifications include Bartolomeo d'Alviano (basing on a statement by later Renaissance art historian Giorgio Vasari) and Giovanni Emo, implying that it could have been executed around 1475–1500.

The condottiere wears a brocade blouse and a blue beret. His features are deep, and has a fierce expression.

== See also ==
- List of works by Giovanni Bellini

== Sources ==
- Olivari, Mariolina (2007). "Giovanni Bellini". Pittori del Rinascimento. Florence: Scala. ISBN 888117099X.
