= George Greville (diplomat) =

British diplomat

Sir George Greville, KCMG (12 May 1851 – 25 October 1937) was a British diplomat.

He was the elder son of Captain Algernon William Bellingham Greville, of Granard, and the great-grandson of Fulke Greville. His uncle was Fulke Greville-Nugent, 1st Baron Greville. He was educated at Magdalen College, Oxford and entered HM Diplomatic Service in 1875.

Greville was Secretary of the British Legation at Rio de Janeiro in 1892, Consul-General at Budapest in 1896, Minister Resident at Bangkok from 1896 to 1900, and Envoy Extraordinary and Minister Plenipotentiary to Mexico from 1900 to 1905. Greville was appointed CMG in 1895 and promoted KCMG in 1905.

A Roman Catholic convert, Greville died in Brussels in 1937.

== Family ==
Greville married in 1897, Louisa, daughter of L. Nicholays, of Frankfurt. Their daughter Georgette Greville (1896–1968) became a Catholic nun in Saigon.
