= Henry Francis Greville =

Lt-Col. Henry Francis Greville (10 August 1760 – 13 January 1816) was a British impresario.

== Early life and military career ==
He was the son of Member of Parliament Fulke Greville and poet Frances Greville.

In 1777 he was appointed an ensign in the Coldstream Guards, and in 1781 was promoted to lieutenant. Deployed to North America during the American Revolutionary War, he became a prisoner of war (POW) following the British surrender at Yorktown. In May 1782, he was one of 13 POWs forced to draw lots to determine which one should be executed in retaliation for the execution of a patriot captain by Loyalists, in what became known as the Asgill Affair.

In 1790, he was appointed to the 4th Regiment of Dragoon Guards to serve in Ireland as lieutenant-colonel.

== Theatrical career ==
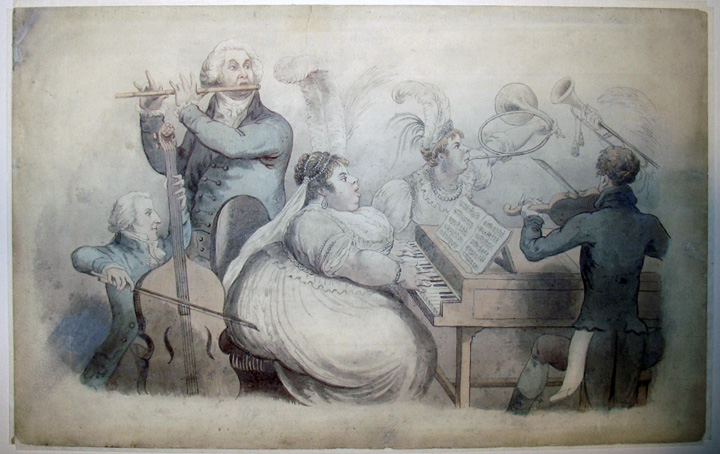
The Pic-Nic Orchestra, watercolor, c. 1802, by Edward Francis Burney after the etching by James Gillray. Henry Francis Greville appears playing the violin. Lord Edgcumbe is on the cello, and Lord Cholmondeley is on the flute.

While in the army he became interested in theatricals, and after leaving the army tried to organize professional theatre shows. His first "theatrical fête" was in 1801, and included supper for his friends, intended to mean a picnic, which he intended as a potluck. Based on the success of this venture, he decided to form a Pic-Nic Society the next year, which lasted only one year, although an unsuccessful attempt was made to revive it the following year. In January 1803, he began a weekly newspaper, the Pic-Nic, to report theatrical affairs, which he handed over to William Combe in February.

In 1803, he purchased the lease on a mansion on Little Argyll Street from Hylton Jolliffe for £70. After making alterations and adding to it, in 1806 he gave two balls, the first of which was on 2 June and was attended by the Prince of Wales, the Duke of Cambridge and the Duchess of York. He then borrowed £2,000 from the banker Thomas Coutts and purchased the freehold on the house in July. At first he styled the house "The Fashionable Institution," but later changed the name to the Argyll Rooms.

In 1807, the Lord Chamberlain granted Greville an annual license to host music, dancing, burlettas, and dramatic performances at the Argyll Rooms. The license was renewed the next year, but afterwards, the license was confined to music and dancing. William Taylor, the manager of the King's Theatre in Haymarket, described the first two seasons as: "There was no Stage, beyond a small elevation for the Singers to stand upon, and … no more than four of these were employed in petit pices [sic] of one short Act merely introductory to assemblies and Balls, and … no Dancers were ever seen, confined alone to subscribers for only 12 nights the first year and but 8 the second and last experiment there, and … no money was even taken at the doors."

By 1811, Greville was ill and in deep debt. He tried to sell the Argyll Rooms in 1811. He went abroad in 1812, possibly as a condition of his family helping with his debts, and died on 13 January 1816 in Port Louis, Mauritius.

== Personal life ==
He married Catherine Graham, daughter of Sir Bellingham Graham, in 1793. Following her death in 1803, he married Sophia Lambert, the daughter of James Francis Xavier Whyte, in 1805. Among his children was the admiral Henry Francis Greville.
