= Frances Greville =

Irish poet and celebrity

Frances Greville (née Macartney; c. 1724 – 1789) was an Anglo-Irish poet and celebrity in Georgian England.

== Life ==
She was born in Longford, Ireland in the mid-1720s; one of four daughters of James Macartney and Catherine (née Coote), daughter of the eminent judge Thomas Coote and niece of Richard Coote, 1st Earl of Bellomont.

By the early 1740s, she was in London, accompanying Sarah Lennox, Duchess of Richmond. Horace Walpole's poem The Beauties (1746) mentions her as "Fanny" among the most prominent women at court.

Frances married Fulke Greville of Wilbury House (Wiltshire) in 1748 after an elopement. Greville was a gambler and a dandy, but that he loved his wife is witnessed by her presence, as "Flora," in his Maxims, Characters, and Reflections (1756).

She spent the 1760s and 1770s in travel. Her husband was named envoy to Bavaria in 1764. She was a known conversationalist, befriending Charles and Frances Burney, as well as Richard Brinsley Sheridan, who dedicated his The Critic to her.

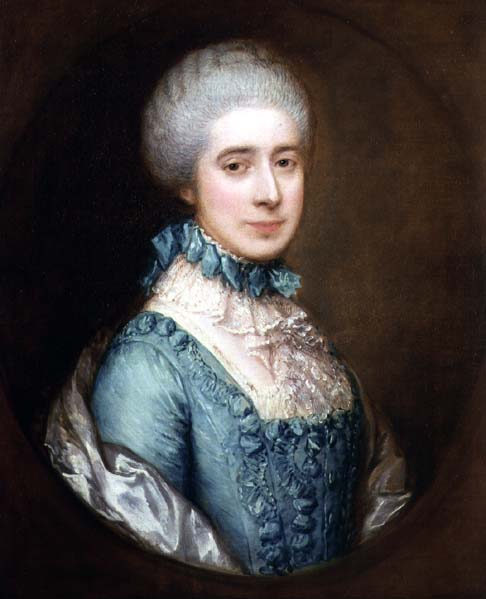
Mrs Crewe, daughter of Fulke and Frances Greville

Her daughter, Frances Anne Crewe, (1748–1818), became a prominent Whig hostess. Her three sons William (1751–1837), Henry (1760–1816) and Charles (1762–1832) had military careers. Henry later became a theatrical manager, with limited success.

Frances died 28 July 1789 at Hampton, London and is buried at St Peter's Church, Petersham.

== Writing ==
Frances Greville's career as an amateur poet was marked by one resounding success: her poem, "Prayer for Indifference", first published in the Edinburgh Chronicle, in 1759, offers an attack on the cult of sensibility. It was reprinted regularly in the following decades, often paired with a poem in praise of sensibility. Her output otherwise was light, and mostly within the confines of vers de société.

Frances d'Arblay wrote that "though the fame of her beauty must pass … the fame of her intellect must ever live, while sensibility may be linked with poetry, and the Ode to Indifference shall remain to shew their union."

It has been surmised, by Seumas O'Sullivan among others, that Frances contributed to the anonymous Maxims, Characters and Reflections (1756) generally attributed to her husband.
