= Wormley, Hertfordshire =

Village in Hertfordshire, England

Coordinates: 51.72°N 0.02°W

Wormley
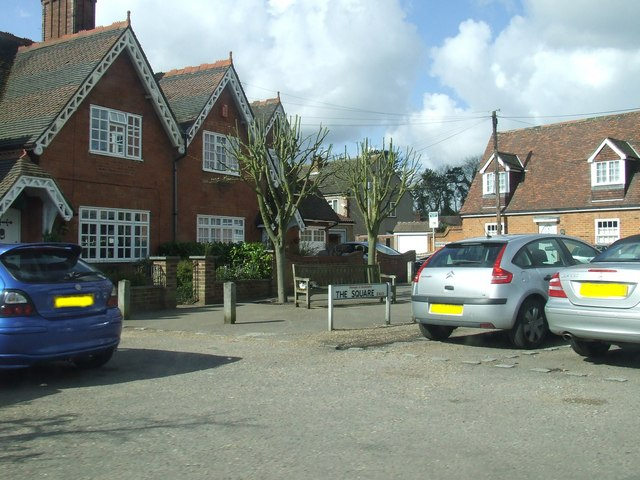
- The Square, Wormley

- Location within Hertfordshire
- Population: less than 5,000
- OS grid reference: TL322054
- District: Broxbourne
- Shire county: Hertfordshire
- Region: East
- Country: England
- Sovereign state: United Kingdom
- Post town: Broxbourne
- Postcode district: EN10
- Dialling code: 01992
- Police: Hertfordshire
- Fire: Hertfordshire
- Ambulance: East of England
- UK Parliament: Broxbourne

Wormley is a village lying between Hoddesdon and Cheshunt in the Broxbourne borough of Hertfordshire, England. It was formerly a civil parish, which was abolished in 1935 and absorbed into Hoddesdon.

== Geography ==
Wormley is located east of the A10 road, which links Cambridge to London, commonly known as the Great Cambridge Road.

Wormley is sandwiched between Broxbourne and Turnford with a high road of shops. It is 1 mile south of Broxbourne, and the nearest railway station is Broxbourne.

Wormley is close to the River Lea which runs from Luton towards Wheathampstead, then south towards London where it meets the River Thames. Wormley Rovers Football Club and Wormley Cricket Club are based at Wormley playing fields. Wormley also has Top Field and Cozens Grove Local Nature Reserve.

== History ==
The name is thought to derive from the Old English "snake-infested leah"; the last element could mean "clearing", or perhaps "woodland pasture". Wormley was one of the manors which were granted by Harold Godwinson to the canons of Waltham Holy Cross. It was entered in the Domesday Book of 1086 as Wermelai, with a total of 28 households. Wormley remained under the control of the monastery until its dissolution in 1540 when it was granted to Sir Edward North. The manor house, called Wormleybury, on the south side of Church Lane, was totally rebuilt in 1734 and remodelled in 1767 and 1782 by Robert Mylne for Sir Abraham Hume. It has a stone portico and steps, with an octagonal bell turret. There is interior decoration of 1779 by Robert Adam. It is a Grade I Listed building.

The parish church of St Lawrence has a nave and font dating from the 12th century. There are several brasses from the 15th century and a marble monument to the Purvy family dated 1617.

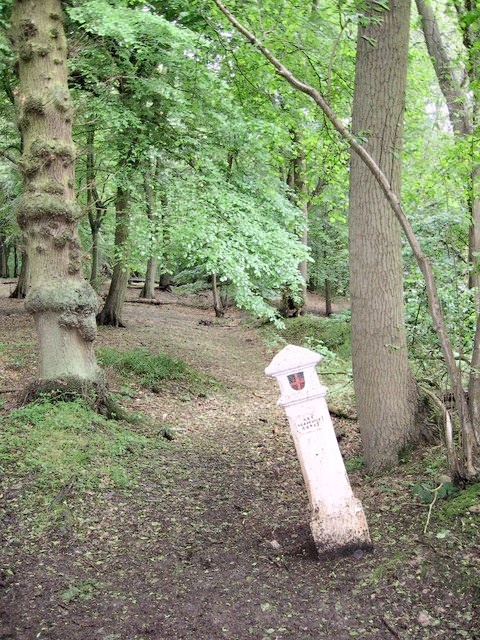
Coal-tax post on a footpath in Wormley Wood.

There are two coal-tax posts in Wormley, both in unusual locations. One is in the middle of Wormley Wood and the other on the north side of a country lane at a point where it is hard to imagine any significant trade traffic passing by. They were erected following the London Coal and Wine Duties Continuance Act 1861, and thanks to them, many of the bridges across the River Thames were paid for.

The civil parish was abolished in 1935. The main part around the village itself was added to Hoddesdon, and smaller areas went to Cheshunt and Brickendon Liberty. At the 1931 census (the last before the abolition of the parish) it had a population of 930.

== Community facilities ==
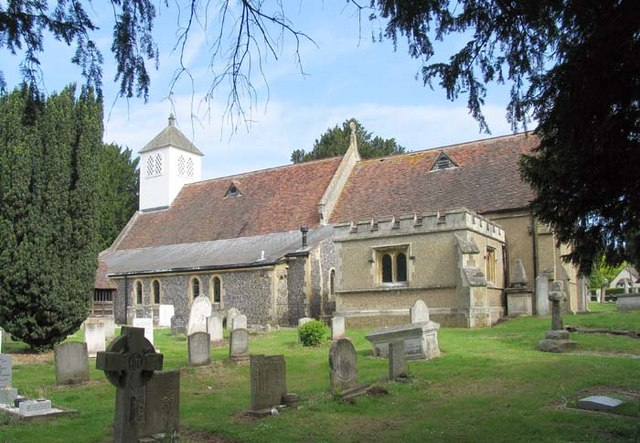
St Lawrence's Church dates back to the 12th century

St Lawrence's Church forms part of the Parish of Broxbourne with Wormley and is a member of the New River Group Ministry.

Bushby Hall (formerly Wormley Over Sixties Club) on Wharf Road is a community centre which can be hired for functions and is also the venue for ((Bounce)) Wormley.

Wormley Church of England Primary School was founded in 1864. It had 464 pupils in 2017/18.

1st Wormley Scout and Guide Group have been present in the community since 1908 and have Squirrels, Beavers, Cubs, Scouts, Rainbows, Brownies, Guides and Rangers all managed by a team of volunteers.

In 2014, the area of Wormley and Turnford was awarded £1m from the Big Local Trust to invest in the community over the next 10 years.

== Personalities ==
- David Bentley started his footballing career at Wormley Youth Football Club.
