= Charles Greville (diarist) =

English diarist and cricketer (1794–1865)

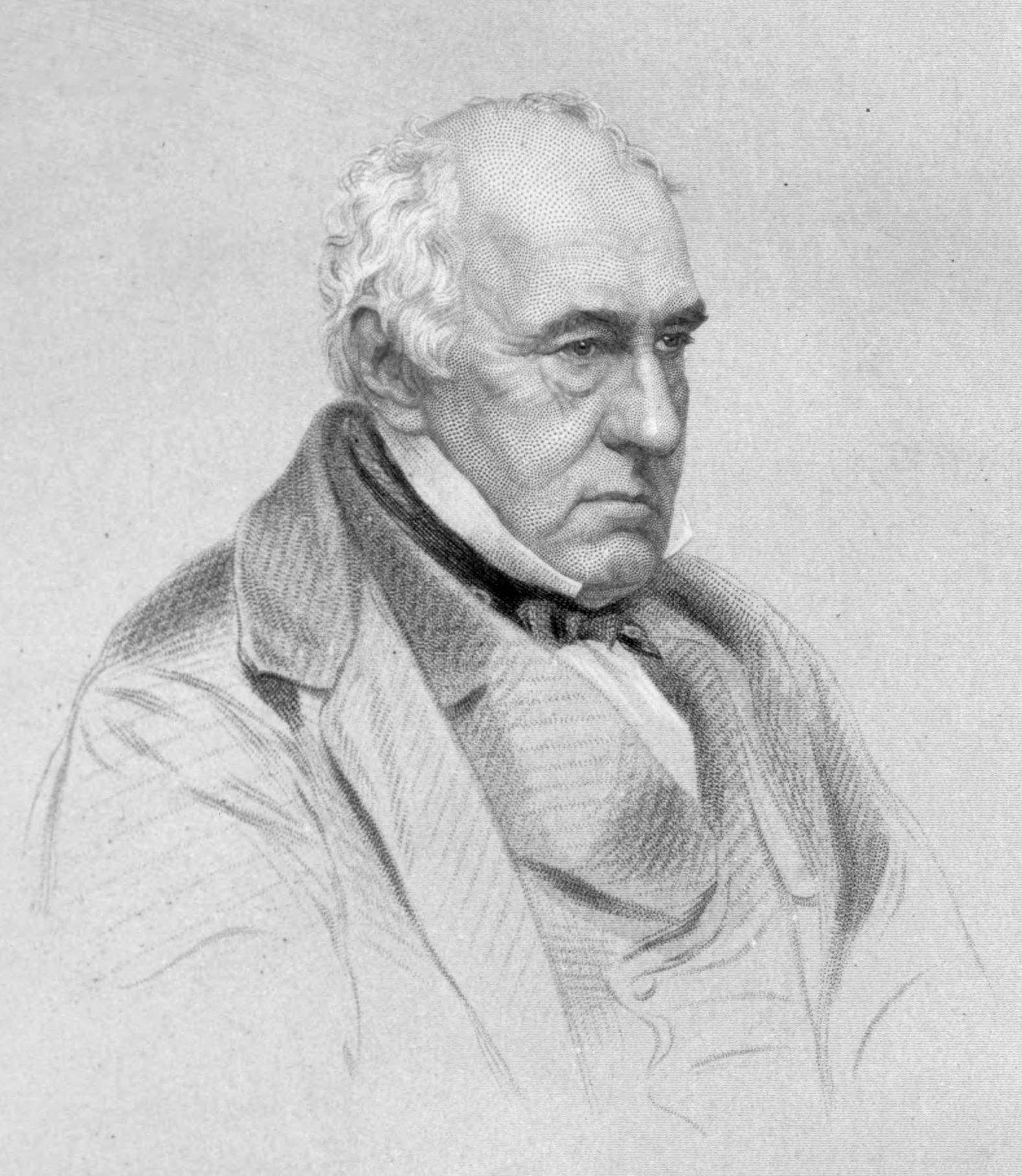
- Born: Charles Cavendish Fulke Greville; 2 April 1794
- Died: 17 January 1865 (aged 70)
- Education: Eton College; Christ Church, Oxford
- Occupation: Clerk of the Council in ordinary
- Known for: Writing journals of the reigns of George IV and William IV and Victoria (extending from 1820 to 1860)
- Father: Charles Greville

Signature
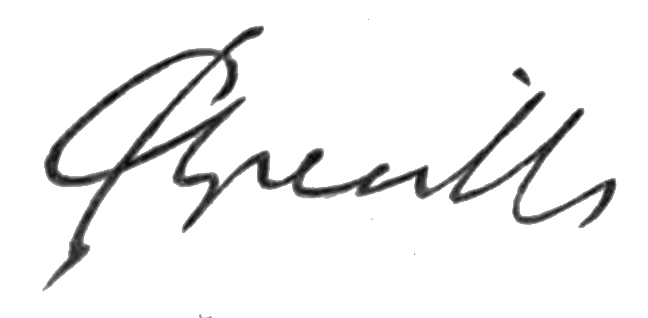

Charles Cavendish Fulke Greville (2 April 1794 – 17 January 1865) was an English diarist and an amateur cricketer who played from 1819 to 1827. His father, Charles Greville, was a second cousin of the 1st Earl of Warwick. His mother, Lady Charlotte Bentinck, was a daughter of the 3rd Duke of Portland (former leader of the Whig party and prime minister).

== Early life ==
Much of Greville's childhood was spent at his maternal grandfather's house at Bulstrode. He was one of the Pages of Honour to George III, and was educated at Eton and Christ Church, Oxford; but he left the university early, having been appointed private secretary to Earl Bathurst before he was twenty. The interest of the Duke of Portland had secured for him the secretaryship of the island of Jamaica, which was a sinecure office, the duties being performed by a deputy, and the reversion of the clerkship of the council. His mother was widely believed to be the mistress of the Duke of Wellington, an affair which caused her family much distress, and may account for Greville's frequently hostile attitude to Wellington.

== Cricket career ==
Mainly associated with Marylebone Cricket Club (MCC), he made five known appearances in important matches. He played for the Gentlemen in the Gentlemen v Players series. His brother was Algernon Greville.

== Public career ==
Greville entered upon the discharge of the duties of a Clerk of the Council in ordinary in 1821, and continued to perform them for nearly forty years, until his retirement in 1859. He, therefore, served under three successive sovereigns (George IV, William IV, and Victoria) and, although no political or confidential functions were attached to that office, it was one that brought him into habitual intercourse with the chiefs of all the parties in the state. Well-born, well-bred, handsome, and accomplished, Greville led the easy life of a man of fashion, taking an occasional part in the transactions of his day and much consulted in the affairs of private life.

In 1837, Greville won 9,000 pounds from the first-place finish of his horse Mango in the St Leger Stakes. Until 1855, when he sold his stud, he was an active member of the turf, and he trained successively with Lord George Bentinck and with the Duke of Portland.

Greville died at Mayfair, London, and the celebrity now attached to his name is entirely due to the posthumous publication of a portion of a Journal or Diary that it was his practice to keep during the greater part of his life. These papers were given by him to his friend Henry Reeve a short time before his death, with an injunction that they should be published, as far as was feasible, at not too remote a period after the writer's death.

== Diary ==
The journals of the reigns of George IV and William IV, extending from 1817 to 1837, were published in obedience to his directions almost ten years after his death. Few publications have been received with greater interest by the public; five large editions were sold in little more than a year, and the demand in America was as great as in England. These journals were regarded as a faithful record of the impressions made on the mind of a competent observer, at the time, by the events he witnessed and the persons with whom he associated. Greville did not stoop to collect or record private scandals. His object appears to have been to leave behind him some of the materials of history, by which the men and actions of his own time would be judged. He records not so much public events as the private causes which led to them; and perhaps no English memoir-writer has left behind him a more valuable contribution to the history of the 19th century. Greville published anonymously, in 1845, a volume on the Past and Present Policy of England in Ireland, in which he advocated the payment of the Roman Catholic clergy; and he was also the author of several pamphlets on the events of his day.

The full span of memoirs eventually appeared in three parts—three volumes covering 1817 to 1837, published in 1874, three for the period from 1837 to 1852, published in 1885, and the final two in 1887, covering 1852 to 1860. When the first part appeared in 1874 some passages caused extreme offence. The copies issued were as far as possible recalled and passages suppressed, however, a copy of this original manuscript remained in the Wallace family's possession until it was sold and eventually acquired by a bookseller from New York, Gabriel Wells. Wells and the Doubleday publishing house produced The Greville Diary in two volumes in 1927; however, these were criticised for poor editing and containing some inaccurate statements.

In 1874, when it became known that Greville's diary was going to be printed, the news caused an uproar. Queen Victoria wrote that she was "horrified and indignant at this dreadful and really scandalous book. Mr Greville's indiscretion, indelicacy, ingratitude, betrayal of confidence and shameful disloyalty towards his Sovereign make it very important that the book should be severely censored and discredited". She also said that "The tone in which he speaks of royalty is unlike anything which one sees in history, even of people hundreds of years ago, and is most reprehensible...Of George IV he speaks in such shocking language, language not fit for any gentleman to use". The Conservative Prime Minister Benjamin Disraeli wrote to Lady Bradford on 26 October 1874:

I have not seen Chas. Greville's book, but have read a good deal of it. It is a social outrage. And committed by one who was always talking of what he called 'perfect gentlemen.' I don't think he can figure now in that category. I knew him intimately. He was the vainest being—I don't limit myself to man—that ever existed; and I don't forget Cicero and Lytton Bulwer; but Greville wd. swallow garbage, and required it. Offended selflove is a key to most of his observations. He lent me a volume of his MS. once to read; more modern than these; I found, when he was not scandalous, he was prolix and prosy—a clumsy, wordy writer. The loan was made à propos of the character of Peel, which I drew in George Bentinck's Life, and which, I will presume to say, is the only thing written about Peel wh. has any truth or stuff in it. Greville was not displeased with it, and as a reward, and a treat, told me that he wd. confide to me his character of Peel, and he gave me the sacred volume, wh. I bore with me, with trembling awe, from Bruton St. to Gros[veno]r Gate. If ever it appears, you, who have taste for style and expression, will, I am sure, agree with me that, as a portrait painter, Greville is not a literary Vandyke or Reynolds; a more verbose, indefinite, unwieldy affair, without a happy expression, never issued from the pen of a fagged subordinate of the daily press.

== His brother's diary ==
His brother, Henry William Greville (1801–1872), attaché to the British embassy in Paris from 1834 to 1844, also kept a diary, of which part was published by Viscountess Enfield, Leaves from The Diary of Henry Greville (London, 1883–1884).

== Notes ==
Government offices
Preceded by Sir George Chetwynd; Richard, Viscount Chetwynd; James Buller	Clerk of the Privy Council; 1821–1859; With: Sir George Chetwynd 1821–1824; James Buller 1821–1830; Hon. William Bathurst 1830–1859	Succeeded by Hon. William Bathurst; Arthur Helps
