= Henry William Greville =

English aristocrat & diarist (1801-1872)

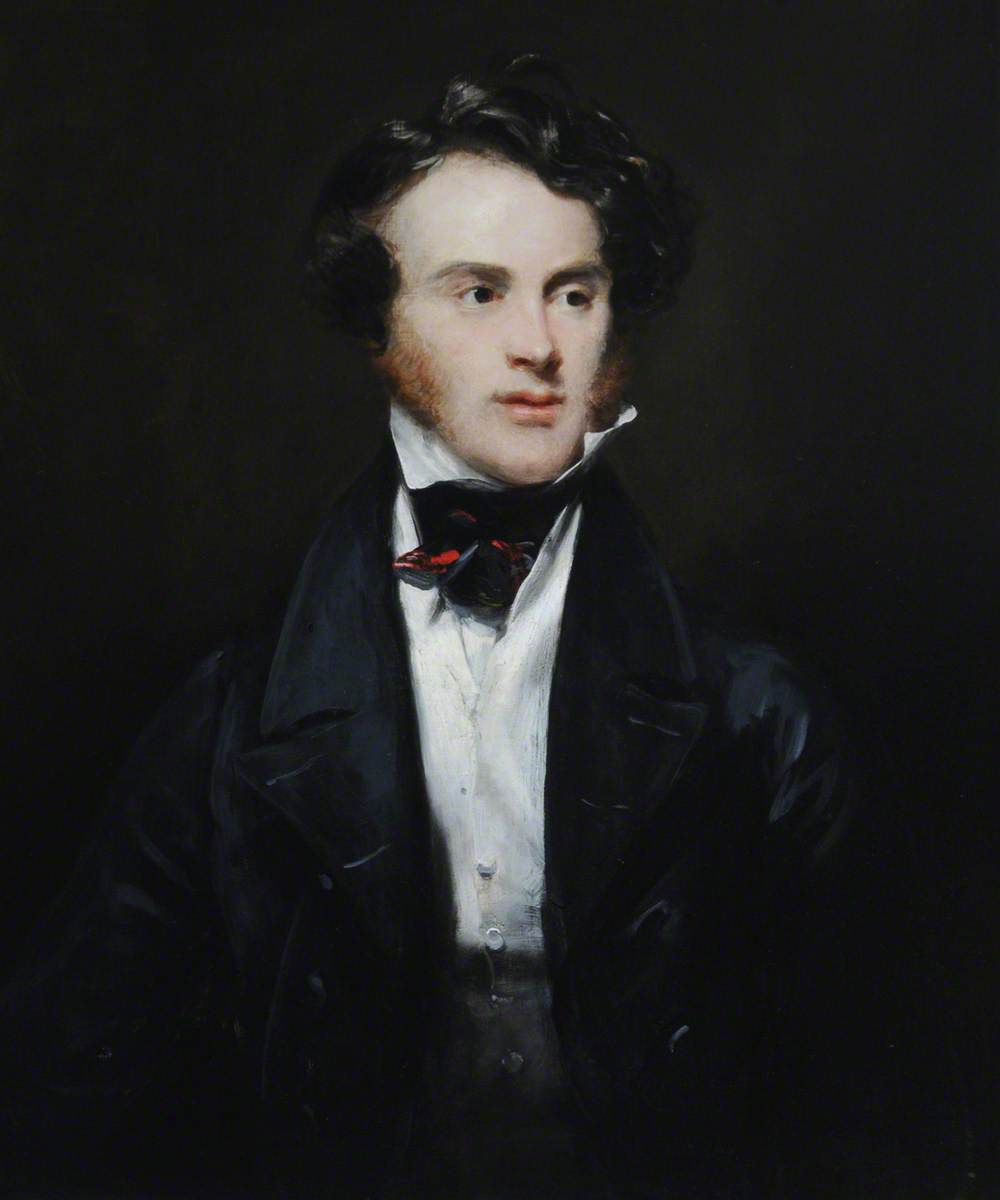
Portrait by John Jackson

Henry William Greville (28 October 1801 – 12 December 1872) was an English aristocrat and diarist.

== Family ==
He was the youngest son of Charles Greville, grandson of the fifth Lord Warwick, by Lady Charlotte Cavendish Bentinck, eldest daughter of William Cavendish-Bentinck, 3rd Duke of Portland. He was born on 28 Oct. 1801, and was educated at Westminster School and Christ Church, Oxford, where he graduated B.A. on 4 June 1823.

== Life in Brussels ==
Much of his boyhood was spent on the European continent, chiefly at Brussels, where his family resided. He thus learned to speak French and Italian with fluency. He was taken by the Duke of Wellington to the ball given by the Duchess of Richmond at Brussels on the night before the battle of Waterloo.

== Career ==
He became private secretary to Lord Francis Egerton, afterwards earl of Ellesmere, when Chief Secretary for Ireland. From 1834 to 1844 he was attaché to the British embassy in Paris. He afterwards held the post of gentleman usher at court.

== Relationship with Frederic Leighton ==
Greville was fond of society, of music, and the drama. Fanny Kemble knew him well, and described his fine voice and handsome appearance in her Records of a Girlhood, iii. 173. He was known to have been homosexual, and enjoyed a close relationship with the younger artist Frederic Leighton whom he met in Florence in 1856. Greville's letters are full of nicknames for Leighton - calling him 'Fay' and 'Bimbo' and addressing him as "dear boy". However, the affection seems not to have been reciprocated.

== Death ==
He died on 12 Dec. 1872 at his house in Mayfair.

== Diary ==
Like his brother, Charles Cavendish Fulke Greville, he kept during many years of his life a diary of such events, public and private, as specially interested him, a portion of which has been edited by his niece, Viscountess Enfield, under the title, Leaves from the Diary of Henry Greville, 1883–4, 2 vols. 8vo. The Diary derives its chief importance as an historical authority from the author's position at Paris between 1834 and 1844.
