= List of places of worship in East Hampshire =

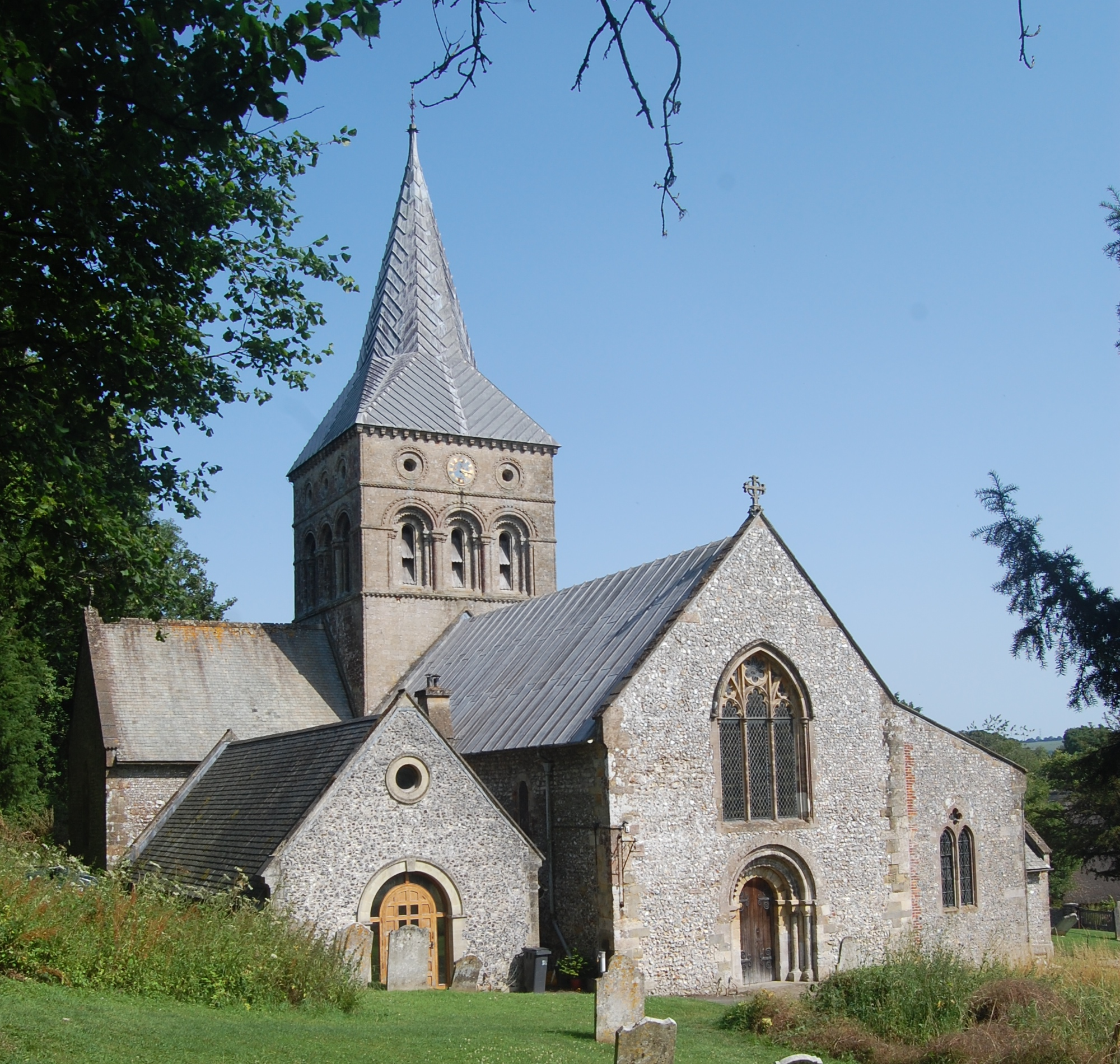
All Saints Church at East Meon, "one of the most thrilling village churches in Hampshire", dates from the last quarter of the 11th century.

There are nearly 120 current and former places of worship in the district of East Hampshire in the English county of Hampshire. A range of Christian denominations own and operate 87 churches, chapels and meeting halls across the district, and a further 32 buildings no longer serve a religious function but survive in alternative uses. East Hampshire is one of 13 local government districts in Hampshire, a large, mostly rural county southwest of London. The district is predominantly rural, with dozens of villages and hamlets; the small market towns of Alton and Petersfield are the main centres of population. Both towns and many of the villages have ancient Church of England parish churches; others were rebuilt or founded anew in the 19th century during a rush of Victorian-era church-building; and other denominations established chapels throughout the district from the late 18th century.

The 2011 United Kingdom census found that the majority of the district's population was Christian, and there are no places of worship in the area for followers of other faiths. The Church of England—the country's Established Church—has the largest stock of church buildings, but many other denominations and groups are represented. There are several Roman Catholic churches, and the major Nonconformist denominations such as Methodists, Baptists and the United Reformed Church are represented by chapels in the main towns and various villages. Less mainstream groups worship in the district as well, such as the International Presbyterian Church, Plymouth Brethren Christian Church and the spiritualist organisation The White Eagle Lodge—whose headquarters and main temple, "like an Art Deco version of the Pantheon", is in the village of Liss.

Historic England or its predecessor English Heritage have awarded listed status to 48 current and eight former places of worship in East Hampshire. A building is defined as "listed" when it is placed on a statutory register of buildings of "special architectural or historic interest" in accordance with the Planning (Listed Buildings and Conservation Areas) Act 1990. The Department for Digital, Culture, Media and Sport, a Government department, is responsible for this; Historic England, a non-departmental public body, acts as an agency of the department to administer the process and advise the department on relevant issues. There are three grades of listing status. Grade I, the highest, is defined as being of "exceptional interest"; Grade II* is used for "particularly important buildings of more than special interest"; and Grade II, the lowest, is used for buildings of "special interest".

== Overview of the district and its places of worship ==
The district is located in the central part of eastern Hampshire.

East Hampshire covers 198.6 square miles (514 km^{2}) of mostly rural land in the east–central area of Hampshire and had an estimated population of nearly 120,000 in 2017. Clockwise from the south, it shares borders with the borough of Havant, the City of Winchester district, the borough of Basingstoke and Deane and the district of Hart, all in Hampshire; the Surrey district of Waverley; and the West Sussex district of Chichester. The ancient market towns of Petersfield and Alton and the military town of Bordon (with neighbouring Whitehill) are the largest settlements, followed by the villages of Four Marks, Horndean, Liphook and Liss.

Many of East Hampshire's Anglican churches have ancient origins, even where little or no original fabric survives. (Note: In this section, when only the name of a town or village is shown, the Anglican parish church is being referred to.) The oldest to be documented are Selborne and Idsworth, first mentioned in 1049 and 1053 respectively—although some parts of Idsworth church were built in the 10th century. East Meon was founded in 1080 and was complete in its present form by 1150. Alton's original parish church, St Lawrence, was also founded in the late 11th century, and part of its tower survives from that time. Work on the churches at Priors Dean, Petersfield and Bentley started in the 1120s, and the oldest parts of Binsted and West Tisted are also early 12th-century. Upper Wield dates from the middle of that century, and Bentworth, Buriton, Catherington, Farringdon, Hartley Mauditt, Holybourne, Medstead and Steep also retain some 12th-century fabric. Several other churches have 13th-century origins: Bramshott, Chalton, East Worldham, Empshott, Newton Valence, Upper Froyle and West Worldham. The substantially rebuilt church at East Tisted retains some 14th-century work in the tower, but the contemporary church at Headley burnt down in 1836 and was rebuilt in the 1850s. A fire in 2014 also destroyed much of the medieval work at Ropley, where the nave dates from the 11th century.

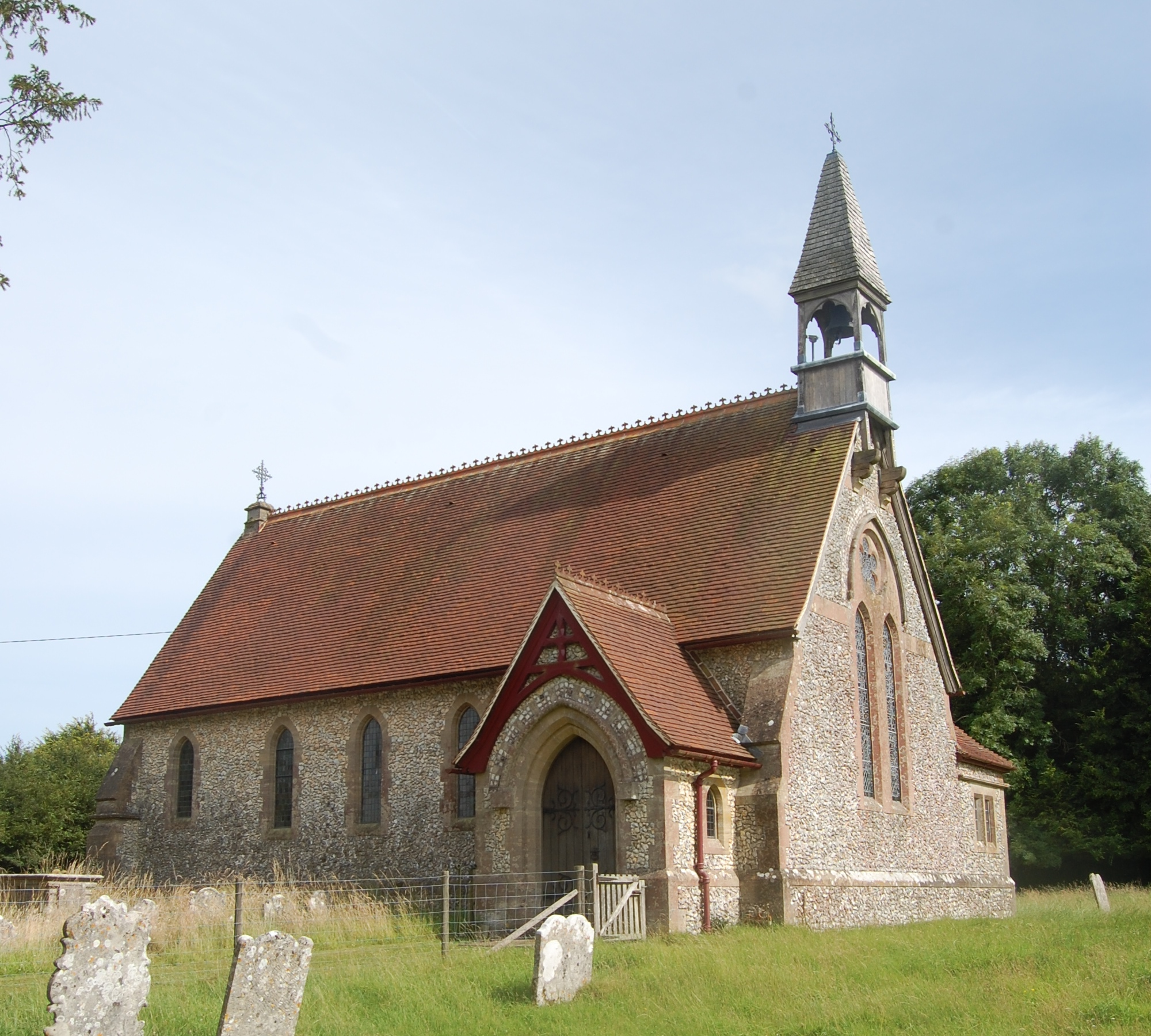
Churches by Arthur Blomfield include St Peter-on-the-Green at Froxfield Green.

The Victorian era brought about an increase in the pace of church restoration work and the building of new churches. In East Hampshire, some of Britain's most prominent Victorian church architects were involved. Arthur Blomfield was especially prolific, restoring the churches at Newton Valence (1871–72), Petersfield (1873–74) and Buriton (1877–78), rebuilding Chawton after a fire in 1871, extending High Cross (1893) and building new churches at Sheet (1868–69), Privett (1876–78), Froxfield Green (1886–87) and West Liss (St Mary's; 1892). Ewan Christian designed Langrish in 1869 and restored Binsted (1863–64), St Peter's at West Liss (1864), St Lawrence's at Alton (1867–68), East Meon (1869–70) and Holybourne (1879). Henry Woodyer designed Lasham in 1866–68, restored Bentley (1889–90) and assisted with the restoration and enlargement of Farringdon from 1858. Richard Carpenter and Benjamin Ingelow worked at Bentworth, as did Aston Webb 40 years later. Alfred Waterhouse's church at Blackmoor was the centrepiece of his "model Victorian country estate" commissioned by the Earl of Selborne in the 1860s. George Gilbert Scott Jr. reworked Hartley Mauditt in 1868–70, while at Hawkley Samuel Sanders Teulon undertook a complete rebuild, in Neo-Norman fashion, of the medieval church between 1864 and 1865. The construction of new churches to provide more accommodation in growing towns was not really a feature in such a rural district: only All Saints at Alton (1873–74) was built for this reason. More common was the opening of chapels of ease in large rural parishes, as at Langrish (East Meon) and Oakhanger (Blackmoor); or the replacement of remote churches with new buildings nearer the 19th-century centre of population, as at Blendworth and Kingsley. A much later example of this happened at Liphook, formerly in the parish of Bramshott: a chapel of ease opened in 1920 and was superseded by the present church centre in 1970. Another rapidly growing village, the early 20th-century settlement of Four Marks, had to wait until 1954 to be provided with an Anglican church.

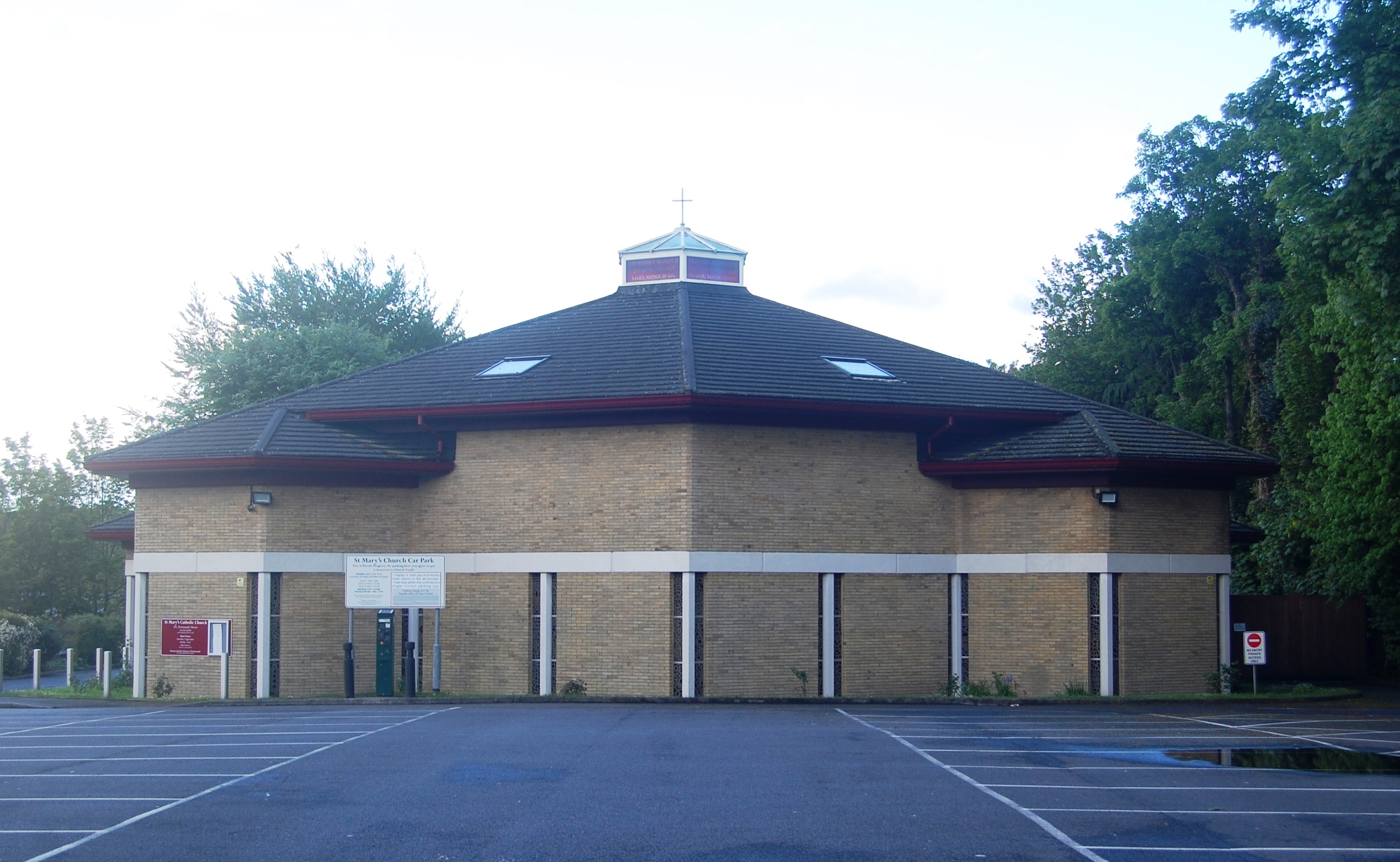
St Mary's Church, the Roman Catholic parish church of Alton, dates from 1966.

Roman Catholic missions were established in several places independently in the late 19th century. At Woolmer, near Liphook, a public oratory established in a house in 1870 was the forerunner of the Church of the Immaculate Conception (1911) in Liphook itself. Similarly, at Grayshott a chapel opened in a house in 1893 and was replaced by a permanent church, St Joseph's, in 1911. The owner of Ditcham Park in Buriton paid for the construction of St Laurence's Church in Petersfield in 1890. In the 1960s this church founded two chapels of ease in outlying villages: St Agnes' at Hill Brow, near Liss (still in use) and the Church of the Assumption at East Meon (closed in the 1990s). Grayshott also had a chapel of ease: Christ the King at Headley, opened in 1965 to replace a former World War II army hut but closed in 1994 and demolished. Bordon's first Catholic church was also an ex-army hut, this time from World War I, and was used by army personnel and local Catholics; its permanent replacement was built in 1986. Alton's first Catholic church did not open until 1911: it still stands, albeit in residential use, but was only used until 1938 when a new building replaced it. This was in turn replaced by the present St Mary's Church in 1966. In the south of the district, Horndean has been served since 1958 by St Edmund's Church—originally a chapel of ease in the large parish of Waterlooville.

Congregationalism was strong locally from the early 19th century. An Independent chapel was in use in Petersfield by 1801, and its successor Petersfield United Reformed Church (Note: The United Reformed Church denomination was formed from the amalgamation of the Congregational Church and the Presbyterian Church of England in 1972.) (1882) is still in use. Until the 1960s it maintained an out-station in the hamlet of Ramsdean: this chapel, built in 1830 and enlarged in 1887, is now a house. Other small rural Congregational chapels survive in alternative use at Oakhanger (opened 1820), Selborne (1860) and Kingsley (c. 1882), but the chapel built in 1881 at Rowland's Castle remains in use by the United Reformed Church. The large chapel at Alton, built in 1834–35 for a congregation with 18th-century roots, survived until 1996 but is now in secular use. Other United Reformed churches have closed since then: at Finchdean, Medstead (both 2019) and Lovedean (2016). Lovedean had its origins in outreach from a Presbyterian church at Portsmouth, and the United Reformed church at Hill Brow (still open) also has Presbyterian roots. There was a Presbyterian chapel at Holybourne, now used by Jehovah's Witnesses, from 1893 until 1972. The shared church of St Mark at Bordon is used by United Reformed, Methodist and Anglican worshippers. The International Presbyterian Church, a new denomination established in the United Kingdom in 1969, has used a former Anglican church in Liss since 2010.

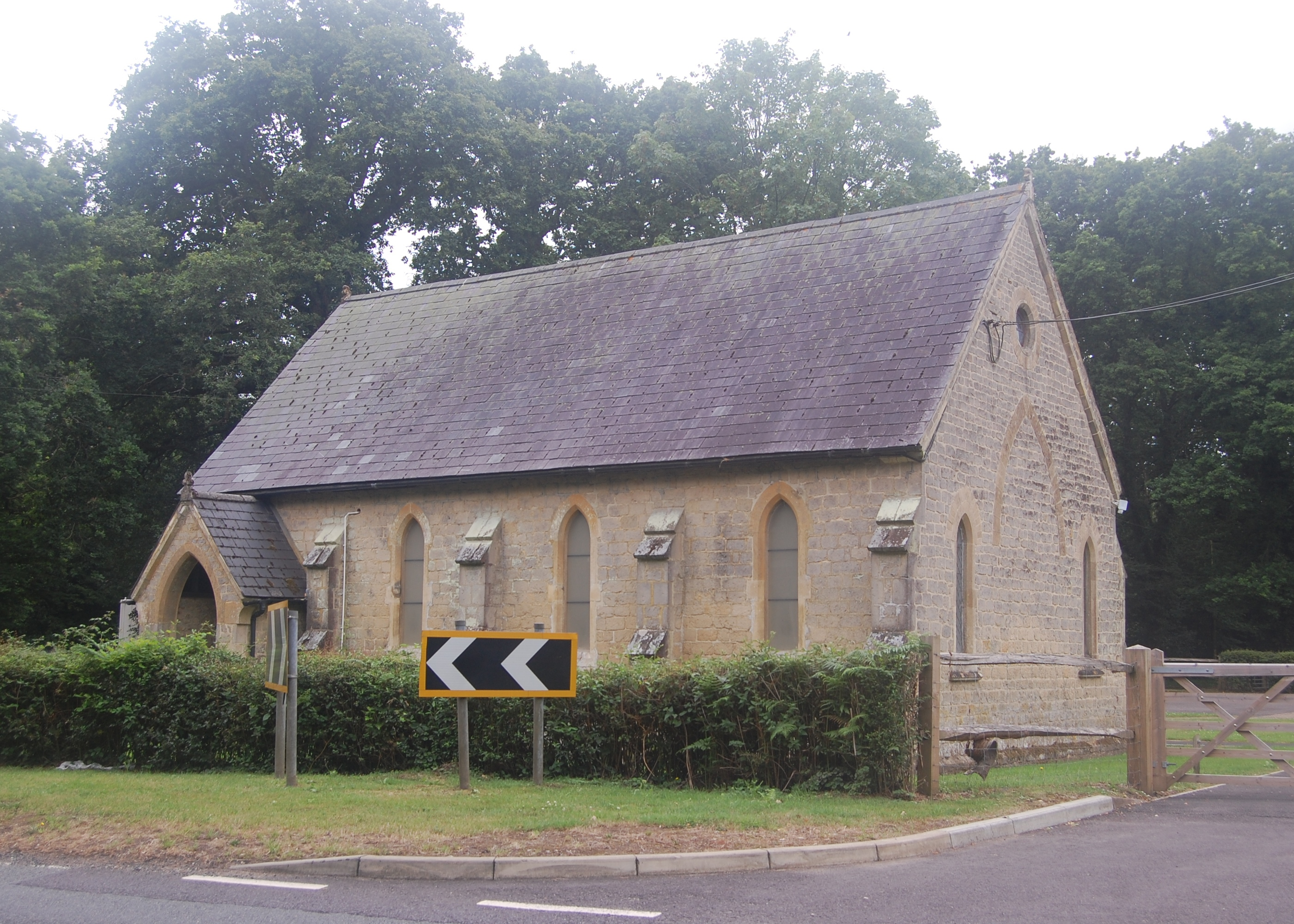
The Methodist chapel at Standford (1861) is now used by the PBCC.

The Methodist Church of Great Britain documented all the chapels it owned as of 1940 in a statistical return published in 1947. Within the boundaries of the present district of East Hampshire at that time, there were 21 chapels representing the denomination's three historic strands: Wesleyanism, Primitive Methodism and the United Methodist Church. There were chapels of Wesleyan origin at Alton, Binstead, Grayshott, Greatham, Holybourne, Liss, Lower Froyle and Petersfield; Primitive Methodist churches at Bowyers, Buriton, Charlwood, East Meon, Petersfield, Ropley, Stroud and Upper Wield; and United Methodist chapels at Batts Corner, Blacknest, Lindford, Liphook and Standford Hill. Many of these have been demolished and others secularised or taken over by other religious congregations. In Petersfield only the former Wesleyan chapel remains in use: the nearby Primitive Methodist church building closed by 1944 and is now a Masonic hall. The church in Alton dates from 1979–80: it replaced the original chapel of 1846, which was demolished. The Wesleyan chapels at Holybourne and Liss are now houses, although Liss had been converted into a Kingdom Hall for Jehovah's Witnesses in 1970 after it closed for Methodist worship. The former Primitive Methodist chapel at Buriton is now an office, while those at East Meon, Stroud and Upper Wield are all residential. The former United Methodist chapel at Batts Corner is also now a house; Standford Hill has been acquired by the Plymouth Brethren Christian Church and reregistered for their use; but Lindford and Liphook are both still in Methodist occupation.

The only Baptist churches in the district are at Alton (built in 1891 for a congregation established in the mid-19th century) and Horndean. The Salvation Army have postwar halls in Alton and Petersfield, although both replaced older buildings. Much older is the Quaker meeting house in Alton, in continuous use since 1672 and considered to be of "exceptional historical value". Evangelical and non-denominational chapels were founded in the 20th century in Lovedean, Headley Down, Liss, Clanfield, and Alton; and for Open Brethren, Gospel halls built in the 1980s have replaced older facilities in Four Marks and Standford. The separate Plymouth Brethren Christian Church have a regional meeting room at Horndean with an outlying local room at Clanfield and others outside the district, and there are two others at Liphook and Standford. At Liss is the headquarters and temple of theosophical group The White Eagle Lodge.

== Religious affiliation ==
According to the 2011 United Kingdom census, 115,608 lived in the district of East Hampshire. Of these, 64.65% identified themselves as Christian, 0.36% were Muslim, 0.34% were Buddhist, 0.24% were Hindu, 0.14% were Jewish, 0.04% were Sikh, 0.44% followed another religion, 26.28% claimed no religious affiliation and 7.5% did not state their religion. The proportions of Christians and people who followed no religion were higher than the figures in England as a whole (59.38% and 24.74% respectively). Islam, Judaism, Hinduism, Sikhism and Buddhism had a lower following in the district than in the country overall: in 2011, 5.02% of people in England were Muslim, 1.52% were Hindu, 0.79% were Sikh, 0.49% were Jewish and 0.45% were Buddhist.

== Administration ==
=== Anglican churches ===
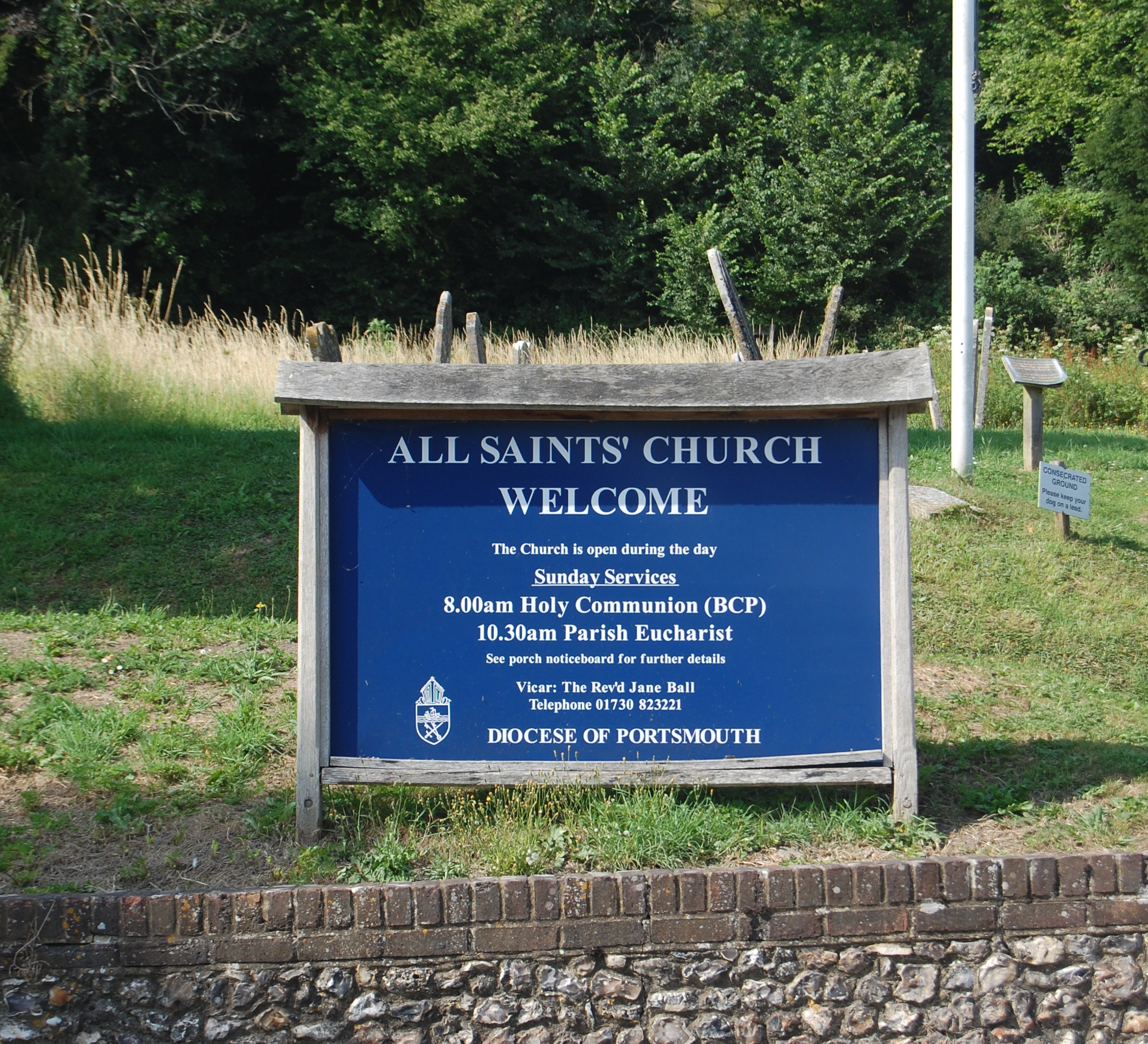
All Saints Church at East Meon is in the Anglican Diocese of Portsmouth.

East Hampshire lies across the boundaries of three Anglican dioceses: Winchester, which is based at Winchester Cathedral, Portsmouth, whose seat is Portsmouth Cathedral, and Guildford, based at Guildford Cathedral. Within Portsmouth diocese, the churches at Blendworth, Catherington, Chalton, Clanfield, Idsworth and Rowlands Castle are administered by the Havant Deanery; and Petersfield Deanery is responsible for the churches at Blackmoor, Bramshott (including St Mary's Church Centre in Liphook), Buriton, East Meon, Empshott, Froxfield, Greatham, Hawkley, High Cross, Langrish, Liss, Petersfield, Priors Dean, Sheet, Steep, and Stroud. The Farnham Deanery of Guildford Diocese looks after the churches at Bordon, Grayshott, Headley and Rowledge. In the Diocese of Winchester, Alresford Deanery administers the churches at Ropley (including the former Monkwood mission church), Upper Wield and West Tisted; and the churches at Alton (All Saints and St Lawrence), Beech, Bentley, Bentworth, Binsted, Chawton, East Tisted, East Worldham, Farringdon, Four Marks, Hartley Mauditt, Holybourne, Kingsley, Lasham, Medstead, Newton Valence, Oakhanger, Selborne, Shalden, Upper Froyle and West Worldham are in Alton Deanery.

=== Roman Catholic churches ===
The Catholic churches in Alton, Bordon, Grayshott, Horndean, Liphook, Liss and Petersfield are part of the Roman Catholic Diocese of Portsmouth, whose seat is the Cathedral of St John the Evangelist in Portsmouth. The Bordon–Petersfield Pastoral Area of Deanery 4 in the Diocese covers the parishes of Bordon (Sacred Heart Church), Grayshott (St Joseph's Church), Liphook (Church of the Immaculate Conception) and Petersfield (consisting of St Agnes' Church at Liss and St Laurence's Church in Petersfield). Also in Deanery 4, the Hampshire Downs Pastoral Area includes the parish of Alton (St Mary's Church). The parish covered by St Edmund's Church at Horndean is in the Havant Pastoral Area of Deanery 5.

=== Other denominations ===
The district's five Methodist churches—at Bordon, Horndean, Lindford, Liphook and Petersfield—are part of the 21-church East Solent and Downs Methodist Circuit. St Francis' Community Church at Headley Down, an interdenominational church, is included in this total as it has "strong ties" with the circuit despite not being formally part of it. Alton and Horndean Baptist Churches belong to the Southern Counties Baptist Association. Liss Evangelical Church and the International Presbyterian Church at West Liss belong to Affinity (formerly the British Evangelical Council), a network of conservative Evangelical congregations throughout Great Britain. Liss Evangelical Church is also affiliated with the Fellowship of Independent Evangelical Churches (FIEC), a pastoral and administrative network of about 500 churches with an evangelical outlook.

== Listed status ==
Grade	Criteria
Grade I	Buildings of exceptional interest, sometimes considered to be internationally important.
Grade II*	Particularly important buildings of more than special interest.
Grade II	Buildings of national importance and special interest.

Eight churches in the district are Grade I-listed, 22 (including three former churches) are listed at Grade II* and 26 (including five former churches) have Grade II listed status. As of February 2001, there were 1,297 listed buildings in the district of East Hampshire: 14 with Grade I status, 64 listed at Grade II* and 1,219 with Grade II status.

== Current places of worship ==
Current places of worship
Name	Image	Location	Denomination/ Affiliation	Grade	Notes	Refs
All Saints Church (More images)		Alton; 51.145484°N 0.980379°W	Anglican	II	As Alton developed westwards in the second half of the 19th century, a second Anglican church was needed. Frederick C. Dyer designed this Early English Gothic Revival church in 1873–74; a vestry was added in 1878; and the present appearance took shape in 1881 when the tower and spire were built. Malmstone quarried locally at Selborne was the main building material. There is stained glass of 1874 by Hardman & Co. commemorating Bishop of Winchester Samuel Wilberforce, who died the previous year. The "elaborate" interior fittings are mostly late 19th-century.	
St Lawrence's Church (More images)		Alton; 51.151193°N 0.975978°W	Anglican	I	Alton's parish church is Perpendicular Gothic in style and largely of the 15th century, but part of the tower survives from the original church—a Romanesque building of the late 11th century which was associated with the Minster of Winchester. As well as the nave, chancel and tower there are north and south chapels, a large south aisle, a vestry and a gallery. Ewan Christian carried out restoration work in 1867–68.	
Alton Baptist Church (More images)		Alton; 51.145622°N 0.977519°W	Baptist	–	The chapel was aligned to the Strict Baptist movement until the early 1950s or later. A church had been formed along these lines in 1845 in nearby Ropley, and soon afterwards meetings began to be held in hired premises in Alton as well. A permanent base for the church was found in 1891, when the present chapel was built on Mount Pleasant in the west end of Alton and was given the name Bethel. The building was registered for marriages in February 1893.	
Harvest Church (More images)		Alton; 51.146343°N 0.973913°W	Evangelical	–	Alton Evangelical Free Church, as it was originally known, was established in the 1950s. Since 2005 the congregation has used The Maltings, a combined church building and community centre in a 19th-century former brewery complex; it was registered for their use in April 2006. Previous buildings used for worship were on Amery Hill (registered between January 1962 and January 1979) and Church Street (1979–2006). The church is aligned with the Newfrontiers movement.	
Alton Methodist Church (More images)		Alton; 51.146631°N 0.977394°W	Methodist	–	Alton's original Methodist chapel was Wesleyan and was built in 1846, being registered the following March. It stood on the High Street and was a rendered building of rubble and brick with a capacity of 330. The façade had pilasters and was topped with a pediment. This chapel closed in 1977 and was demolished in favour of a supermarket despite having been Grade II-listed in March of that year. John Pantlin designed its pyramid-roofed, brown-brick replacement on a nearby site in 1979–80; this was registered in September 1980.	
Friends Meeting House (More images)		Alton; 51.152017°N 0.975887°W	Quaker	II*	The construction date, 1672, of this complex of two-storey tiled-hung cottage and long, low, rendered meeting house is "prominently displayed in glazed headers" in the brick wall facing Church Street. It is England's second oldest purpose-built Quaker meeting house. Construction cost £204. Alterations have taken place regularly between 1690 (when a gallery was inserted) and the mid-1960s. A 17th-century burial ground survives at the rear.	
St Mary's Church (More images)		Alton; 51.151884°N 0.969232°W	Roman Catholic	–	The church, Alton's third Catholic church, was designed by Justin Alleyn and P. Durling. It is a low polygonal building with a shallow roof rising to a central lantern. Dom Charles Norris of Buckfast Abbey designed the dalle de verre windows. The church was registered for worship and for marriages in January 1967, replacing its predecessor on the same site.	
Salvation Army Hall (More images)		Alton; 51.148958°N 0.977871°W	Salvation Army	–	This building on Amery Street was registered in April 1958, replacing a predecessor which dated from 1929.	
St Peter's Church (More images)		Beech; 51.144258°N 1.011909°W	Anglican	–	This is a largely unaltered tin tabernacle dating from 1902 (although small extensions were added in 1904 and 1908). Cdr du Santoy Anstis rn rnr donated the land and erected the building; its bell came from a ship he commanded. It is part of the four-church Anglican Parish of the Resurrection serving Alton, Beech and Holybourne.	
St Mary's Church (More images)		Bentley; 51.196131°N 0.879262°W	Anglican	II*	Standing in fields distant from the village, this church was first documented in 1129 when it was a chapelry of Farnham, Surrey. Some fabric dates from the 12th century, particularly in the chancel and north chapel. The south chapel, chancel and tower arch are 13th-century, and a "fine, typically early Perpendicular Gothic" east window was inserted in the medieval era. The church was substantially restored in 1889–90 by Henry Woodyer, and its exterior appearance is largely Victorian. He also designed a new base for the Norman font.	
St Mary's Church (More images)		Bentworth; 51.158001°N 1.049866°W	Anglican	II*	Two Victorian restorations—by Richard H. Carpenter and Benjamin Ingelow in 1849 and Aston Webb in 1890–91—hide the 12th- and 13th-century origins of this church. The nave has aisles on both sides, and at the west end there is a short tower with a Perpendicular Gothic wooden belfry. The oldest parts are the arcades of the nave, which are of the Transitional era between Norman and Gothic architecture. The walls are of flint and the roof is tiled. The east window has stained glass of 1868 by Heaton, Butler and Bayne depicting the Crucifixion of Jesus.	
Holy Cross Church (More images)		Binsted; 51.162529°N 0.898092°W	Anglican	I	This is a large church in the centre of a vast parish covering several hamlets. "One of the most interesting medieval churches in northeast Hampshire", it was built over a period of about three centuries from the early 12th century. The walls are of stone clad in render. The earliest parts are the chancel and the long, initially aisleless nave; four-bay aisles were soon added, and the chancel was made longer in the 13th century. The tower dates from the 1180s or 1190s, although the spire was added in the 18th century. Ewan Christian undertook a drastic restoration of the church in 1863–64.	
St Matthew's Church (More images)		Blackmoor; 51.096080°N 0.886689°W	Anglican	II*	Roundell Palmer, 1st Earl of Selborne commissioned Alfred Waterhouse to design and lay out "a model Victorian country estate" in the parish of Selborne, with this church as its centrepiece. It was built between 1867 and 1870 in a Geometrical/Decorated Gothic Revival style. At the west end is a tall, spire-topped tower with an octagonal corner stair-turret topped with its own small spire. There is stained glass of various dates between the 1870s and 1920s, including a Heaton, Butler and Bayne window of 1889 commemorating the Earl's wife Laura, Countess of Selborne. Former Bishop of Peterborough Cyril Easthaugh is buried in the extensive churchyard.	
Holy Trinity Church (More images)		Blendworth; 50.917079°N 0.989537°W	Anglican	II	William and Edward Habershon designed this church in 1851–52 to serve the villages of Blendworth and Horndean, succeeding a small Georgian church (St Giles) further east. It is a flint and Bath stone building in the Geometrical/Decorated Gothic Revival style. The tower is topped with a tall, landmark broach spire. In the chancel is an "outstanding" stained glass window depicting Saint Columba, designed by Louis Davis in 1911, and intricate mosaic patterns on the walls attributed to stained glass designers James Powell and Sons. The Habershon brothers also designed the adjacent flint-and-brick rectory, now a private house.	
Horndean Methodist Church (More images)		Blendworth; 50.913473°N 0.994387°W	Methodist	–	This Methodist community is based in the Blendworth Centre, the church hall of Holy Trinity Church. It belongs to the East Solent and Downs Methodist Circuit.	
St Mark's Church (More images)		Bordon; 51.108511°N 0.857757°W	Anglican/Methodist/United Reformed Church	–	The town's first Anglican church was a prefabricated wooden building on Savile Crescent. The present building opened in 1982 as a shared church between three denominations. It was registered for Nonconformist worship and marriages in April 1983 and August 1984 respectively. The architect was Gerald Goalen; a later extension has been added to his original design. The church is an integral part of the 1980s town centre, consisting of a shopping parade and various community buildings.	
Church of the Sacred Heart (More images)		Bordon; 51.112601°N 0.863655°W	Roman Catholic	–	Bordon's first Catholic church was a hut erected during World War I. In 1919 a pair of huts on a different site were linked, converted into a church and dedicated to the Sacred Heart. This served the town and its army personnel until 1986, when the present church was built on the High Street. The old church was registered between September 1925 and September 1990; the new Church of the Sacred Heart was registered in its place in April 1991.	
St Mary's Church (More images)		Bramshott; 51.089223°N 0.798205°W	Anglican	II*	The original church on this site was a cruciform sandstone building, and parts survive—principally the lower section of the central tower, which was originally at the west end. The first church, dating from c. 1220, had an aisleless nave which was replaced in the 18th century and again in 1871; the new nave is of four bays with aisles on the north and south sides. There are also north and south transepts; the latter was built as a chantry chapel for the owners of Bramshott Manor. There are many stained glass windows, some with fragments of medieval glass.	
St Mary the Virgin's Church (More images)		Buriton; 50.974788°N 0.947134°W	Anglican	II*	The aisled four-bay nave of this large church dates from the late 12th century and the chancel is a century newer. The battlemented tower at the west end was built in 1714 or 1715 but may stand on older foundations. Several building materials are visible: flint, malmstone, ironstone, Caen stone and chalk (in the arcades of the aisles); the wide roof is tiled. Arthur Blomfield carried out restoration in 1877–78. The font dates from the 12th century.	
All Saints Church (More images)		Catherington; 50.925899°N 1.010307°W	Anglican	II*	Edmund Ferrey's restoration in 1883 does not disguise the medieval (mostly 12th-century) origins of this medium-sized church on a prominent, high site. The large north chapel may be even older, based on the Saxon-style quoins: it may have formed the original church, to which the present nave and chancel were added in the 12th century. Most of the internal fittings date from Ferrey's restoration, as does the flintwork of the exterior walls. The contrasting battlemented brickwork on the upper stage of the tower dates from the 18th century. In the north chapel, Sir Nicholas Hyde, Lord Chief Justice, and his wife are buried in a canopied table tomb decorated with their effigies.	
St Michael and All Angels Church (More images)		Chalton; 50.938346°N 0.959559°W	Anglican	II*	The chancel, "a fine and well-proportioned piece of mid-13th-century work", is the oldest part of this downland church; the nave, west tower and transept are slightly newer. The porch is Victorian but retains some medieval woodwork. The walls, which are of flint, have a variety of lancet windows. The font is 15th-century, and there are various wall monuments inside. The Jervoise family of nearby Idsworth have a mid-19th-century Early English Gothic Revival mausoleum in the churchyard.	
St Nicholas' Church (More images)		Chawton; 51.128197°N 0.989768°W	Anglican	II*	Only parts of the chancel survive from the original church, a Norman building which burnt down in 1871. Arthur Blomfield rebuilt it in that year in the Early English Gothic Revival style. A tall but narrow tower with pinnacles and an entrance porch in its lowest stage dominates the west end. Some of the fittings, such as the reredos and rood screen, are by George Frederick Bodley. Some wall monuments and memorial tablets, including one to Chawton resident Jane Austen's mother Cassandra, were reset in the new church when it was built.	
St James's Church (More images)		Clanfield; 50.946643°N 1.008655°W	Anglican	II	The church was built in 1875 to the design of Ryde architect R.J. Jones; nothing survives of its predecessor except the bells. The "deliberately oversized" double bell-cot on the west gable is a distinctive feature, but there is no tower or spire. The walls are of brick overlaid with flint. It is a simple nave-and-chancel church with no aisles or side chapels, although there is a vestry on the south side (rebuilt after fire damage in 2009). The interior is laid with polychromatic brickwork.	
Drift Road Evangelical Church (More images)		Clanfield; 50.935789°N 1.001193°W	Evangelical	–	This is an independent Evangelical church. The building was initially registered for marriages in November 1938 with the name Methodist Church Hall.	
Brethren Meeting Room (More images)		Clanfield; 50.947625°N 1.007948°W	Plymouth Brethren Christian Church	–	There was a Wesleyan Methodist chapel in Clanfield in 1908. This building was registered in July 1951 as a Methodist church, but it is now used by the Plymouth Brethren Christian Church as a local meeting room associated with the main meeting hall for the area at Horndean.	
All Saints Church (More images)		East Meon; 50.995879°N 1.031487°W	Anglican	I	The church was founded in about 1080 by the Bishop of Winchester, but most of the structure dates from around 1130–1150. It is a cruciform building of high-quality flint and ashlar, dominated by its "exceptionally splendid" Norman central tower and spire—believed to be the oldest surviving timber-framed spire in England. Some Norman-era windows also survive in the nave and south transept. The nave has a south aisle with a porch, and the chancel has a south chapel. A major restoration was carried out by Ewan Christian in 1869–70, and Ninian Comper did further work in the early 20th century. The rare Tournai font inside dates from the 1130s and has "a richness and quality comparable to the finest" such fonts in France.	
St James's Church (More images)		East Tisted; 51.085573°N 1.000116°W	Anglican	II*	The medieval church was substantially rebuilt by James Winter Scott, owner of the Rotherfield Park country estate in the parish, in 1846: only the chancel arch (dating from the early 14th century) and part of the tower remain from the original building. It is now a Geometrical/Decorated Gothic Revival-style church of flint with some Georgian-style details, but modern materials such as cast iron and artificial stone were used for some of the interior fittings. Several 16th-century monuments can be found inside.	
St Mary's Church (More images)		East Worldham; 51.137598°N 0.928547°W	Anglican	II*	The church is largely 13th-century, its architecture reflecting the Transitional era between the Norman and Gothic styles. The original nave and chancel survive, but the apse has gone. Restoration was carried out in the mid-1860s by David Brandon, when the church was reroofed and a porch and vestry were added. The font and stained glass are also of that era.	
Holy Rood Church (More images)		Empshott; 51.075578°N 0.926160°W	Anglican	I	The appearance of this church is almost entirely 13th-century, although some Norman windows survive and the font is of that era. The interior fittings mostly date from a refitting of 1624, but the chalk-built arcades of "astonishing richness" were built about 1200. The big partly glazed timber bell-turret is 17th-century, although its spire was added in 1884. The exterior was restored in the Victorian era.	
All Saints Church (More images)		Farringdon; 51.113880°N 0.983697°W	Anglican	II*	The church is of 12th-century origin and consists of a west tower with Victorian broach spire, a low aisled nave with a catslide roof and a much taller chancel, possibly designed by the in 1858 by the newly incumbent rector T.H. Massey (although Henry Woodyer was also involved at this time). The prominent brick-built entrance porch is 17th- and 18th-century. The interior was "sensitively restored" in 2001. Gilbert White served here for 24 years as a curate.	
Church of the Good Shepherd (More images)		Four Marks; 51.105619°N 1.050447°W	Anglican	–	The village developed in the early 20th century, initially as a plotland settlement, and has been served by this church since its completion in 1954. It was greatly enlarged in 1996–97. The original architect was Felix Lander; he adopted a simple Gothic Revival style and built the church of brick with a wooden belfry. The lowest stage of the central tower forms the entrance porch.	
Four Marks Gospel Hall (More images)		Four Marks; 51.110778°N 1.045071°W	Open Brethren	–	This was registered in November 1987, replacing a predecessor which dated from 1931.	
St Peter-on-the-Green Church (More images)		Froxfield Green; 51.024796°N 0.997570°W	Anglican	II	There was a medieval church here, but it was demolished in the early 1860s when St Peter's Church was built at nearby High Cross. By 1886, though, it was decided a church was still needed in this part of the parish, so Arthur Blomfield was commissioned to design one to stand in the old churchyard. It was completed in 1887 and was paid for by William Nicholson of Basing Park. A small Early English Gothic Revival with no tower or spire, just a tall bell-turret on the west gable, it has an undivided nave and chancel and a vestry built in 1932. The materials are flint and stone.	
St Luke's Church (More images)		Grayshott; 51.110997°N 0.755321°W	Anglican	II	Edward I'Anson helped to develop Grayshott after the Inclosure Act 1859: the hilly, well-wooded land was suitable for high-class, well-hidden luxury houses. His son Edward Blakeney I'Anson was responsible for designing the village's centrally located Anglican church, built in 1898–99 (Note: Historic England's listing report gives 1901 as the year and the architect as I'Anson and Son, but the elder I'Anson had died in 1888.) and given its tall broach spire in 1910. The five-bay nave is large in comparison to the chancel, and is lit by clerestory windows and a big five-lancet west window. The style is Early English Gothic Revival; Bargate stone is used outside and local sandstone from Headley inside. Until 1901 the church was in the parish of Headley.	
St Joseph's Church (More images)		Grayshott; 51.110805°N 0.766015°W	Roman Catholic	II	Grayshott's Catholic mission started in 1893 at a temporary chapel in the home of a local Catholic family. This chapel was initially served by canons from St Michael's Abbey, Farnborough and was consecrated in 1895, but it was superseded in 1911 by a permanent church designed by Frederick Walters. It is a small stone building in the Perpendicular Gothic Revival style. There is no tower or spire, just a bell-cot on the roof marking the division between the nave (which has four bays, one aisle and transepts on both sides) and the chancel. Some of the elaborate alabaster fittings may have been designed by Walters as well. The church was registered for marriages in May 1914.	
St John the Baptist's Church (More images)		Greatham; 51.068098°N 0.897679°W	Anglican	II	The church was built slightly to the north of its ruined medieval predecessor in 1874–75 to the design of Liverpool architects H. and A.P. Fry. The style is Gothic Revival and combines elements of the Early English and early Decorated periods. The tower and broach spire are of 1897 by prolific church architect Frederic Chancellor. Neither the chancel nor the nave have aisles, but a vestry was added at one corner in 1994. The church has a full set of Clayton and Bell stained glass, and most of the fittings are Victorian.	
St Leonard's Church (More images)		Hartley Mauditt; 51.119436°N 0.939816°W	Anglican	II*	Some elements of the 12th-century church survive, but the present appearance is mostly attributable to George Gilbert Scott Jr.'s restoration of 1868–70. In particular, the chancel arch is Norman, and the south door dates from the end of the 12th century. The walls are of flint but have been rendered; the roof is tiled. The font is 15th-century but was brought to the church only in 1842. Burlison and Grylls-designed stained glass was inserted during Scott's restoration work.	
St Peter and St Paul's Church (More images)		Hawkley; 51.056971°N 0.937076°W	Anglican	II*	A medieval church (a chapel of ease to Newton Valence) stood here and was similar in appearance to that at nearby Priors Dean. It was demolished and replaced in 1864–65 by a larger Neo-Norman church designed by Samuel Sanders Teulon. The walls are of malmstone and chalk, and the tiled roof is very steep and sweeps down low over the north and south aisles of the three-bay nave. The church is dominated by its tall Rhenish helm-topped tower, in which stands a large arched doorway with an elaborately carved tympanum. Surviving fixtures from the original church include a 13th-century piscina and a font dating from the 1190s.	
All Saints Church (More images)		Headley; 51.119903°N 0.827313°W	Anglican	II	The 14th-century church was burnt out in 1836 and was effectively rebuilt between 1857 and 1859 to the design of Sheffield architecture firm Flocktons. The ashlar, ironstone and sandstone church a battlemented and turreted west tower, chancel with porch and vestry and an aisleless nave. The tower is the oldest part: it dates from 1380, but lost its steeple in the fire. Another old surviving element is the priest's door, originally in the north wall but reset in the vestry during the rebuilding. Architect Robert Rowand Anderson, most of whose work is in Scotland, designed the altar screen in 1892.	
St Francis' Community Church (More images)		Headley Down; 51.122176°N 0.804969°W	Non-denominational	–	This wooden building is used for nondenominational Christian worship and was registered for marriages in October 2008.	
St Peter's Church (More images)		High Cross; 51.034200°N 0.986561°W	Anglican	II	This was built in 1862 to the design of E.H. Martineau to replace the medieval church of the same dedication at Froxfield Green 1 mile (1.6 km) away. Additional work was undertaken by Arthur Blomfield in 1893. Part of the old church's arcade was installed in the new building. The nave is much larger than the chancel, which has only two bays. The tower stands at the southwest corner; its lower stage forms the entrance to the church. All windows are lancets, and there is a full scheme of stained glass of various dates.	
St Agnes' Church (More images)		Hill Brow; 51.032291°N 0.875813°W	Roman Catholic	–	This prefabricated wooden chapel of ease in the parish of Petersfield was not registered until December 1972, but was it erected in 1966 and the first Mass was celebrated on 5 June of that year. It succeeded an oratory attached to a private house nearby, which had also been dedicated to Agnes of Rome and which was made available by the householder, Eleanor Jackson, for public worship. She also donated the land on which the present church stands.	
St Paul's United Reformed Church (More images)		Hill Brow; 51.034848°N 0.877795°W	United Reformed Church	–	The "iron mission hall at Hill Brow" documented in the Victoria County History of 1911 may have been the predecessor of this building; it was registered as Hill Brow Evangelical Church in December 1885. By 1942 it had been rebuilt and re-registered as St Paul's Presbyterian Church of England, retaining the old marriage registration. The church joined the United Reformed Church when that denomination was formed in 1972 by the merger of the Congregational and Presbyterian Churches.	
Holy Rood Church (More images)		Holybourne; 51.165789°N 0.953758°W	Anglican	II*	The oldest parts of the church are the tower and nave, which retain Norman-era fabric. The unusually long and wide chancel was built in the 13th century. A north aisle and several Perpendicular Gothic windows were added in the 15th century. Ewan Christian restored the building in 1879, rebuilding the north aisle and renewing the external stonework. There are various stained glass windows dating from between 1879 and 1918.	
Kingdom Hall (More images)		Holybourne; 51.161185°N 0.953764°W	Jehovah's Witnesses	–	The building dates from 1893, when it was registered as a chapel belonging to the Presbyterian Church of England. It had closed by the 1970s and was deregistered in June 1972, at which point it was acquired by the Alton Congregation of Jehovah's Witnesses and reregistered for their use.	
Horndean Baptist Church (More images)		Horndean; 50.912136°N 1.001799°W	Baptist	–	The church was established in 1984 and is based at a building called Napier Hall.	
Kingdom Hall (More images)		Horndean; 50.919859°N 0.998806°W	Jehovah's Witnesses	–	This serves the Horndean Congregation of Jehovah's Witnesses and was registered in February 2001. Since the closure of the Kingdom Hall in Jubilee Road in Waterlooville in 2010, it has also been used by the Waterlooville Congregation.	
Brethren Meeting Room		Horndean; 50.906740°N 0.992522°W	Plymouth Brethren Christian Church	–	Since its registration in November 1993, this building (entrance area pictured) has served as the Plymouth Brethren Christian Church's main meeting room for the Waterlooville and Horndean area.	
St Edmund's Church (More images)		Horndean; 50.911404°N 1.003691°W	Roman Catholic	–	This church was registered in February 1958 as a chapel of ease within the parish of Waterlooville. It was initially conceived as a parish hall at which social events could take place and Mass could be celebrated. The building cost £12,000 to construct. It was later parished separately and was granted a licence to solemnise marriages in May 1959, and was formally opened and dedicated on 16 November 1968—Edmund of Abingdon's feast day.	
St Hubert's Church (More images)		Idsworth; 50.921304°N 0.944637°W	Anglican	I	The church was first mentioned in writing in 1053, but the stone and flint structure of the nave dates from the 10th century at the latest and may have superseded an even older church. It has a small chancel (rebuilt in the 12th or 13th century, with a regionally significant series of 14th-century wall paintings) and longer nave. The church, which was historically a chapel of ease to Chalton, was originally dedicated to St Peter and St Paul; the change to St Hubert was made in 1864, the year the wall paintings were rediscovered, on the strength of one which apparently depicted a scene from the saint's life. At that time it was not in regular use. Harry Stuart Goodhart-Rendel undertook restoration work in 1914.	
All Saints Church (More images)		Kingsley; 51.137969°N 0.874130°W	Anglican	II	This was built as a new parish church in the centre of the village in 1875–76 by Alton-based architects J.H. and E. Dyer, superseding St Nicholas' Church in the countryside to the west. It is Early English Gothic Revival in style and has a "violent" High Victorian Gothic interior of red and yellow brick. The nave and chancel are of four and two bays respectively; there are no aisles, but the church has a vestry and an entrance porch. A bell-cot stands at the top of the gable at the west end.	
St John the Evangelist's Church (More images)		Langrish; 51.009575°N 0.998613°W	Anglican	II	Langrish was part of the parish of East Meon until 1894, 23 years after the church was completed. Architect Ewan Christian started work on it in 1869. The walls are of flint with bands of stone; the tiled roof sweeps down over the low three-bay north aisle of the nave. The chancel is also lower in height and has a vestry on the north side. The church lacks a tower: a tall, narrow bell-cot stands at the west end instead. The interior is wholly Victorian, including the Caen stone and marble font.	
St Mary the Virgin's Church (More images)		Lasham; 51.177921°N 1.034249°W	Anglican	II	The parish and village are small, and St Mary's Church is a compact Early English Gothic Revival building of knapped flint and stone. It was built between 1866 and 1868 to the design of Henry Woodyer. The tiled roof is topped by a bell-cot. The nave is aisleness. Most of the interior fittings are Victorian, although the pulpit was designed in 1933 and incorporates a Jacobean sounding board which was originally in the church at nearby Herriard. Hardman & Co. designed the stained glass.	
Lindford Methodist Church (More images)		Lindford; 51.121279°N 0.846306°W	Methodist	–	The chapel was built in the 19th century and was recorded in 1940 as a former United Methodist (previously Bible Christian) church of brick with 114 sittings—one of six such chapels in the Liphook and North Hampshire Methodist Circuit. It was registered for marriages in August 1965.	
St Mary's Church Centre (More images)		Liphook; 51.074353°N 0.804340°W	Anglican	–	The rector of Bramshott in the late 19th century established Anglican mission rooms in several parts of the parish, including Liphook. A new church room was built for £500 in 1920, but it was superseded by the present building 50 years later. The foundation stone was laid on 14 July 1969, the centre opened on 15 March 1970 and an extension was completed in 1987. John Stammers designed the brown-brick building, which has a central square lantern and a timber roof.	
Liphook Methodist Church (More images)		Liphook; 51.078550°N 0.800987°W	Methodist	–	A Bible Christian Methodist chapel was built on Haslemere Road in 1853, although it was not registered for marriages for another 54 years. It was succeeded by the present chapel, a 250-capacity brick building with Perpendicular Gothic tracery in the windows, in 1931; it opened on 3 April of that year and was registered for marriages that November.	
Tower Road Gospel Hall (More images)		Liphook; 51.080798°N 0.804299°W	Plymouth Brethren Christian Church	–	The Liphook Brethren Assembly was founded in 1926 and met for worship for the first time in the village hall on 23 May of that year. Their Gospel hall opened on Tower Road on 17 March 1927 and was registered (under the name Tower Road Mission Hall) in March 1939. It was still used by its Open Brethren community until the 2010s, but it subsequently closed and was taken over by the unrelated Plymouth Brethren Christian Church as one of their local meeting rooms.	
Church of the Immaculate Conception (More images)		Liphook; 51.084030°N 0.805043°W	Roman Catholic	–	A Catholic chapel at Ludshott Manor near Bramshott was attested to in 1850. The local Catholic mission was formed in 1870, though, after the owner of the Woolmer estate north of Liphook converted to Catholicism the previous year and converted part of his house into a chapel. This was destroyed by fire in 1908, and the family moved; but the house became a convent and land nearby was reserved for a church, cemetery and school. Only the church, which opened in 1911, was ever built. The Decorated/Perpendicular Gothic Revival sandstone building was designed by Alexander Scoles.	
Temple of the White Eagle Lodge (More images)		Liss; 51.047703°N 0.856958°W	The White Eagle Lodge	–	The White Eagle Lodge is a theosophical Spiritualist group. Its headquarters, also a temple which since March 1974 has been registered for public worship and for the solemnisation of marriages, is on the outskirts of Liss. Architects Elidir Davies and Partners were responsible for the distinctive white circular building, likened in the Pevsner Architectural Guides to "an Art Deco version of the Pantheon" in Rome. It is topped by a shallow dome and has a portico. The extension to the right was added in 1985. Earlier, in May 1950, the group had registered a room at New Lands, in the grounds of which the temple was later built, as a place of worship.	
Liss Evangelical Church (More images)		Liss Forest; 51.049735°N 0.883891°W	Evangelical	–	This was registered as an independent Evangelical church under the name Central Hall in May 1930.	
Bethesda Mission (Lovedean Church) (More images)		Lovedean; 50.911233°N 1.027262°W	Non-denominational	–	A mission room in what was then an outlying part of Catherington parish was recorded in the Victoria County History of 1908. It was housed in a former blacksmiths' premises dating from the 18th century. It was converted into a Sunday school and later into a mission hall, being given to the present trustees in 1932. It was not formally registered for worship until August 1964. The old building was demolished in 1991 and replaced by the present chapel, which was registered for marriages in May 1992.	
St Andrew's Church (More images)		Medstead; 51.130009°N 1.065753°W	Anglican	II	A church existed at the time of the Domesday survey in 1086, but the oldest fabric is the "robust" north arcade of two bays, dated to c. 1160. The nave and chancel are medieval, but the church was restored and significantly altered in 1833 (when the chancel arch was built) and then the 1850s and 1860s: the nave was extended to form a transept at the expense of the west tower, which was demolished and replaced by a wooden bell-cot, and the east window was renewed.	
St Mary's Church (More images)		Newton Valence; 51.090307°N 0.967024°W	Anglican	II	Although the church has a Victorian appearance, attributable to Arthur Blomfield's restoration scheme of 1871–72, it is essentially a complete Early English Gothic church of the mid-13th century. The nave and chancel are of the same height and width and are not separated by a chancel arch. A side chapel was added at the end of the 13th century, and the bulky west tower is 15th century (although it was heightened and renewed in 1813). Blomfield added a vestry as well as restoring the fabric. Robert Boyle-Walsingham, captain of the first HMS Thunderer, is commemorated by a wall monument inside: he died when the ship was wrecked in a storm.	
St Mary Magdalene's Church (More images)		Oakhanger; 51.120431°N 0.900707°W	Anglican	–	This is a small red-brick chapel standing on the village green. It was designed by M. Moreton Barker in 1873 and is a simple building with an off-centre porch and bell-cot. The reredos inside was originally in St Matthew's Church at nearby Blackmoor, to which St Mary Magdalene's was originally a chapel of ease.	
St Peter's Church (More images)		Petersfield; 51.003220°N 0.937580°W	Anglican	I	The large church occupies a small churchyard in the town centre and represents several phases of architectural development. It is of Norman origin: construction work started c. 1120, and was originally cruciform: the square tower originally stood at the crossing and was built shortly afterwards. A subsidiary west tower was added by 1147, and it is this tower which survives (the central tower was taken down in stages, mostly in 1731). In the 1170s north and south aisles were built, occupying the full space between the transepts and the west tower. The south aisle also has a chapel at the east end. Arthur Blomfield's restoration of 1873–74 altered the appearance and structure of the church, particularly in the chancel. The church was only parished in 1886: previously it had been a chapel of ease in Buriton parish.	
Petersfield Methodist Church (More images)		Petersfield; 51.006540°N 0.939258°W	Methodist	–	In 1940 this was recorded as the largest of the 15 Methodist chapels in the Petersfield and Haslemere Methodist Circuit, with 250 sittings. It was built for Wesleyan Methodists in 1902–03 to the design of Josiah Gunton, (Note: The Petersfield Conservation Area Character Appraisal (2014) attributes it to T.E. Davidson; he designed the former Primitive Methodist chapel on Windsor Road.) replacing an earlier Wesleyan chapel elsewhere in the town, and was registered for marriages in August 1903. A Gothic Revival building of dark knapped flint with brick dressings, it is "quite showy" but architecturally "very conservative" for the early 20th century. Some of the stained glass windows have Art Nouveau touches. The church has a tall tower with a spire, forming an important landmark in the town.	
St Laurence's Church (More images)		Petersfield; 51.007003°N 0.939430°W	Roman Catholic	II	Laurence Trent Cave, who had acquired nearby Ditcham Park in 1887, commissioned Petersfield's Catholic church in 1890. It was designed by John Kelly of Kelly & Birchall, although work continued after his death until 1909 (the apse and transepts were not part of the original design; the church is now cruciform). Like most of his churches, it has Italianate and Romanesque elements. "Handsome" and "very restrained" in its use of dark red brick, it is nevertheless a landmark because of its large copper dome. The church was registered for marriages in May 1898.	
Salvation Army Hall (More images)		Petersfield; 51.004385°N 0.939391°W	Salvation Army	–	A Salvation Army barracks opened on the present site in Swan Street on 24 June 1886, but the present building is more modern: it was registered for marriages in November 1974.	
Petersfield United Reformed Church (More images)		Petersfield; 51.006910°N 0.933440°W	United Reformed Church	–	An independent chapel was built in the town either in the late 18th century or in 1801: Richard Densham, a friend of the founder John Eyre, was ordained as the first minister of the congregation in 1799. It stood on the site of the present chapel, built for Congregationalists in 1882 to the design of John Sulman (three years before he emigrated to Australia, where he became a prominent architect). The chapel is Early English Gothic Revival in style and is built of sandstone. An adjoining church hall was built in a complementary style in 2009. It was registered for marriages in February 1884; its predecessor had been so registered in 1837.	
Priors Dean Church (More images)		Priors Dean; 51.061142°N 0.962760°W	Anglican	II*	The tiny, remote village lies in a steep valley with several farms, one of which is immediately next to the small Norman church. John Colson's restoration of 1857 changed its appearance—he added the chancel arch, bell-cot and lancet windows and refurnished the interior—but the structure and layout remain the same and when the church was built in 1120–30. Some 11th-century fabric may also survive. The chancel, which is at a slight angle to the aisleless nave, was rebuilt in the 13th century. There are many 17th- and 18th-century wall monuments.	
St Peter's Church (More images)		Ropley; 51.083401°N 1.079228°W	Anglican	II	Construction took place in stages over several centuries: the nave was built in the 11th century, transepts were added in the following century, the chancel and south chapel followed, and a large wooden belfry was built in the 14th century. The north transept was superseded by an aisle in 1896–97, when the chancel arch, porch and roof were also replaced and a gallery and other Georgian-era features were removed. This work was undertaken by Bournemouth architect C.T. Miles. The church (pictured in April 2013) was destroyed by fire on 19 June 2014; the nearby parish hall, built in 1939, is being used for services until repairs are completed.	
St John the Baptist's Church (More images)		Rowland's Castle; 50.885087°N 0.969643°W	Anglican	–	This stands at the southwestern edge of the village in an area called Redhill and was originally a chapel of ease to St Faith's Church at Havant. The village itself was historically in the parish of Chalton. Thomas Ellis Owen designed the original building in 1837–38, but it was extended just 15 years later by William and Edward Habershon: they added one bay to the chancel and aisles to both sides of the nave. Further alterations were made in 1905 and 1929.	
The Church on the Green (More images)		Rowland's Castle; 50.890436°N 0.962293°W	United Reformed Church	–	A building called Providence Chapel was registered in the village in May 1838, but the present church (originally known as Rowland's Castle Chapel) was registered in February 1884 for Congregationalists. It was designed by Portsmouth architect A. E. Cogswell in 1881. The chapel is a flint building with brick dressings and stonework forming the tracery of the windows. A small flèche sits on the roof. An extension was built in a similar style in 2009.	
St James's Church (More images)		Rowledge (Note: Most of the village is in Surrey, but the church and a few houses are on the Hampshire side of the county boundary.); 51.181295°N 0.827462°W	Anglican	–	The village was originally in the parish of Wrecclesham in Surrey. A separate parish was formed in 1869, and in 1869–70 the present Gothic Revival chapel was built. It was consecrated in January 1871. Extensions were built in 1985 and 1995. The stained glass in the east window dates from 1894.	
St Mary's Church (More images)		Selborne; 51.098520°N 0.942917°W	Anglican	I	The church here was founded in 1049, although the oldest fabric surviving in the present building dates from the 12th and 13th centuries. Edith of Wessex, who owned the Manor of Selborne at the time, gave the site. A large and wide church with work from many periods; the four-bay, twin-aisled nave and chancel are oldest parts. The tower was rebuilt in 1781, although the internal arch is 14th-century. Inside, the "outstandingly good" altar triptych depicting the Adoration of the Magi has been attributed to Jan Mostaert.	
St Peter and St Paul's Church (More images)		Shalden; 51.170296°N 1.010143°W	Anglican	II	The new church, replacing a much older predecessor (first documented in 1147) from which only the 15th-century font survives, was funded by an industrialist who lived at nearby Beech. It was designed by John Colson between 1863 and 1865 in the Early English Gothic Revival style and is of flint dressed with stone. The chancel is lower than the nave, all windows are lancets, and all except the east window contain Hardman & Co. stained glass.	
St Mary Magdalene's Church (More images)		Sheet; 51.015748°N 0.920837°W	Anglican	II	The church here was designed by Arthur Blomfield and was completed in 1869. Sheet was originally in the parish of Buriton, along with Petersfield. When the latter was separately parished in 1886, the church became part of that parish, and was only separated in 1989. It is an Early English Gothic Revival building of local sandstone dressed with Bath stone, dominated by a tall tower and steeple paid for by Bishop of Winchester Samuel Wilberforce. The aisleless nave and shorter chancel are separated by a chancel arch, and there is an entrance porch in the second of the four bays of the nave. Henry Holiday designed the stained glass in the east window; most of the other windows are by James Powell and Sons.	
Standford Gospel Hall (More images)		Standford; 51.103127°N 0.837972°W	Open Brethren	–	The predecessor to this building was a tin tabernacle, registered as The Iron Room in May 1906 and deregistered in January 1983, at which point the new Gospel hall replaced it.	
Brethren Meeting Room (More images)		Standford; 51.101644°N 0.837118°W	Plymouth Brethren Christian Church	–	This was built as a Bible Christian Methodist chapel in 1861, replacing a wooden chapel erected two years earlier at nearby Passfield (which had itself superseded a hired room used since 1830). The stone-built church had a capacity of 110. It closed in the early 2010s, was put up for sale in 2012 and was deregistered in July 2014, and has since been bought and re-registered by the Plymouth Brethren Christian Church as a local meeting room.	
All Saints Church (More images)		Steep; 51.022245°N 0.937894°W	Anglican	II*	The exterior of this church was greatly altered during restoration work in 1875–76, in particular by the removal of a small turret and its replacement by a much larger timber bell-cot hung with five mid-18th-century bells; but much original work from the 12th and 13th centuries survives inside. There is a nave and much shorter chancel, aisles with porches on both the south and north sides, and a 14th-century south doorway. Some medieval lancet windows survive. The four-bay south aisle and arcade have been dated to c. 1180. A 13th-century hexagonal font of Sussex sandstone also survives inside.	
Stroud Church (More images)		Stroud; 51.012353°N 0.965379°W	Anglican	–	Stroud, a village which grew rapidly in the late 19th century after a brickworks was established, was originally in the parish of East Meon but lay 3 miles (4.8 km) from the parish church of All Saints. It is also some distance from Steep, in whose parish it now lies. In 1897 this mission church, which has never had a dedication, was built. It is a brick and stone building with lancet windows.	
St Mary of the Assumption Church (More images)		Upper Froyle; 51.180116°N 0.920328°W	Anglican	I	The oldest part of the church is the "fine" late 13th-century chancel and chancel arch. Much of the structure is 14th-century, although some additions were made in the 18th and early 19th centuries, three rounds of Victorian restoration were carried out (mostly by George Frederick Bodley), and the north porch was altered in 1993. The walls of the chancel are of rendered malmstone; the rest of the church is of red and blue brick, including the buttressed west tower which was added in 1722. The tall three-bay nave has upper and lower groups of windows.	
St James's Church (More images)		Upper Wield; 51.144615°N 1.103010°W	Anglican	I	Minimal restoration was carried out between 1884 and 1885 to this mid-12th-century church, a simple nave-and-chancel building without aisles. There is no porch, but the south and north walls have round-arched doorways (the latter is blocked). The nave has two small, simple Perpendicular Gothic windows, one single and one paired. The Norman font was found in a garden near Winchester Cathedral in 1900 and brought to the church. Some 13th-century wall paintings were discovered in 1938, but only traces survive. The wooden bell-cot at the west end succeeded a tower which was removed in 1810.	
St Mary's Church (More images)		West Liss; 51.045204°N 0.895892°W	Anglican	II	Built as a chapel of ease to St Peter's, but now the parish church, this opened in 1892 and was designed by Arthur Blomfield in the Early English Gothic Revival style. He left the west end incomplete; between 1929 and 1932 Edward Maufe added a porch and a "commanding" tower. The whole building is of Bargate stone. Many of the internal fittings are early 20th-century, as is the stained glass (mostly by Charles Eamer Kempe). Eric Gill designed a sculpture of the Christ child and several memorial stones in the churchyard. The nave has north and south aisles and a clerestory.	
St Peter's Church (More images)		West Liss; 51.052328°N 0.902087°W	International Presbyterian Church	II*	This "engagingly rustic" ironstone and sandstone church was the original parish church of West Liss, dating from the 13th century (although its external appearance owes much to Ewan Christian's extensive restoration in 1864). More work was undertaken in 1903. It was declared redundant on 7 November 2008 and sold to its present congregation, who registered it in March 2010. The parish church of West Liss is now St Mary's.	
St Mary Magdalene's Church (More images)		West Tisted; 51.058572°N 1.073615°W	Anglican	II*	This small church stands next to farm and in the grounds of the demolished manor house. It consists of an undivided chancel and nave, the latter extended in 1848 (at the same time the chancel was rebuilt) but retaining much Norman fabric, an 18th-century porch and a weatherboarded bell-cot. The doorway in the north wall is very early 12th-century. A 13th-century font survives inside, and there are 17th- and 18th-century wall monuments to Benjamin Tichborne and members of his family.	
St Nicholas' Church (More images)		West Worldham; 51.127490°N 0.942237°W	Anglican	II	The church was derelict by the late 19th century, its roof having collapsed: it was rebuilt at the behest of Winchester College, holders of the advowson, by C.R. Pink in 1888. The aisleless nave and chancel are not structurally separated, and there are 13th-century doorways on both sides; that on the south side is set behind a 15th-century porch. The windows are lancets of various dates.	

== Former places of worship ==
Former places of worship
Name	Image	Location	Denomination/ Affiliation	Grade	Notes	Refs
Alton Evangelical Free Church (More images)		Alton; 51.150542°N 0.974019°W	Evangelical	–	This was the successor to the first Alton Evangelical Free Church on Amery Hill. It later changed its name to Harvest Church, and was superseded by the present church of that name in 2006.	
Brethren Meeting Room (More images)		Alton; 51.144274°N 0.983696°W	Plymouth Brethren	–	This building was registered for worship between June 1991 and August 2012.	
St Mary's Church (More images)		Alton; 51.144018°N 0.983772°W	Roman Catholic	–	Alton's first Roman Catholic church opened on Albert Street in 1913. It was deregistered in 1938 when a new church on Normandy Street superseded it, and is now a house.	
Alton United Reformed Church (More images)		Alton; 51.151278°N 0.971392°W	United Reformed Church	II	Chelmsford architect James Fenton designed this chapel for Alton's Congregational community in 1834–35, replacing a chapel of 1794. It was registered for marriages in June 1837, but fell out of use in 1996 and was deregistered in May of that year. It is a two-storey stucco-clad brick Gothic Revival building with a gabled three-bay façade from which a central gabled porch projects. The side elevations are of five bays separated by modest buttresses.	
Batts Corner Methodist Chapel (More images)		Batts Corner, Binsted; 51.162146°N 0.830681°W	Methodist	–	The brick-built chapel, now a house, was originally Bible Christian and passed to the United Methodists when that group was formed. It had a capacity of 105. It was not formally registered for worship until September 1953 or for marriages until January 1954.	
Buriton Primitive Methodist Church (More images)		Buriton; 50.975743°N 0.949668°W	Methodist	–	The chapel, a brick building with a capacity of 120, was built in 1848 and restored in 1881. It was registered for marriages between January 1896 and November 1971. After its closure it was converted into a commercial building.	
St Peter ad Vincula Church (More images)		Colemore; 51.071837°N 0.993698°W	Anglican	II*	Colemore was historically a small parish in remote, "well-wooded and undulating country". It has now been united with nearby Priors Dean, and the partly 11th- and 12th-century church was declared redundant in 1972 and vested in the care of the Churches Conservation Trust in September 1974. The original (11th-century) building was cruciform with an undivided nave and chancel; the south transept was demolished in 1670, but the north transept survives and has ancient features. It is linked to the nave by an off-centre chamfered arch, and a similar blocked arch to the destroyed south transept survives on the opposite wall. The timber bell-cot was added in 1975 after the church closed, replacing one of 1866.	
East Meon Primitive Methodist Chapel (More images)		East Meon; 50.994115°N 1.032531°W	Methodist	–	This 100-capacity brick chapel was built for Primitive Methodists and in 1940 was one of 12 chapels in the Petersfield and Haslemere Circuit, six of which had Primitive Methodist origins. It was founded in 1867 and completed in 1868, although it was not registered for marriages until June 1945. This was cancelled in July 1987 and the building was converted into a house.	
St Nicholas' Chapel (More images)		East Meon; 51.011386°N 1.064945°W	Pre-Reformation	II	The ruined chapel is in the grounds of Westbury House and was described in 1908 as being "annexed to the parish church of East Meon". It dates from the 13th century. There is no roof, and the walls have been partly destroyed, but the overall plan can still be seen: a single cell of 35 by 16 feet (10.7 m × 4.9 m) with a doorway in the south wall and several lancet windows. A font which survived inside until the 20th century has been moved to All Saints parish church.	
Church of the Assumption (More images)		East Meon; 50.994137°N 1.031020°W	Roman Catholic	–	Zoar Chapel was registered for Baptists in December 1901. This certification was cancelled in December 1972 when the building was re-registered as the Church of the Assumption for Roman Catholics, although it was in use by that denomination by 1960 when it was recorded as having one Sunday Mass and being a chapel of ease to Petersfield. It closed in the early 1990s and was converted into a house, and its registration was cancelled in June 1992.	
Finchdean Chapel		Finchdean; 50.910176°N 0.951746°W	United Reformed Church	II	The village is in the parish of Idsworth. This building was originally the stable block of Finchdean House; it dates from the 18th century and was converted into a Congregational chapel in 1830. It was formally registered for worship and marriages only in August 2014, but closed after its final service on 12 January 2019. It is a brick building with timber framing and a modern porch. The casement windows have cast iron bars.	
Old Church of St John (More images)		Greatham; 51.066941°N 0.897083°W	Anglican	II	The malmstone and ironstone chancel of Greatham's original parish church still stands and retains its roof, but the 13th-century nave is in ruins. The chancel arch, now blocked, is 18th-century, but some 11th-century work survives. Although long out of use, it was only formally declared redundant in February 1993.	
Holybourne Methodist Chapel (More images)		Holybourne; 51.163813°N 0.948049°W	Methodist	–	The brick-built former chapel is 19th century but was only registered for marriages in October 1976; this registration has never been cancelled, but the building is now in residential use. It was built for Wesleyan Methodists and had a capacity of 130. In 1940 it was one of nine Methodist churches in the Farnham and Alton Circuit.	
Horndean Independent Methodist Church (More images)		Horndean; 50.911036°N 1.002659°W	Methodist	–	This is now a house, but in August 1945 it was registered as an Independent Methodist chapel.	
St Nicholas' Church (More images)		Kingsley; 51.134681°N 0.888610°W	Anglican	II*	Kingsley's original parish church dates from the 14th century but was wholly rebuilt in 1778, mostly in brick but also using ironstone. It is a plain, single-room church with no division between the nave and chancel, a gabled porch, a wooden bell-cot with spire and a plastered interior with a gallery. All Saints Church in the centre of the village became the parish church, and St Nicholas' was declared redundant on 1 July 1975. The church and its churchyard have been taken over by the local parish council. The building is used as a mortuary chapel and is also licensed for "community and cultural events".	
Kingsley Congregational Chapel		Kingsley; 51.134935°N 0.874553°W	Congregational	–	This chapel, now a house, was registered between March 1882 and March 1971.	
Meeting Room (More images)		Liss; 51.043127°N 0.890176°W	Open Brethren	–	This tin tabernacle was briefly in religious use for a Brethren assembly: the planning application raised in 2011 for its conversion into a house stated that it dated from c. 1922, and A List of Some Assemblies of the British Isles (1933), a directory of Brethren assemblies, identifies a "Central Gospel Hall" in Liss. A Brethren meeting room was also mentioned in West Liss in the Victoria County History of 1908.	
Lovedean United Reformed Church (More images)		Lovedean; 50.910208°N 1.025164°W	United Reformed Church	–	A Presbyterian church was founded in Lovedean in 1966 by a minister for St Andrew's Presbyterian Church in Portsmouth. (Note: This was built in 1878–80 in the Landport area of the city. It was put up for sale in 1978 and was demolished in 1982.) The village hall was used—the right-hand (southeastern) section was partitioned off and used specifically for worship and church activities—and the first service was held on 16 October 1966. By 2016 the regular congregation was five or six people, and the last service was held 50 years later to the day. Latterly the church was linked with those at Havant and Emsworth.	
Medstead United Reformed Church (More images)		Medstead; 51.119015°N 1.060036°W	United Reformed Church	–	Congregational meetings took place in a house in Medstead from the 1890s, and in 1896 a chapel (a timber-framed tin tabernacle) was erected. The metal walls were later pebbledashed and rendered. It was registered for marriages in September 1897, and continued in regular use until the decision was taken to close c. 2019.	
Monkwood Mission Church		Monkwood; 51.073817°N 1.047633°W	Anglican	–	This wooden mission chapel opened in 1936 to serve an outlying hamlet in the large parish of Ropley. It had fallen out of use before 2014, when it was briefly reopened after the fire at St Peter's parish church. The building became structurally unsafe and was offered for sale for £150,000. Although the church is no longer in religious use, it is still part of the parish of Ropley.	
Oakhanger Congregational Chapel (More images)		Oakhanger; 51.122327°N 0.900500°W	Congregational	II	A plaque on the façade of this former chapel, now a house, states that it was built in 1820 and enlarged in 1852. Despite this, it was only registered for marriages in September 1960. It was founded by Elliah Butler of Alton. The single-storey building, with a low hipped roof of slate, is of stone dressed with brick. The gabled entrance porch is flanked by Gothic Revival-style two-light casement windows. The side elevations each have three similar windows.	
Petersfield Evangelical Church		Petersfield; 51.007788°N 0.930626°W	Evangelical	–	This building was registered for worship between September 1980 and February 2000.	
Petersfield Wesleyan Chapel (More images)		Petersfield; 51.003065°N 0.936020°W	Methodist	–	Petersfield's first Wesleyan chapel was in use from 1871 until the new chapel opened on Station Road in 1903, when its marriage registration (granted in October 1874) was cancelled in favour of its successor. The building, which is now the church hall of St Peter's parish church, was designed by William Willmer Pocock.	
Windsor Road Methodist Church (More images)		Petersfield; 51.006717°N 0.937545°W	Methodist	–	This 150-capacity chapel was built for Petersfield's Primitive Methodist worshippers (Note: Bullen et al (2010) incorrectly describe it as Wesleyan.) and was registered in July 1905 as Primitive Methodist Coronation Church. It became surplus to requirements after the Methodist Union of 1932 and was deregistered in July 1944. It became a Masonic hall; some stained glass with Masonic emblems has been inserted. The brick-built chapel is Gothic Revival in style.	
Barham Road Meeting Room (More images)		Petersfield; 51.005624°N 0.936043°W	Plymouth Brethren	–	Now a Pilates studio, this building was registered as a Brethren meeting room between March 1955 and February 2000.	
Holy Trinity Church (More images)		Privett; 51.038096°N 1.036201°W	Anglican	II*	The original church here (first documented in the 14th century, rebuilt in 1834, and linked to the church at West Meon) was replaced by a "fine flint structure" designed by Arthur Blomfield (Note: The Victoria County History of 1908 incorrectly attributes it to John Loughborough Pearson.) between 1876 and 1878. It cost £22,000 and was funded by William Nicholson of Basing Park, who also paid for the church at nearby Froxfield Green. The tower and spire, rising to 169 feet (52 m), are a landmark. The Early English Gothic Revival church is built of flint and various types of stone. The four-bay nave has aisles on both sides, and is separated from the "sumptuous" chancel by a chancel arch with shafts of Purbeck Marble. Sir Edward Bradford, 1st Baronet (d. 1911) is commemorated by an alabaster monument by Burlison and Grylls (although he is buried at St Nicholas' Church in Chawton). The same firm designed the stained glass in the east window. There is also a monument to Nicholson and his wife. The church was declared redundant on 1 December 1975 and was vested in the care of the Churches Conservation Trust in November 1980.	
Ramsdean Independent Chapel (More images)		Ramsdean; 50.995685°N 0.996232°W	Congregational	–	Ramsdean was in East Meon parish until 1894, and the distance from the parish church encouraged the growth of Nonconformity. This chapel was founded in 1830 and initially had 110 seats, but it was rebuilt and extended in 1887 (although the capacity remained the same). The Congregational chapel at Petersfield looked after Ramsdean. A chapel was later built in East Meon itself, and the congregation at Ramsdean declined. It was sold for residential conversion in 1967.	
Congregational Chapel		Selborne; 51.095080°N 0.939024°W	Congregational	–	This "typical small village chapel", built of white local stone in 1860 and apparently designed by John Boggar, was registered in May of that year. It closed in or before 1967, but its registration was not cancelled until January 1971. The building is now in residential use.	
Gospel Hall		Selborne; 51.096461°N 0.940627°W	Plymouth Brethren	–	An assembly of Brethren met in the farmhouse of Gerald Waterman for 38 years until this purpose-built meeting room opened on 21 September 1932 with assistance from the Gospel hall at Bedhampton. It was registered for worship in October 1932 and for marriages 12 months later, and remained in religious use until 1985. It has since been converted into a house.	
Stroud Primitive Methodist Chapel		Stroud; 51.008732°N 0.965226°W	Methodist	–	Primitive Methodist meetings in this village began in 1842 in a house. This chapel was built in 1867 (although a marriage registration was not granted until June 1893) and was in use until and 1946. After its closure it became an agricultural building for nearly 20 years, but was later converted into a house.	
Wield Chapel (More images)		Upper Wield; 51.144426°N 1.102511°W	Methodist	–	The chapel opened in either 1818 or 1848 (sources vary) for Primitive Methodists. In 1940 it was documented as being one of 11 such chapels in the Micheldever Circuit. In December 1982 it was reregistered for a denominationally independent congregation, and was still in use in 1991, but the small brick building is now a house.	
Kingdom Hall (More images)		West Liss; 51.045907°N 0.895744°W	Jehovah's Witnesses	–	This brick building was built as a 90-capacity Wesleyan Methodist chapel and was registered for their use in August 1893. In September 1970 it became a Kingdom Hall for Jehovah's Witnesses, and was registered for marriages in January 1975, but it has been now converted into a house.	

== Bibliography ==
- Bullen, Michael; Crook, John; Hubbuck, Rodney; Pevsner, Nikolaus (2010). Hampshire: Winchester and the North. The Buildings of England. London: Yale University Press. ISBN 978-0-300-12084-4.
- Chambers, Ralph (1952). The Strict Baptist Chapels of England: The Chapels of Surrey and Hampshire. Vol. 1. Thornton Heath: Ralph Chambers.
- Diocese of Portsmouth (December 1959). Portsmouth Diocesan Yearbook 1960 (12th ed.). Winchester: Donald S. Martell Ltd.
- Facey, Roy A., ed. (1981). International Church Index (Doctrinal). Index Publications. ISBN 0-907578-00-4.
- Giles, L.C. (1989). Liphook Calendar. Liphook: Bramshott and Liphook Preservation Society. ISBN 0-9511829-2-7.
- Hill, Roy (2002) [1990]. The Assemblies Address Book (PDF) (5th ed.). Bristol: Christian Year Publications. ISBN 1-872734-25-1. Archived from the original (PDF) on 19 September 2004.
- Kelly, Bernard W. (1907). Historical Notes on English Catholic Missions (PDF). London: Kegan Paul, Trench, Trübner & Co.
- Lloyd, David W. (1974). Buildings of Portsmouth and its Environs: A survey of the dockyard, defences, homes, churches, commercial, civic and public buildings. Portsmouth: City of Portsmouth. ISBN 0-901559-53-9.
- McAuley, Fr James (16 July 2016). The Diocese of Portsmouth Parish Boundaries 2016 (PDF) (Report). Portsmouth: Roman Catholic Diocese of Portsmouth. Archived from the original (PDF) on 5 August 2019.
- Methodist Church of Great Britain (1947). Methodist Church Buildings: Statistical Returns including Seating Accommodation as at July 1st, 1940 (PDF). Manchester: The Department for Chapel Affairs. (Available online in 14 parts; Guide to abbreviations on page 6)
- O'Brien, Charles; Bailey, Bruce; Pevsner, Nikolaus; Lloyd, David W. (2018). Hampshire: South. The Buildings of England. London: Yale University Press. ISBN 978-0-300-22503-7.
- s.n. (June 1933). A List of Some Assemblies of the British Isles. London: Pickering & Inglis.
- Stell, Christopher (1991). Inventory of Nonconformist Chapels and Meeting-Houses in South-West England. London: Royal Commission on the Historical Monuments of England. ISBN 0-117011-81-9.
- United Reformed Church (2018). Record of the General Assembly, Nottingham 2018 (PDF). London: The United Reformed Church. ISBN 978-0-85346-333-7. Archived (PDF) from the original on 29 October 2020.
- United Reformed Church (2020). Record of Assembly 2020 (PDF). London: The United Reformed Church. ISBN 978-0-85346-346-7. Archived (PDF) from the original on 21 January 2021.
