= Darvill =

Darvill is a surname. Notable people with the surname include:

- Arthur Darvill (born 1982), British actor and musician
- Benjamin Darvill (born 1967), a.k.a. Son of Dave, Canadian musician and singer–songwriter
- George Darvill (1898–1950), English World War I flying ace
- Keith Darvill (born 1948), British politician
- Michelle Darvill (born 1965), rower for Canada and Germany
- Peter Darvill-Evans (born 1954), English writer and editor
- Timothy Darvill, English archaeologist

== See also ==
- Darville
