= George Darvill =

English World War I flying ace

George William Francis Darvill
- Born: 26 October 1898; East Meon, Petersfield, Hampshire, England
- Died: September 1950 (aged 51); Christchurch, Hampshire, England
- Military career
- Allegiance: United Kingdom
- Branch: British Army; Royal Air Force
- Rank: Captain
- Units: No. 9 Squadron RFC; No. 18 Squadron RAF
- Conflicts: World War I World War II
- Awards: Military Cross; Distinguished Flying Cross

Captain George William Francis Darvill MC, DFC (26 October 1898 – September 1950) was an English World War I flying ace credited with nine aerial victories.

== Early life ==
Darvill was born in East Meon, Petersfield, Hampshire, England, the son of Minnie M. and George Darvill. He worked as a farmer until he joined the Royal Flying Corps during World War I.

== World War I ==
Darvill was commissioned as a probationary second lieutenant on 20 April 1917. He was awarded Royal Aero Club Aviators Certificate No. 4973 at RAF Hendon on 13 July 1917. His first, brief, assignment was a posting to No. 9 Squadron from October to December 1917; the squadron then moved forward to action in France. On 13 January 1918, he transferred to No. 18 Squadron to fly Airco DH.4 light bombers. Beginning on 10 March 1918, he began a string of nine aerial victories that did not end until 4 September 1918.

His succession of victories was rewarded by a Military Cross, which was gazetted on 3 June 1918. He was also promoted to temporary captain and appointed as a flight commander on 18 August 1918. August 1918 also saw his award of a Distinguished Flying Cross, although it was not gazetted until 2 November 1918. His citation read:

"When returning from a bombing raid this officer, singlehanded, engaged three Fokkers. Despite the fact that his observer's gun jambed, he drove down one out of control, which was seen to crash. He has carried out forty-four successful bombing raids, several of which he has led. In addition, he has rendered valuable service on photographic and other reconnaissance duty. A keen and zealous officer, who sets a fine example of devotion to duty to younger pilots."

=== List of aerial victories ===
George Darvill
No.	Date/time	Aircraft	Foe	Result	Location	Notes
1	10 March 1918 @ 1215 hours	Airco DH.4 (Serial No. B9435)	Albatros D.V	Driven down out of control	Allenes	Darvil's observer: Sgt. A. Pollard
2	19 May 1918 @ 1200 hours	Airco DH.4	Albatros D.V	Driven down out of control	Douai	Observer: Lt. E. Collins; Victory shared with Albert Gregory Waller & 3 others
3	21 May 1918 @ 1045 hours	Airco DH.4 (s/n A8034)	Albatros D.V	Destroyed	Douai	Observer: AM2 L. Vredenberg
4	8 July 1918 @ 0830 hours	Airco DH.4 (s/n A7815)	Fokker D.VII	Destroyed	Henin-Liétard	Observer: Lt. William Miller
5	28 July 1918 @ 0735 hours	Airco DH.4 (s/n A7815)	Fokker D.VII	Driven down out of control	Vitry	Observer: Lt. William Miller
6	9 August 1918 @ 1050 hours	Airco DH.4	Fokker D.VII	Driven down out of control	West of Douai	Observer: Lt. J. Fenwick; Shared with John Gillanders, Herbert Gould & 10 others
7	12 August 1918 @ 1100 hours	Airco DH.4 (s/n F5857)	Fokker D.VII	Driven down out of control	West of Somain	Observer: Lt. J. Fenwick
8	4 September 1918 @ 0750 hours	Airco DH.4 (s/n A7815)	Fokker D.VII	Set on fire; destroyed	Cantin	Observer: Lt. William Miller
9	4 September 1918 @ 0755 hours	Airco DH.4 (s/n A7815)	Fokker D.VII	Set on fire; destroyed	Aubigny-au-Bac	Observer: Lt. William Miller

== Post World War I ==
Darvill was discharged from the Royal Air Force on 12 September 1919.

On 16 January 1926, Darvill was married to Violet Ruth Collins at Ashtead; the report of the nuptials in Flight indicate that Darvill was still involved in the world of aviation.

He would leave his home in Ramsdean, Petersfield to enter the Royal Air Force Volunteer Reserve in September 1939. On 14 March 1941, he was commissioned as a probationary pilot officer with seniority from 14 February 1941. On 14 February 1942, he was confirmed in rank as a flight lieutenant.

George William Francis Darvill died in September 1950 in Christchurch, Hampshire, England.
