= Darville =

Darville is a surname. Notable people with this surname include:

== People ==
- Eka Darville (born 1989), Australian actor
- Helen Darville (born 1972), Australian writer and lawyer
- Jeanne Darville (1923–1995), Danish actress
- Liam Darville (born 1990), English footballer
- Michael Darville, Bahamian politician

== See also ==
- Darvill
