= Westbury House =

Coordinates: 51.0106°N 1.0655°W

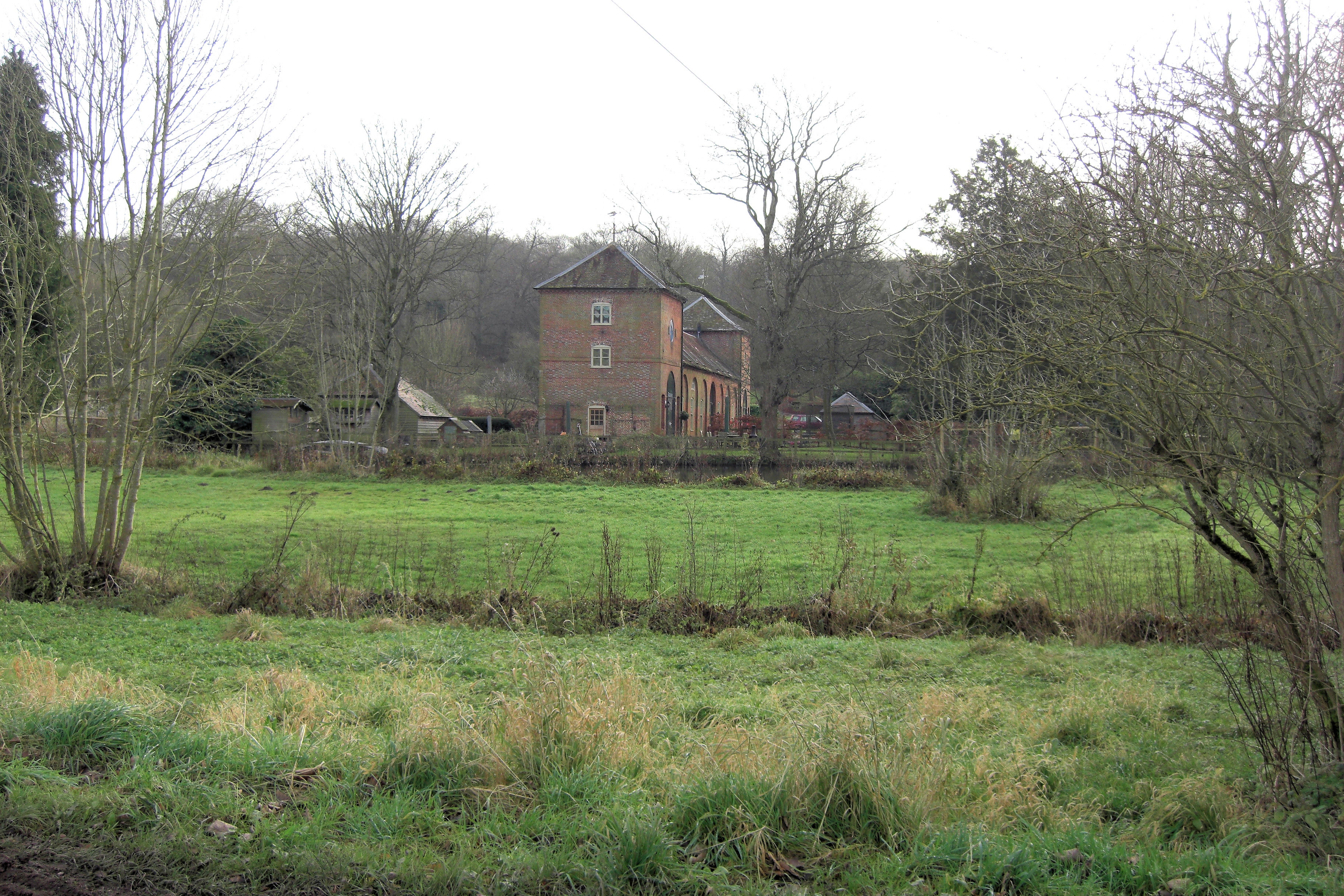
Westbury House stables

Westbury House is a country house south of West Meon Road between East Meon and West Meon in Hampshire, England.

The house was built in the Palladian style but rebuilt in brick after a fire in 1904. It subsequently became a boys' preparatory school, whose headmaster until the late 1970s was Errol Adrian 'Sherard' Manners, brother of John Manners. It later became a care home until it closed in the 2016 after being rated inadequate by inspectors.

It was once occupied by the Sartoris family and Mary Sartoris was painted by Frederick Leighton.

The house is not a listed building, although the ice houses and stables nearby are listed, presumably having escaped destruction in the fire.
