= English Presbyterianism =

Protestant tradition in England

Presbyterianism in England is practised by followers of the Reformed tradition within Protestantism who practise the Presbyterian form of church government. Dating in England as a movement from 1588, it is distinct from Continental and Scottish forms of Presbyterianism. The Unitarian historian Alexander Gordon (1841–1931) stated that, whereas in Scotland, church government is based on a meeting of delegates, in England the individual congregation is the primary body of government. This was the practice in Gordon's day, however, most of the sixteenth and seventeenth century English theoreticians of Presbyterianism, such as Thomas Cartwright, John Paget, the Westminster Assembly of Divines and the London Provincial Assembly, envisaged a Presbyterian system composed of congregations, classes and synods. Historically Presbyterians in England were subsumed into the United Reformed Church in 1972. In more recent years the Evangelical Presbyterian Church in England and Wales and the International Presbyterian Church have seen modest growth in England.

== Attempts to convert the Church of England ==
=== 16th and early 17th centuries ===
Though the word Presbyterian dates to 1607, English Presbyterianism had its beginnings in 1558, the year of Elizabeth I's accession, when Protestant exiles, who had fled Mary I's revived heresy laws and the associated executions, began to return to England. Some of these Elizabethan puritans began to campaign for ecclesiastical reform from within the established (i.e. state-supported) Church of England. They sought to recreate the pattern of church life recorded in Scripture, without vestments and prelates, when church government was in the hands of presbyters. There were unsuccessful attempts to bring some of the informal networks of Puritan clergy and laity into a more Presbyterian forms by clerics such as John Field.

=== Civil War and Interregnum ===
English Presbyterianism itself dates to the tumultuous year 1641, which saw the execution of the Earl of Stafford, the Imprisonment of the Twelve Bishops, the publication of the Grand Remonstrance, and most importantly the beginning of a great debate within and without Parliament on the subject of church government. On 11 December 1640, 15,000 Londoners presented the Root and Branch petition to Parliament, which led to the Westminster Assembly of Divines. The Assembly reported in July 1645. Later that year, Parliament enacted for the establishment in every parish of a "congregational assembly", consisting of ruling elders elected by the minister and members of the congregation, and meeting weekly. In practice, few parish assemblies became established. The execution of Charles I in 1649 horrified the Presbyterians and led to a serious rupture between them and the Independents. English Presbyterians came to be representative of those Puritans who still cherished further reformation in church, but were unwavering in their fundamental loyalty to the Crown.

== Restoration and Post-Restoration ==
Following the Restoration of the monarchy under King Charles II, and of the episcopal (bishop-led) system within the Church of England, Anglican ministers who favoured a Presbyterian polity found themselves in a dilemma. The Act of Uniformity 1662 required that they accept the Book of Common Prayer in its entirety, as well as the requirement of episcopal ordination. Ministers who did not accept, some 2,000 of them, were removed from their posts (and, usually, their homes as well) on St Bartholomew's Day, in what became known as the Great Ejection. This was followed by more than a century of persecution, including further acts of Parliament such as the Marriage Act 1753.

The Church of England had difficulty filling the vacancies caused by the ejection of so many ministers. In some cases, ministers continued to baptise, marry, and preach in the parish church, quite illegally. In general, the ejected ministers continued to preach to dispersed congregations, making use of now unused chapels of ease (most of which had been built with privately donated funds), and from their own homes. However, by the end of the seventeenth century, the Church of England had reclaimed these chapels of ease, and Dissenting congregations began to build their own chapels.

Aside from Quaker meetings, the English Dissenters styled themselves as either 'Independent' or 'Presbyterian'. The 'Independents', who might have a Calvinistic or a Baptist creed, regarded themselves as exclusive, and distinct from the parish church. The Presbyterians, on the other hand, though each congregation was as independent and autonomous as any Independent chapel, used the name 'Presbyterian' because they regarded the doors of their chapels as open to all members of the parish; or, at least, all members of the parish who were of good character. In effect, they regarded each chapel as just another parish church. It was this attitude which, at first, caused particular animosity towards Presbyterians from some Anglicans, who regarded them as schismatics, actively seeking to divide the Church in England. Outwardly, though, there was initially little difference between 'Independents' and 'Presbyterians', except that they received financial assistance from the Independent and the Presbyterian Fund boards, respectively.

The exclusivity of Independent congregations tended to perpetuate a conservatism in Christian doctrine, which kept the congregations orthodox and Calvinistic. The more open attitude of Presbyterian congregations led them to appoint ministers with a more liberal viewpoint, which, amongst other factors such as their ministers being trained in the Dissenting Academies, led to a growing heterodoxy into Arminianism, Arianism, and eventually Christian Unitarianism.

== Presbyterian Groups ==
=== Presbyterian Church of England ===
The Presbyterian Church of England was founded in 1876 by merging of the English congregations of the chiefly Scottish United Presbyterian Church with various other Presbyterian congregations in England.

=== United Reformed Church ===
In 1972, virtually all congregations of the Presbyterian Church of England combined with the majority of churches in the Congregational Church in England and Wales to form the United Reformed Church in England. Across the denomination (covering England, Wales and Scotland) It has 1,198 congregations, with a membership of about 42,000 people.

=== International Presbyterian Church ===
In 1969 the International Presbyterian Church was founded in England with its first congregation in Ealing. In October 2025, it had 22 congregations in England as part of the British Presbytery. In addition it has six Korean-speaking congregations listed on their website as part of the Korean Presbytery. This compares to the 2019 figures of nine congregations within the British Presbytery and seven within the Korean presbytery.

=== Evangelical Presbyterian Church in England and Wales ===
In 1996 the Evangelical Presbyterian Church in England and Wales was established as a presbytery. In 2025 it had 18 congregations (11 in England, 3 in Wales, 1 in Sweden, 1 in Switzerland, and 2 in Germany. As of 2016 it had 17 congregations (12 in England, 3 in Wales, 1 in Sweden, and 1 in Germany.

== See also ==
- Nonconformism
- Congregational polity
- Congregationalism
- Congregationalism in the United States
