= Ramsdean =

Village in Hampshire, England

Coordinates: 50.99564°N 0.99592°W

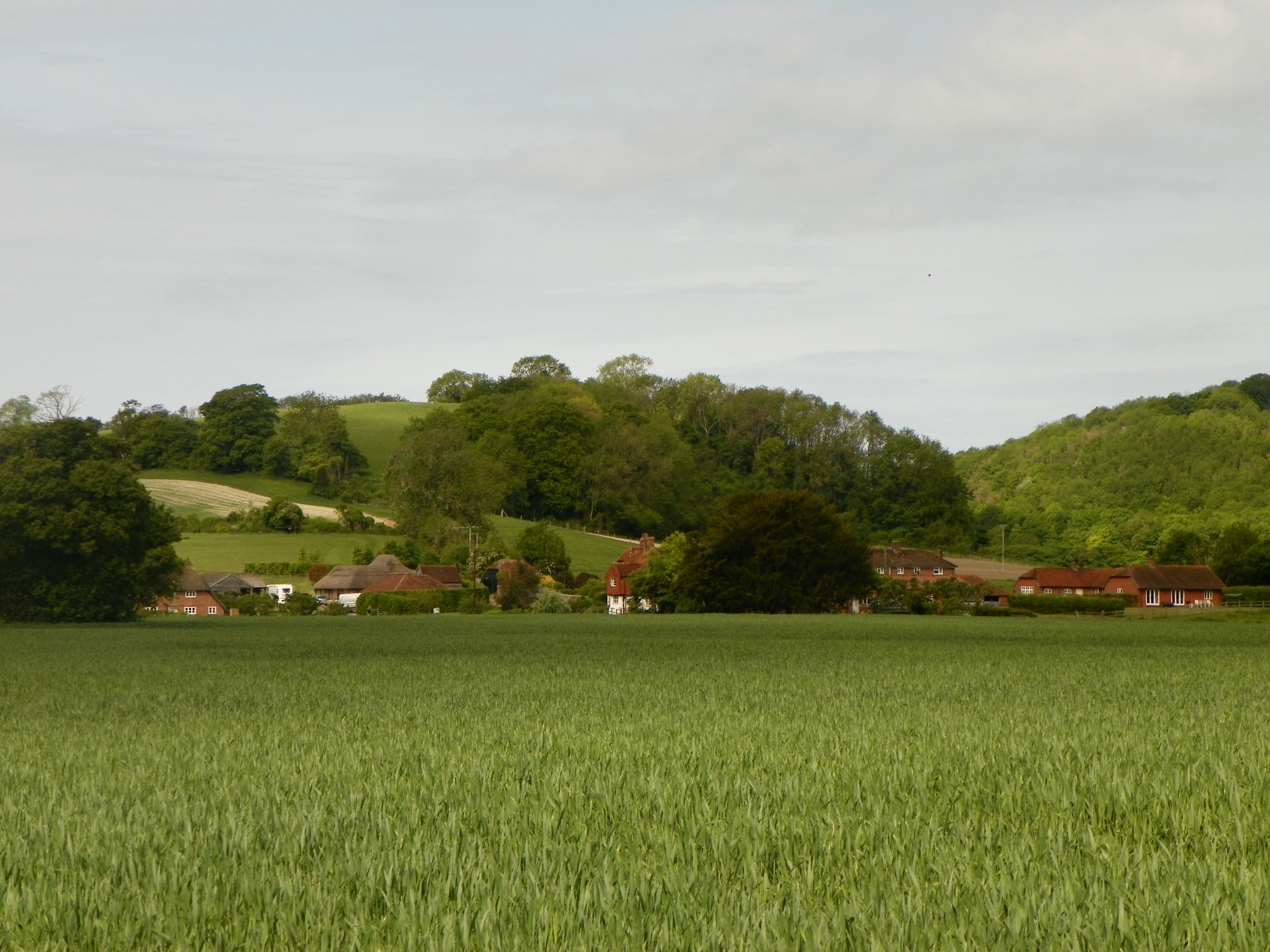
- Looking towards Ramsdean

- Location within Hampshire
- OS grid reference: SU705222
- Civil parish: Langrish
- District: East Hampshire
- Shire county: Hampshire
- Region: South East
- Country: England
- Sovereign state: United Kingdom
- Post town: Petersfield
- Postcode district: GU32
- Police: Hampshire and Isle of Wight
- Fire: Hampshire and Isle of Wight
- Ambulance: South Central

Ramsdean is a village in the East Hampshire district of Hampshire, England. It is 2.7 miles (4.3 km) west of Petersfield.

The nearest railway station is Petersfield, 2.7 miles (4.3 km) east of the village.

== Notable people ==
Actor Jude Law currently resides in Ramsdean with his children attending the nearby Bedales School in Petersfield.
