= West Liss =

Neighbourhood of Liss, Hampshire, England

Coordinates: 51.040000°N 0.895000°W

- Location within Hampshire
- OS grid reference: SU7756827319
- Civil parish: Liss
- District: East Hampshire
- Shire county: Hampshire
- Region: South East
- Country: England
- Sovereign state: United Kingdom
- Post town: LISS
- Postcode district: GU33
- Dialling code: 01730
- Police: Hampshire and Isle of Wight
- Fire: Hampshire and Isle of Wight
- Ambulance: South Central
- UK Parliament: East Hampshire

West Liss is the oldest part of the modern village of Liss, in Hampshire, England. It has one pub remaining, The Spread Eagle - The Blue Bell was recently torn down and new housing has been built in its place.

The Liss Cricket Club is also based in West Liss. It has a picturesque ground with a quirky fixture of a short boundary due to a large over-hanging oak tree. West Liss is home to the original Grade II listed Parish Church of Liss, St Peter. It was closed in 2008 and sold to the International Presbyterian Church who use the building presently. St Mary's Church stands in the main town of Liss and was designed by Sir Arthur Blomfield and consecrated 1892. The composer Michael Hurd lived at 4, Church Street from 1961 until his death in 2006.
