= All Saints Church, East Meon =

Coordinates: 50.9959°N 1.0315°W

All Saints' Church, East Meon
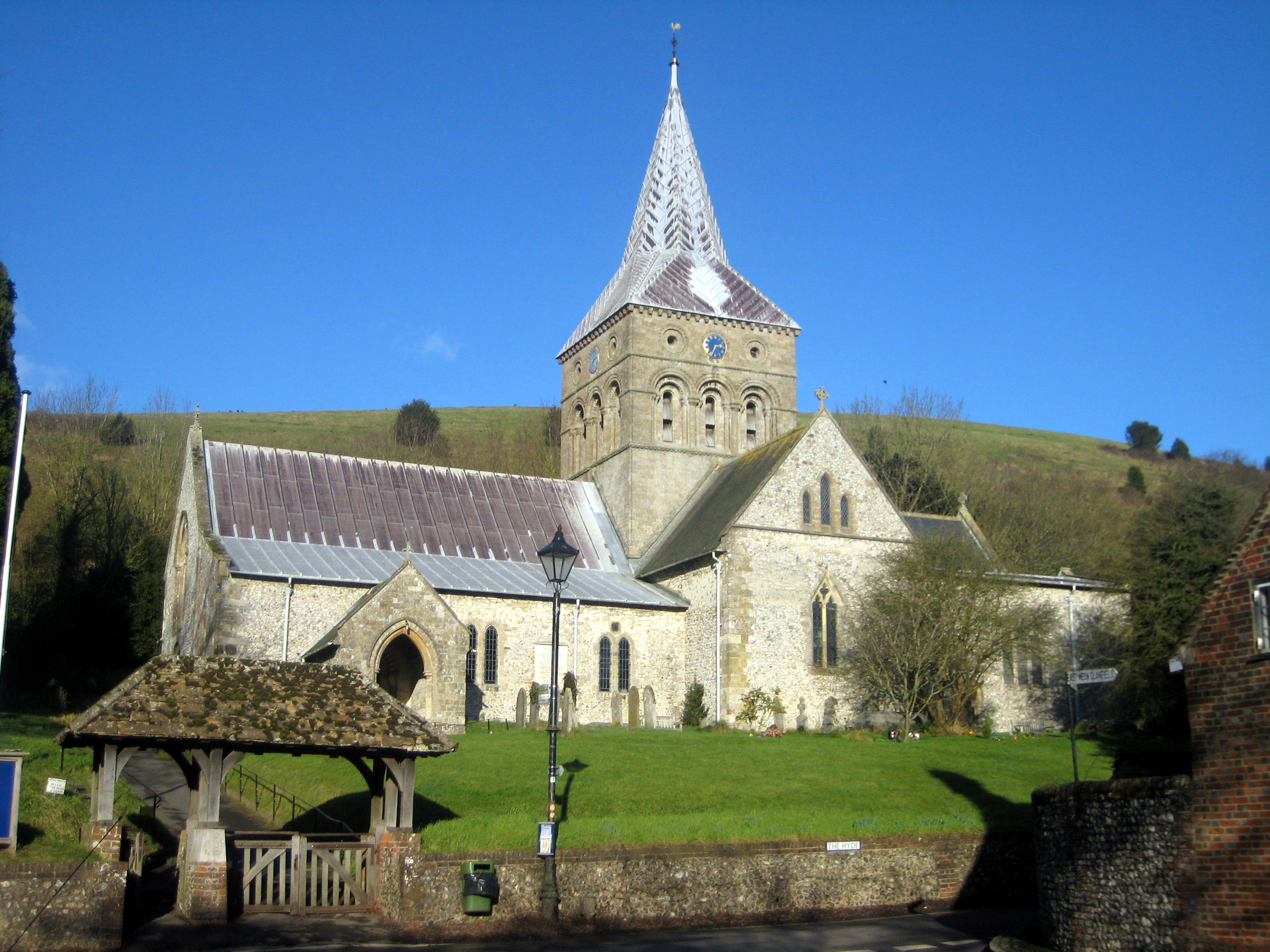
- All Saints' Church, East Meon

- Location within Hampshire
- OS grid reference: SU 68062 22283
- Location: East Meon, Hampshire
- Country: England
- Denomination: Anglican
- Website: http://www3.hants.gov.uk/parish/east-meon

History
- Status: Parish church
- Founded: c. 1080 or c. 1130–40
- Dedication: All Saints

Architecture
- Functional status: Active
- Heritage designation: Listed building – Grade I
- Style: Norman, Early English

Specifications
- Materials: Stone

Administration
- Province: Canterbury
- Diocese: Portsmouth

Clergy
- Bishop: Bishop of Portsmouth
- Vicar: Reverend Tony Forrest

All Saints' Church is an Anglican parish church in the village of East Meon, Hampshire, England. It is a Grade I listed building and the oldest building in the village, lying so tight to a hill to the north of the village – part of the South Downs – that there was no room for a north aisle to be built. Most of the church dates from the Norman period, with the south chapel and south aisle being added in the 13th century.

According to Nikolaus Pevsner it is "one of the most thrilling village churches in Hampshire", to John Betjeman it is "a striking, boldly massed church set above the village against a green down", while Simon Jenkins states that of the Saxon foundations in the Meon valley, "few are as satisfying as East Meon".

== History ==
=== Norman ===
There is uncertainty as to when building work on the church commenced: one source gives a date between 1130 and 1140, while the parish history gives 1080, and the instigator as probably Bishop Walkelin, who rebuilt Winchester Cathedral. The church was probably built on a site where there was a pre-existing Anglo-Saxon structure, the church that we see today being "essentially that of the conquerors". The original church was in the shape of a cross, 110 feet long and 62 feet wide, and is easily identified by the Romanesque arches. The tower is of c. 1150, although the lead-covered broach spire – which can be seen from the South Downs Way – is later, probably 1230, and its decoration – scallops and zigzag – is similar to that found on Winchester Cathedral.

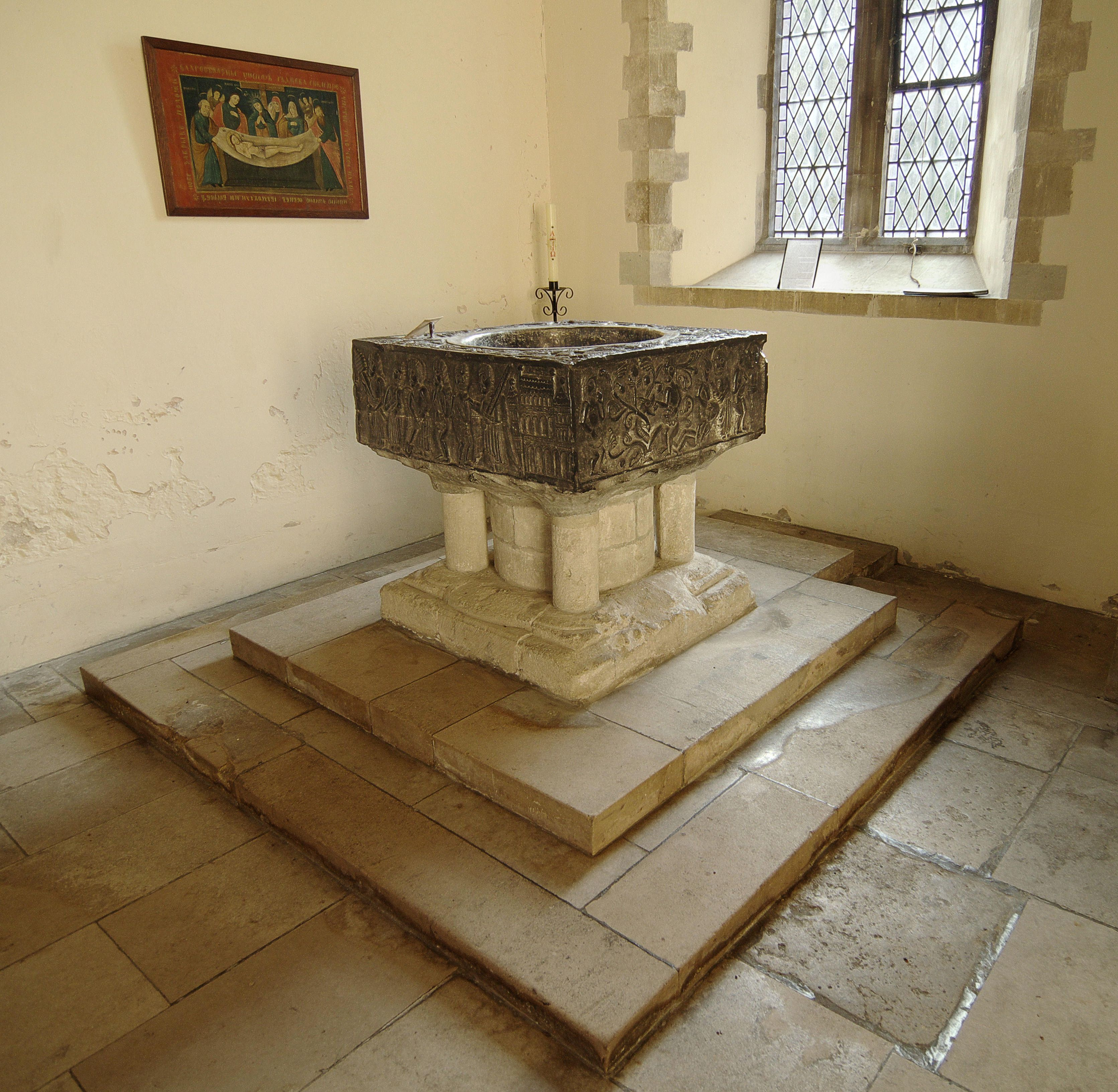
The Tournai font, c. 1130–40

The massive and ornate Tournai font of c. 1130–40, like three others in Hampshire (Winchester Cathedral, St Michael's, Southampton, and St Mary's Church, Bourne) and three elsewhere in England, is made of Tournai marble (not strictly a marble but a dark limestone). It was probably a gift to the church from Henry of Blois, Bishop of Winchester. The Romanesque friezes on its sides, carved by Flemish masters, depict the creation of Adam and Eve and the Temptation (N face); the Expulsion from the Garden of Eden and Adam being shown how to dig (E); and various animals, birds and dragons on the S and W faces.

=== 13th–18th century ===
The south (Lady) chapel and south aisle in the Early English style date from the early 13th century, with the south aisle's windows being made later on; the east window of the Lady Chapel is by Sir Ninian Comper from his 20th-century restoration, as is the chapel's wood and alabaster reredos. There appears to have been rebuilding of the chancel between 1470 and 1498, the clue being the arms of Prior Hinton and the Priory and Convent of St Swithun on the chancel's east wall. The windows of the south chapel also date from the late 15th century.

The north transept was used as a Sunday school and a school for 160 children during the 18th and first part of the 19th century, before the school moved to its own premises in 1845.

=== 19th–20th century ===
Ewan Christian oversaw the restoration of the interior in 1869–70, which saw the removal of the 18th-century high pews and galleries, and there was further rebuilding between 1906 and 1922 by Sir Ninian Comper, including the perpendicular east window in the chancel, which is a copy of the original, the altar and the screen that divides the chancel and Lady's Chapel. The pulpit, made in 1706, was brought from the Church of Holy Trinity, Minories, London in 1906; in the same year new woodwork – quire seats, and screens in the arcade separating the chancel from the south chapel − was installed. The organ dates from 1983 and was built by Peter Wells.

The church hall was built in 2000. A Millennium embroidery that was made by 40 hands was installed in the church in 2008.
