= Langrish =

Village and parish in Hampshire, England

Coordinates: 51.00882°N 0.99706°W

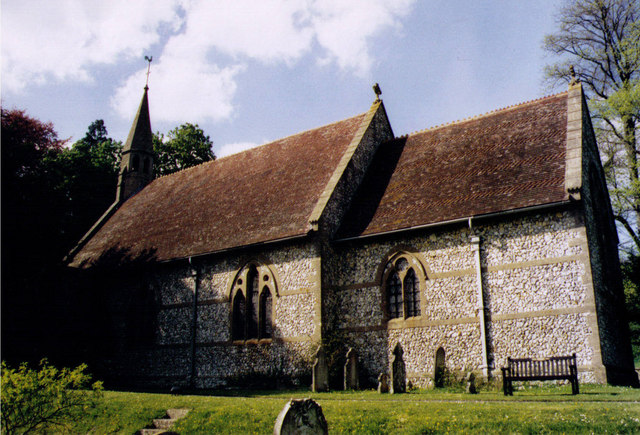
- St John the Evangelist, Langrish

- Location within Hampshire
- Population: 297
- OS grid reference: SU704237
- Civil parish: Langrish
- District: East Hampshire
- Shire county: Hampshire
- Region: South East
- Country: England
- Sovereign state: United Kingdom
- Post town: Petersfield
- Postcode district: GU32
- Police: Hampshire and Isle of Wight
- Fire: Hampshire and Isle of Wight
- Ambulance: South Central

Langrish is a village and civil parish in the East Hampshire district of Hampshire, England. It is next to the civil parish of Stroud and is 2.7 miles (4.3 km) west of Petersfield, on the A272 road.

== Rail connections ==
The nearest main railway station is Petersfield, 2.3 miles (3.7 km) east of the village.

== Village church ==
The church of St John the Evangelist is on the NW side of the village on the west side of the A272 road.

== Langrish House ==
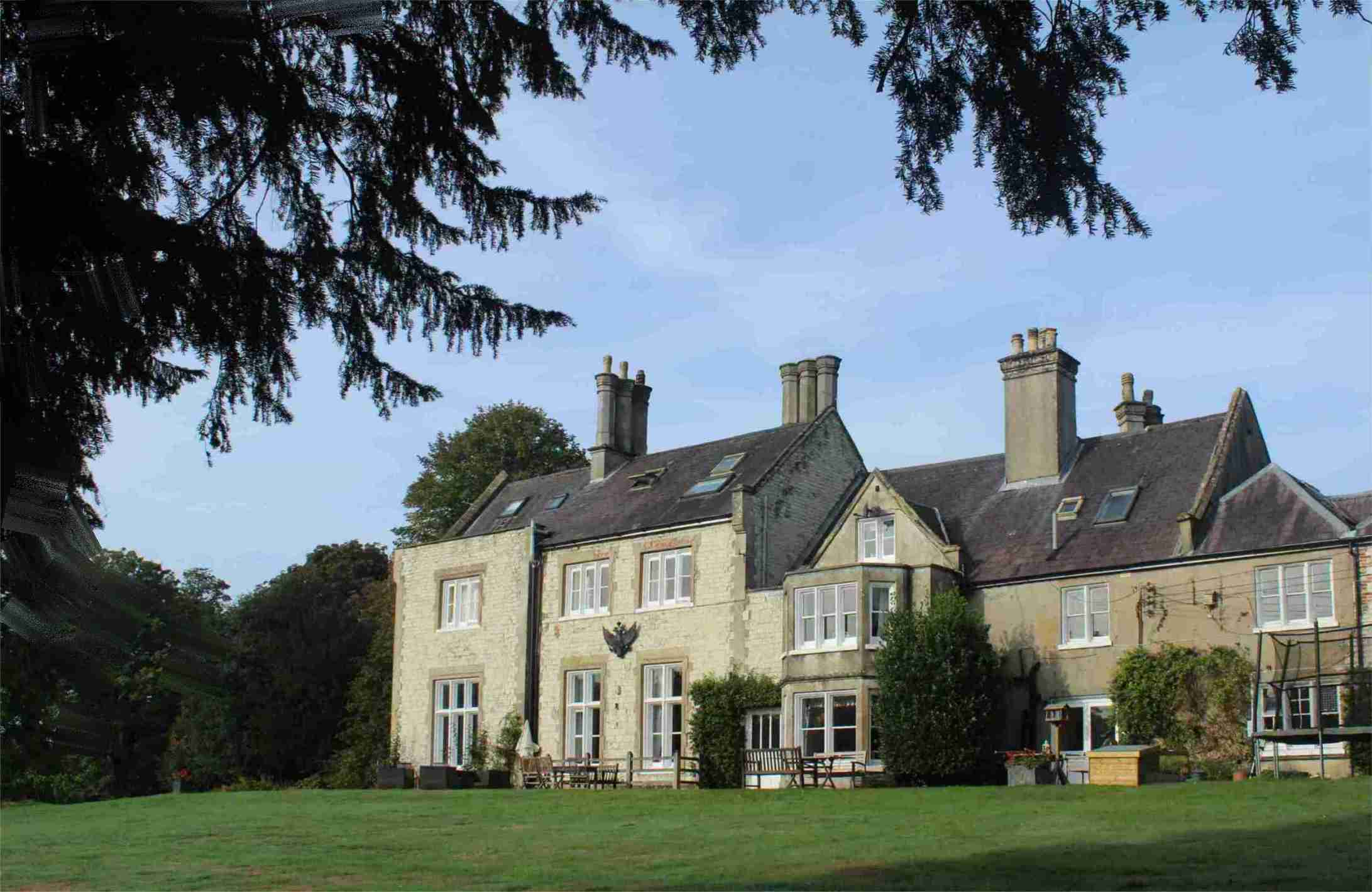

On the south side of the village east of a minor road to East Meon is Langrish House, parts of which date to the early 1600s. It is said that Royalist prisoners were kept these there after the nearby Battle of Cheriton that was won by Parliamentarian General Sir William Waller. Since the mid 19th Century, Langrish House has been owned by the Ponsonby-Talbot family and today it also operates as a country house hotel. To the north of the House is a small industrial facility, originally part of the Langrish House estate, where parts were made for nose-cone of the supersonic airliner Concorde.

== Sport ==
Langrish has been host to the British Sidecarcross Grand Prix a number times and hosted it again in 2012, on 26 and 27 August.
