= White Eagle Lodge =

Spiritual organisation founded by Grace and Ivan Cooke in 1936

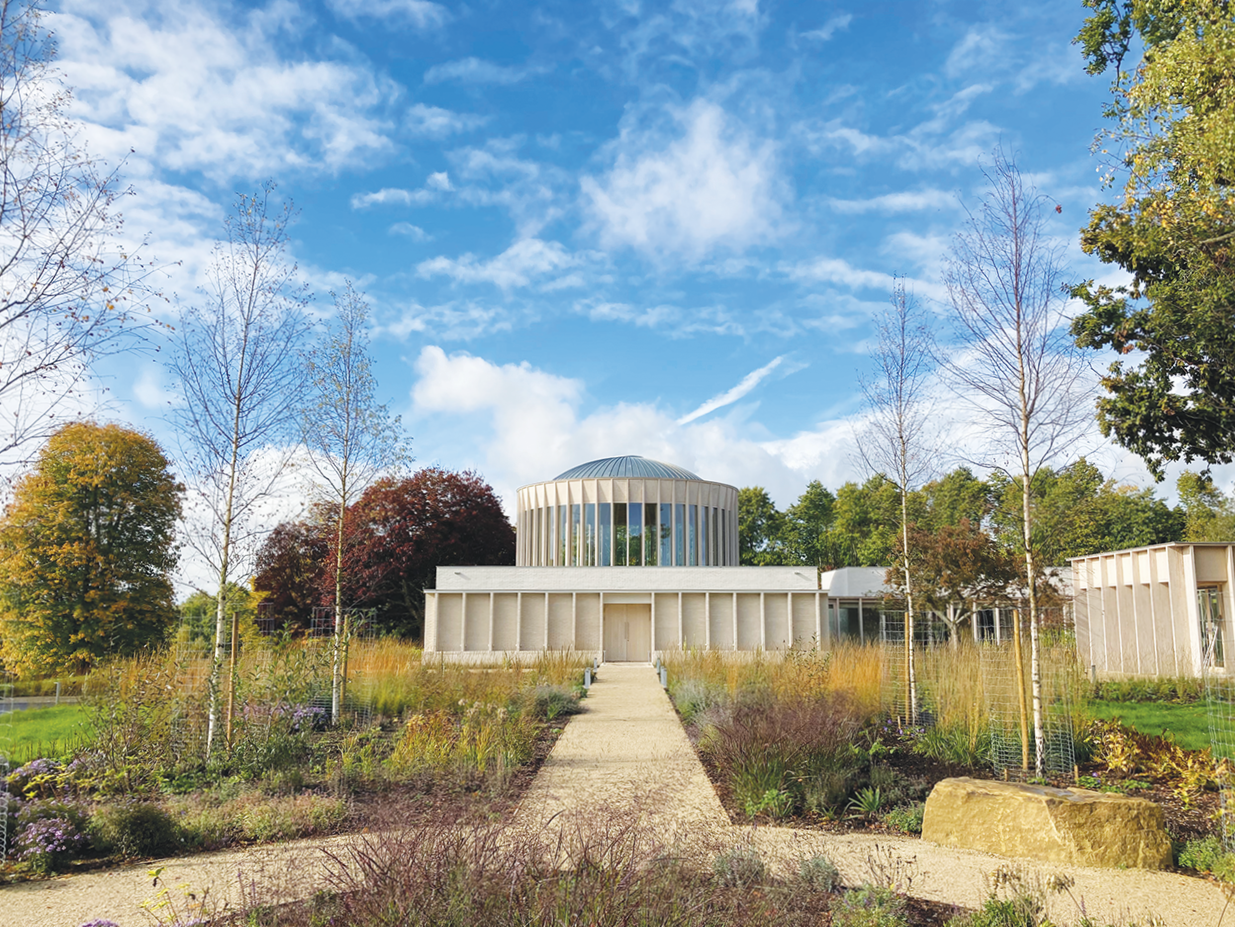
Temple of Light at White Eagle Lodge Liss, Hampshire

The White Eagle Lodge is a spiritual organisation first founded in England, founded by Grace and Ivan Cooke in 1936. Grace was a medium who claimed to have received the teachings from a spirit in the higher realms named White Eagle. The White Eagle Publishing Trust distributes the teachings of White Eagle worldwide in many languages. The Mother Lodge is in England with two continental centers in America and Australia.

Its work is to help humanity develop its true spiritual nature, and uses the symbol of the six pointed Christ Star to radiate peace and healing to those in need. Healing, both absent and contact, meditation, yoga and astrology are taught and practised. The White Eagle Lodge is classified by scholars as a new religious movement.

== History ==
The White Eagle Lodge was founded in 1936 by the medium Grace Cooke (1892–1979) and her husband Ivan Cooke. Grace had previously worked as a medium for the Spiritualist Church of England and allegedly received a message in 1930 to educate men and women about the coming of the golden age through the light of Christ. The symbol of the lodge is a six-pointed star which represents perfect balance. Grace shared the teachings allegedly channelled from her Native American spirit guide, "White Eagle".

In the 1950s, the White Eagle Lodge spread to the United States and a Center was established in Texas in 1987. Members of White Eagle Lodge believe that God is the Father and Mother, they also believe in a cosmic Christ and in five cosmic laws, including karma and reincarnation. White Eagle Lodge teaches compassion for all, including animals and a vegetarian diet is encouraged.

== Astrology school ==
Teaching astrology has long been an important aspect of the Lodge work. Joan Hodgson (née Cooke) developed a beginners’ correspondence course in 1941, and wrote a series of articles for the early Lodge journal Angelus. These were published as Wisdom in the Stars. Since then she wrote several other books over several decades and was on the UK Faculty of Astrological Studies at its foundation.

In 1976 the Lodge expanded Joan's work into a school and she was active until her death in 1995. The school now has Simon Bentley as its principal, he had worked closely with her for over a decade. The Lodge holds an annual conference, publishes a journal Altair, conducts other day events, still runs correspondence courses, and does horoscope readings for clients.

== Healing ==
Absent healing is healing by prayer, directed at absent patients. Lone absent healers work from home on their own, and tuning into the Angels of Healing they call on the patients' names and pray for them. Following a set form of service, they envisage colours being gently applied to psychic centres or "chakras" by healing angels. Thousands of people and animals are on such lists worldwide at any given time. A description of the method used by the Lodge in its healing is found in A Healers Journey Into Light by Lorna Todd. Members can also work in absent healing groups led by an experienced Healer. There are specific groups working to heal animals.

== Work in America ==
Jean Le Fevre, who had been active in the Crowborough Daughter Lodge (U.K.) moved to the United States and was a key figure in enabling the construction of the Temple of the Golden Rose in Montgomery, Texas, where the organisation is registered as the "Church of the White Eagle Lodge." The Lodge work there is open to liaison with Native spiritual teachings.
