= Stroud, Hampshire =

Village and parish in Hampshire, England

Coordinates: 51.00775°N 0.97178°W

Stroud
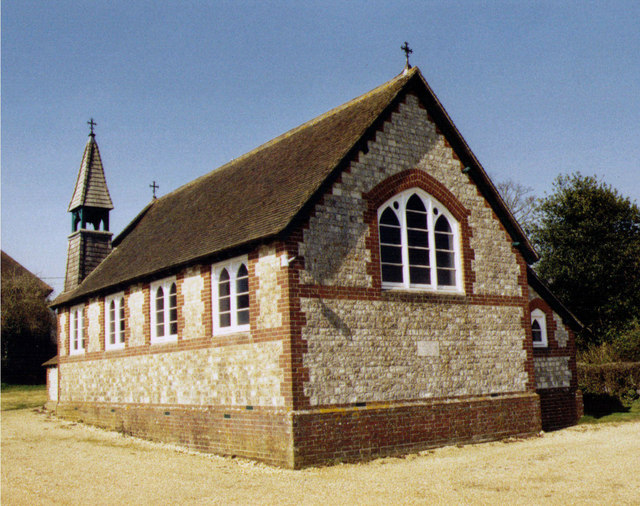
- Stroud Mission Church

- Location within Hampshire
- Population: 360 (2011 Census)
- OS grid reference: SU722236
- Civil parish: Stroud
- District: East Hampshire
- Shire county: Hampshire
- Region: South East
- Country: England
- Sovereign state: United Kingdom
- Post town: Petersfield
- Postcode district: GU32
- Police: Hampshire and Isle of Wight
- Fire: Hampshire and Isle of Wight
- Ambulance: South Central
- UK Parliament: East Hampshire

Stroud (/ˈstruːd/) is a village and civil parish in the East Hampshire district of Hampshire, England. It is 1.4 miles (2.3 km) west of Petersfield, on the A272 road.

The nearest railway station is Petersfield, 1.4 miles (2.3 km) east of the village.
