= International Presbyterian Church =

Church in Europe and South Korea

- Classification: Christian
- Orientation: Protestant
- Theology: Calvinism
- Polity: Presbyterian
- Region: United Kingdom, South Korea, Europe
- Headquarters: London
- Founder: Francis Schaeffer
- Origin: 1954
- Congregations: 48
- Official website: ipc.church

The International Presbyterian Church (IPC) is a Reformed church in the United Kingdom, the European Union and South Korea, that holds to the Presbyterian confession of faith, with common commitments, purpose, accountability and governance.

== Origin ==
The church was founded by Francis Schaeffer as a missionary of the Reformed Presbyterian Church (RPCES) in the United States. Schaeffer and his wife, Edith, began L'Abri ("the Shelter") and then started the International Presbyterian Church. They moved from Switzerland to England, bringing the church with them. The first congregation started in Ealing in 1969. They also created congregations among Korean-speaking people, including the London Korean Church.

Missionaries for the church worked in Timișoara, Targu Jiu, Verona, Italy, Ghent, Belgium and Baku, Azerbaijan.

In the 2010s, some dissatisfied evangelical congregations from the Church of Scotland have joined the International Presbyterian Church, with former ministers, elders (males only) and members creating four new Scottish congregations out of existing Church of Scotland congregations (although, one has since closed). These movements to another denomination was especially due to the liberalisation of the Church of Scotland on matters of human sexuality in the twentieth century.

== Organization ==
The IPC has four presbyteries, namely a British Presbytery, a European Proto-Presbytery, Korean Presbytery and a South-Korean Proto-Presbytery which all follow a common Book of Church Order. The IPC website lists 48 congregations in total.

The British Presbytery comprises English-speaking congregations in the United Kingdom. They are:

=== England ===
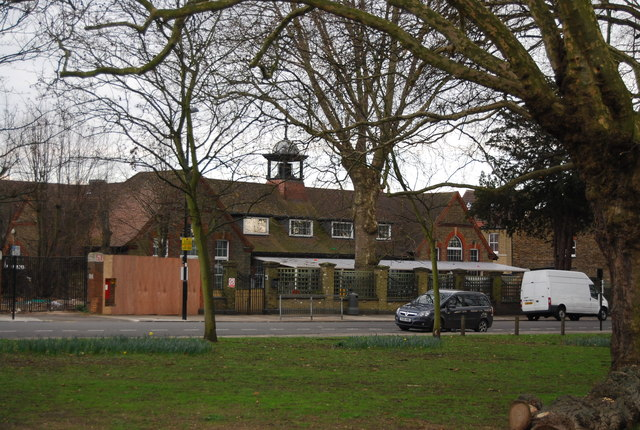
IPC Ealing

- Brentford, Immanuel (planted 2016, minister Iain Clements)
- Brentwood, Immanuel (joined 2024, minister Andrew Grey, assistant minister Gavin Wright)
- Camberwell, Grove Chapel (joined 2024, minister Paul Yeulett)
- Carlisle, Eden Church (planted 2025, minister Andy Ritson)
- Chester, Trinity Church (planted 2021, minister Deiniol Williams)
- Cockfosters, Emmanuel Church North London (joined 2024, minister Steve Hayhow, associate minister Duncan Brisk)
- Coventry, Grace Church (planted 2024, minister Peter Leach)
- Derby, Christ Church (minister Joel Kendall)
- Ealing, IPC (minister Paul Levy, associate minister Reuben Hunter)
- Exeter, All Saints (planted 2024, minister Paul Sutton)
- Hammersmith, Grace Church (planted 2021, minister Rob Ilderton)
- Headington, Christ Church (planted 2024, minister Paul Bolton)
- Hounslow, Town Church (planted 2022, minister Barry Schutter)
- Ilford, All Nations Church (planted 2016, minister Simon Arscott)
- Leeds, Christ Church Central (planted 2017, minister Jonty Rhodes)
- Lincoln, Christ Church (planted 2025, minister Ed Rowett)
- Liss, St Peters (minister James Buchanan)
- Luton, Ebenezer Chapel (planted 2024, minister Garry Williams)
- Manila, Pilgrim Community Church (minister James Chu)
- Pocklington, Christ Presbyterian (planted 2021, minister Adam Wilson)
- Romford, Christ Church (planted 2018, minister David Thomas)
- Salford, Hope Church (planted 2025, minister William Allan)
- Salisbury, Christ Church (joined 2025/26 from Anglican Mission in England, minister Chris Roberts)
- Southall, New Life Masih Ghar (minister Bob Heppe, associate minister Sunny Jaj)
- York, Trinity Church (minister Matthew Roberts)

=== Scotland ===
- Aberdeen, Trinity Church (minister David Gibson, assistant minister Dave Clemo)
- Falkirk, Grace Church (minister Andrew Randall)
- Inverness, Highland International Church (minister James Torrens)

Formerly, there was Grace Community Church, based in Kyle of Lochalsh, Scotland. It closed during 2020.

These Presbyteries form a synod.

== Theology ==
- Westminster Confession of Faith
- Three Forms of Unity
  - Belgic Confession
  - Canons of Dort
  - Heidelberg Catechism

The five statements of the Reformed doctrine:

- Scripture Alone
- Grace Alone
- Faith Alone
- Christ Alone
- Glory of God Alone
