= East Meon =

Village and parish in Hampshire, England

Coordinates: 50.994°N 1.033°W

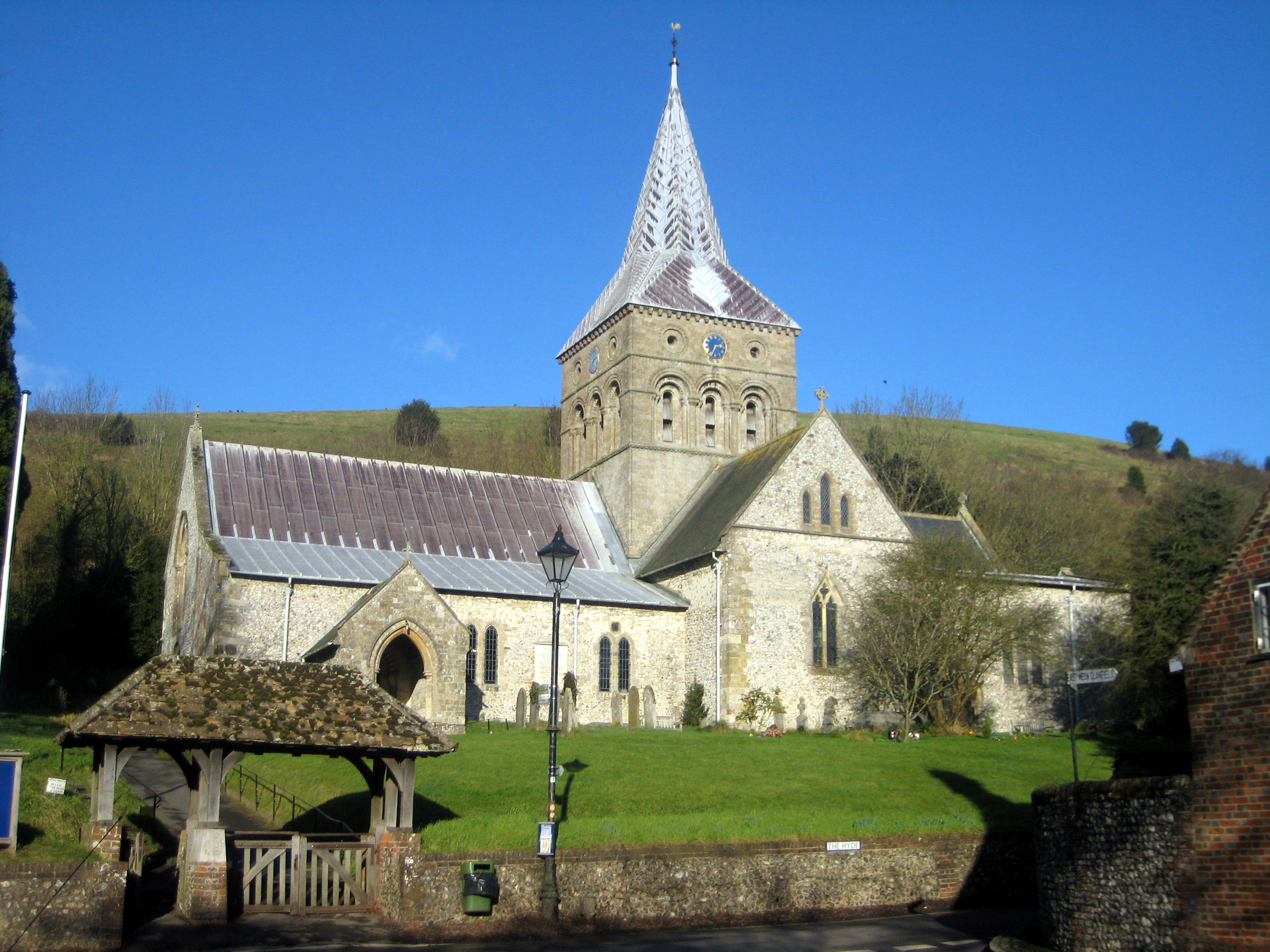
- All Saints' Church, East Meon

- Location within Hampshire
- Population: 1,171; 1,257 (2011 Census including Bolrdean)
- OS grid reference: SU680221
- Civil parish: East Meon
- District: East Hampshire
- Shire county: Hampshire
- Region: South East
- Country: England
- Sovereign state: United Kingdom
- Post town: PETERSFIELD
- Postcode district: GU32
- Dialling code: 01730
- Police: Hampshire and Isle of Wight
- Fire: Hampshire and Isle of Wight
- Ambulance: South Central
- UK Parliament: East Hampshire

East Meon is a village and civil parish in the East Hampshire district of Hampshire, England. It is 4.4 miles (7.1 km) west of Petersfield.

The village is located in the Meon Valley approximately 31 km (19 mi) north of Portsmouth and 98 km (61 mi) southwest of London, on the headwaters of the River Meon. The parish has an area of 11,370 acres (46.0 km^{2}). The boundaries of the present parish of East Meon date back to 1894.

About a mile to the west rises the prominent hill of Henwood Down (201 m). The South Downs Way passes over the southern spur of the hill. Petersfield railway station is the nearest station, 4 miles (6.4 km) east of the village.

== History ==
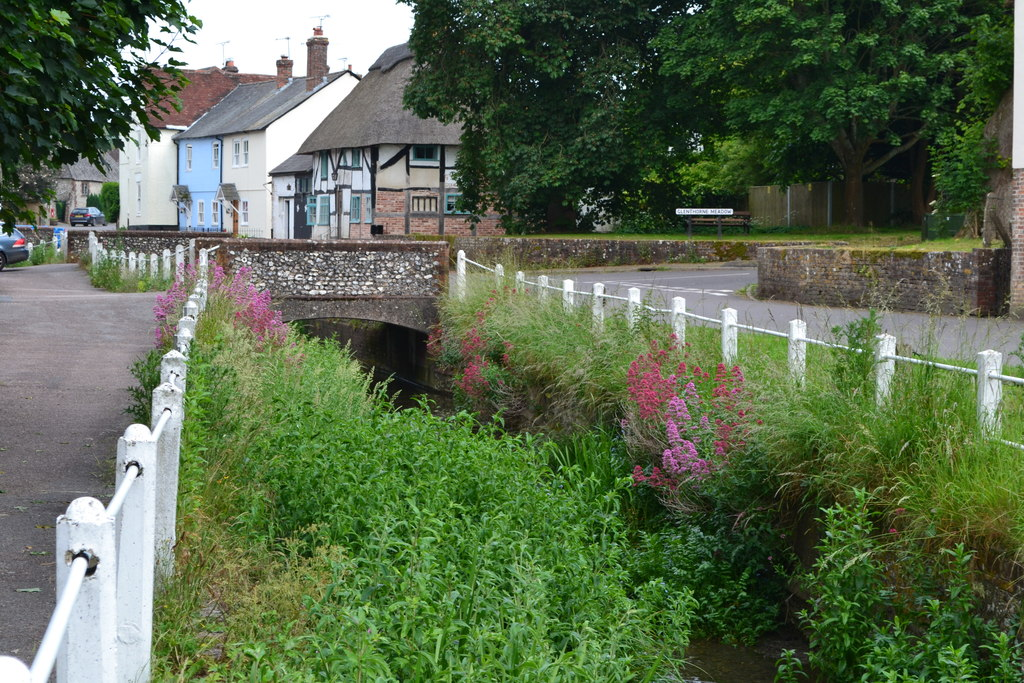
River Meon and High Street

There are Bronze Age burial barrows within the parish of East Meon which date back to around 2000 BC. There is also an Iron Age fort, situated just outside the parish boundaries on Old Winchester Hill, constructed approximately 500 years before the Romans invaded Britain. There is also evidence of Roman occupation in and around the village.

East Meon itself may have originated somewhere between 400 and 600 AD. Then it was part of a Royal Manor belonging first to King Alfred the Great who left it in his will to his youngest son Æthelweard (c.880-922). The Domesday Book of 1086 shows that the Manor then belonged to William the Conqueror; it records six mills and land for 64 ploughs.

About 1280 a family from East Meon, who changed their name to de Meones, moved to Dublin, where they became substantial landowners and gave their name to the suburb of Rathmines.

Opposite the church is the old Court House, with a mediaeval hall dating from the late 15th century. At this time, and for many centuries, East Meon belonged to successive Bishops of Winchester. The Court House was its administrative centre and home to a number of monks who played host to the Bishop when he visited East Meon. They also recorded all manorial imports and exports.

East Meon played its part in the English Civil War of the 1640s. The Parliamentarians camped near the village before the Battle of Cheriton in 1644, and it is said that they stole the lead lining from the font to make their bullets. The battle turned out to be a turning point in the war. During the Second World War, Hitler's Luftwaffe dropped 38 high explosive bombs and an estimated 3,500 incendiary bombs in the Parish; the only loss of life, however, was a pig.

In 1986, the 900th anniversary of the Domesday Book, East Meon was chosen as "The Domesday Village", with a model in Winchester Castle's Great Hall depicting the village as it was then – the model can still be seen alongside the famous tapestry at Bayeux in Normandy.

== All Saints' Church ==
The village church, named "All Saints," was built after the Norman Conquest, and dates between 1075 and 1150. It resembles Winchester Cathedral in style, and like the cathedral, it contains a black marble baptismal font created at Tournai, in what is now Belgium, c. 1130–40. The Tournai font is one of four such fonts in the county of Hampshire. Inside the church, there is a stone, which has the words "Amens Plenty" carved into it, which is said to sit atop the graves of four men buried in the standing position.

== Community ==
There are groups for a variety of interests within the local area. There are also charitable organisations which work in and around the village.

=== Groups ===
- The East Meon Garden Club is a society which organises two East Meon Gardens Open Days, in April and June, seven evening meetings, two visits to gardens and the opportunity to buy seeds and plants, fertilisers and bulbs at discounted prices. It runs a Plant Sale and the annual Flower Show.
- The Care Group work arranging transport to local surgeries and hospitals for people who are unable to get there by themselves.
- There is a weekly lunch held in the Village Hall which is open to local residents over the age of 60. The meat is provided by a local butcher.

=== Local Charity ===
- Forbes Almhouses are perhaps the longest-established institution in East Meon for administering help to the poor and elderly, the Forbes Almshouses are administered and funded by a Charitable Trust, whose aim is to provide basic housing for those of very limited means.
- The Sexton is an independent organisation, registered with The Charities Commission, which funds work on the more unruly sections of the graveyard of All Saints. It also has a mandate to protect the natural habitats of the Church grounds. The Sexton has no direct links to the church itself.
- The Good Causes fund is responsible for considering requests for funding, and ensuring that they are within the guidelines laid down by The Charities Commission. Numerous causes have benefited from the £29,000 donated since the Fund's inception including the Village Hall, youth organisations, the Luncheon Club, East Meon School, Meon Matters, junior sports activities and the Queen's Golden Jubilee and Millennium celebrations.

== Village Hall ==
The Village Hall is a venue with one large hall and a smaller room attached, together with a kitchen, toilets and a stage.

There is an annual May Fair.

== Sport ==
=== Cricket ===
The Cricket Club is a village affair, with its team rooted firmly in East Meon. The club is a Sunday side mainly playing timed matches.

Its ground is located at the South East of the village where the team plays a mixture of local sides and travelling sides from the middle of April to the end of September, the annual sixes competition and village party takes place at the end of June with local sides competing for the East Meon Sixes trophy, and a tour of the Isle of Wight follows in the middle of July.

Needle matches are those against nearby villages, particularly Steep and West Meon. More social events include the games played against the Court House XI, Captain Scott's XI, XIIth Men, IBM, Stoke Makers and the Izaak Lions.
