= Wallop (disambiguation) =

Wallop is a defunct social networking service.

Wallop or Wallops may also refer to:

== Places ==
- The Wallops, a collective name for three villages in Hampshire, England:
  - Middle Wallop
  - Nether Wallop
  - Over Wallop
- Wallops Island, Virginia, USA
  - Wallops Island National Wildlife Refuge
  - Wallops Flight Facility, a rocket launch site

== People ==
- Baron Wallop, a subsidiary title of the Earl of Portsmouth

=== Surnamed ===
- Douglass Wallop (1920–1985), American novelist and playwright
- Gerard Wallop, 9th Earl of Portsmouth (1898–1984), English aristocrat
- Henry Wallop (c. 1540–1599), English politician
- Henry Wallop (died 1642) (1568–1642), English politician
- John Wallop (c. 1490–1551), English soldier and diplomat
- John Wallop (died 1405), English politician
- John Wallop, 1st Earl of Portsmouth (1690–1762), English aristocrat
- John Wallop, 2nd Earl of Portsmouth (1742–1797), English aristocrat
- John Wallop, 3rd Earl of Portsmouth (1767–1853), English aristocrat
- Malcolm Wallop (1933–2011), American politician from Wyoming
- Newton Wallop, 6th Earl of Portsmouth (1856–1917), English aristocrat
- Robert Wallop (1601–1667), English politician, regicide of King Charles I

== Other uses ==
- Wallop (album), a 2019 album by !!!
- The Wallop, 1921 film starring Harry Carey
- WALLOPS, an Internet Relay Chat command
