= Social computing =

Area of computer science

Social computing is an area of computer science that is concerned with the intersection of social behavior and computational systems. It is based on creating or fostering existing social conventions and social contexts through the use of software and technology. Blogs, email, instant messaging, social network services, wikis, social bookmarking and other instances of what is often called social software illustrate ideas from social computing. The rise in social computing is attributed to the prevalence of personal devices and increased overall computing power. This enables a growing number of users to participate in sharing content and interact with another.

== Definitions ==
Humans—and human behavior—are profoundly social. Humans tend to orient to one another and develop abilities to interact with each other and other species. This ranges from expression and gesture through spoken, written, and body language. Humans are influenced by the behavior of those around them and can rely on social context and cues to make decisions. An example of a behavior relying on social contexts is applauding at the end of the play. This is based on the context that the show ended, and other audience members are applauding. Social information provides a basis for inferences, planning, and coordinating activity.

== Examples ==
Common tools include blogs, email, instant messaging, social networking sites, wikis, and social bookmarking platforms. These technologies enable users to generate content, share knowledge, and interact in real time.

== Applications ==
The rise of social computing has highlighted opportunities for businesses. Businesses are interacting on social computing platforms and investing in facilities to support and research social computing.

Business models can leverage the massive customer bases that accumulate through social computing channels. Some organizations have started their own blogs and networks (McAfee, 2006, Joe, 2005). Organizations from diverse industry sectors such as Google, Cisco, and Fox, have sought to acquire or invest in successful social computing enterprises.

A business blog can serve as a source of information and promotion for the company. This allows the company to share content about the company and their initiatives.

Businesses have also interacted with social computing to market themselves and interact with customers. A notable example is Wendy's with their X (formerly Twitter) account. The account was primarily used to promote business promotions and interact with users in a playful or meaningful way.

E-commerce web sites have allowed users to leave reviews and feedback on purchases which has improved online shopping experience for sellers and consumers.

As another example of social computing’s business applications, many e-commerce Web sites have adopted online product/vendor feedback/reputation systems. Such systems provide an asynchronous platform for the consumer community to share experiences collectively and influence their purchasing behavior. They also provide a vehicle for eliciting feedback information valuable to the vendors and e-commerce site operators.

Consumers can use the feedback systems to make a more educated choice on a purchase by comparing reviews between products or vendors. Sellers can track consumer behaviors and trends regarding a product and adjust their supply according to the demand.

== Challenges and criticism ==
Social computing raises several concerns related to privacy, data security, and algorithmic bias. The widespread collection and analysis of user-generated data can lead to ethical dilemmas, especially when users are unaware of how their information is used. Critics also highlight issues of digital labor, surveillance, and the spread of misinformation, which can influence public opinion and social dynamics.

=== Term appearance ===
The term appeared in the mid 1990s after technology advancements and development of the web.

In 1994, the concept of social computing was first proposed by Schuler. He thought, "Social computing is a computing application, with software as the medium or focus of social relationships."

=== Premise ===
The premise of social computing is that it is possible to design digital systems that support useful functionality by making socially produced information available to their users. This information may be provided directly, as when systems show the number of users who have rated a review as helpful or not. Or the information may be provided after being filtered and aggregated, as is done when systems recommend a product based on what else people with similar purchase history have purchased. Alternatively, the information may be provided indirectly, as is the case with Google's page rank algorithms which orders search results based on the number of pages that (recursively) point to them. In all of these cases, information that is produced by a group of people is used to provide or enhance the functioning of a system. Social computing is concerned with systems of this sort and the mechanisms and principles that underlie them.

Social computing can be defined as follows:

"Social Computing" refers to systems that support the gathering, representation, processing, use, and dissemination of information that is distributed across social collectivities such as teams, communities, organizations, and markets. Moreover, the information is not "anonymous" but is significantly precise because it is linked to people, who are in turn linked to other people.

More recent definitions, however, have foregone the restrictions regarding anonymity of information, acknowledging the continued spread and increasing pervasiveness of social computing. As an example, Hemmatazad, N. (2014) defined social computing as "the use of computational devices to facilitate or augment the social interactions of their users, or to evaluate those interactions in an effort to obtain new information."

Social computing has to do with supporting "computations" that are carried out by groups of people, an idea that has been popularized in James Surowiecki's book, The Wisdom of Crowds. Examples of social computing in this sense include collaborative filtering, online auctions, reputation systems, computational social choice, tagging, and verification games. The social information processing page focuses on this sense of social computing.

== History ==
=== Technology infrastructure ===
Users were able to interact more with websites after the development of Web 2.0. This was an advancement from Web 1.0. Comode G. and Krishnamurthy B. (2008) note that "content creators were few in Web 1.0 with the vast majority of users simply acting as consumers of content."

Web 2.0 provided functionalities that allowed for low-cost web-hosting services and introduced features with browser windows that used basic information structure and expanded it to as many devices as possible using HTTP, or Hypertext Transfer Protocol.

Sometimes referred to as "Enterprise 2.0", a term derived from Web 2.0, social software for enterprise generally refers to the use of social computing in corporate intranets and in other medium- and large-scale business environments. It consisted of a class of tools that allowed for networking and social changes to businesses at the time. It was a layering of the business tools on Web 2.0 and brought forth several applications and collaborative software with specific uses.

Finance

Electronic negotiation, which first came up in 1969 and was adapted over time to suit financial markets networking needs, represents an important and desirable coordination mechanism for electronic markets. Negotiation between agents (software agents as well as humans) allows cooperative and competitive sharing of information to determine a proper price. Recent research and practice has also shown that electronic negotiation is beneficial for the coordination of complex interactions among organizations. Electronic negotiation has recently emerged as a very dynamic, interdisciplinary research area covering aspects from disciplines such as Economics, Information Systems, Computer Science, Communication Theory, Sociology and Psychology.

Social computing has become more widely known because of its relationship to a number of recent trends. These include the growing popularity of social software and Web 3.0, increased academic interest in social network analysis, the rise of open source as a viable method of production, and a growing conviction that all of this can have a profound impact on daily life. A February 13, 2006 paper by market research company Forrester Research suggested that:

Easy connections brought about by cheap devices, modular content, and shared computing resources are having a profound impact on our global economy and social structure. Individuals increasingly take cues from one another rather than from institutional sources like corporations, media outlets, religions, and political bodies. To thrive in an era of Social Computing, companies must abandon top-down management and communication tactics, weave communities into their products and services, use employees and partners as marketers, and become part of a living fabric of brand loyalists.

=== Developments ===
PLATO was one of the earliest examples of social computing in a live production environment with initially hundreds and soon thousands of users. The PLATO computer system was developed by the University of Illinois at Urbana Champaign in 1960s. In the 70s, the system supported social software applications for multi-user chat rooms, group message forums, and instant messaging.

In 1974, email was made available as well as the world's first online newspaper called NewsReport, which supported content submitted by the user community as well as written by editors and reporters.

Chat rooms were an early instance of social computing. A notable chatroom was AOL Instant Messenger, which according "to PC Magazine, AOL Instant Messenger had over 200 million registered users as of November 2003."

Another early instance of social computing is blogging. A blog is a web page where a user can add text and/or images to express ideas and opinions. This could range from personal experiences to commentary on news/topics. In the mid 1990s, users began creating web-blogs and sharing their thoughts on the web. This attracted users to read and discuss blogs online. Blogs have become a fundamental basis to the formation of social networks which incorporates the idea of users expressing themselves through text or images for others to view.

== Theoretical foundations ==
Socially intelligent computing is a new term that refers to the recent efforts of individuals to understand the ways in which systems of people and computers will prove useful as intermediaries between people and tools used by people. These systems result in new behaviors that occur as a result of the complex interaction between humans and computers and can be explained by several different areas of science. The Foundations of Social Computing are deeply vested in the understanding of social psychology and cyberpsychology. Social psychology covers topics such as decision making, persuasion, group behavior, personal attraction, and factors that promote health and well-being. Cognitive sciences also play a huge role in understanding social computing and human behavior on networking elements driven by personal needs/means. Sociology is also a factor since overall environments decide how individuals choose to interact.

== Social software ==
Social software can be any computational system that supports social interactions among groups of people. The following are examples of such systems.

=== Social media ===
Social media is one of the most common ways of interacting through personal computer and mobile devices. According to Pew Research, Facebook is one of the most used social media platforms with 63% of American adults reported using it in 2023. There are many other platforms for social media such as Instagram, X, and Snapchat. Social media has evolved to allow users to interact beyond texting through pictures, videos, GIFs, and other forms of multimedia. This allows users to have an enhanced and richer form of expression and interactions. Within the last decade, social media has become a prominent focus of social computing due to the large volume of interactions occurring.

=== Social networking ===
Social networking sites allow users to build or enhance their professional or personal network online. LinkedIn, an example of this, is a professional social network that allows users to connect with other users who commonly share similar work and education backgrounds. Users use these sites to share, search, and interact with opportunities and accomplishments.

=== Wiki pages ===
A wiki is a platform that allows users, regardless of expertise, to collaborate and provide knowledge on topics for the public to view. A wiki aims to be a neutral and an accurate online encyclopedia. Some popular wikis are Wikipedia and Fandom.com.

=== Blogs ===
Tumblr-2

A blog is a web page that allows individuals, groups, and business to share opinions and information about single or multiple topics of their choice.

Five of the best blogging platforms include Tumblr, WordPress, Squarespace, Blogger, and Posterous. These sites enable users, whether it be a person, company, or organization, to express certain ideas, thoughts, and/or opinions on either a single or variety of subjects. There are also a new technology called webloging which are sites that hosts blogs such as Myspace and Xanga. Both blogs and weblogging are very similar in that they act as a form of social computing where they help form social relations through one another such as gaining followers, trending using hashtags, or commenting on a post providing an opinion on a blog.

According to a study conducted by Rachael Kwai Fun IP and Christian Wagner, some features of weblogs that attract users and support blogs and weblogs as an important aspect of social computing in forming and strengthening relationships are: content management tools, community building tools, time structuring, search by category, commentary, and the ability to secure closed blogs.

Blogs are also highly used in social computing concepts in order to understand human behaviors amongst online communities through a concept called social network analysis. Social network analysis (SNA) is "a discipline of social science that seeks to explain social phenomena through a structural interpretation of human interaction both as a theory and a methodology". There are certain links that occur in blogs, weblogs in this case, where they have different functions that portray different types of information such as Permalink, Blogrolls, Comments, and Trackbacks.

One recent example of social computing is how platforms like TikTok use community engagement and user feedback to influence content recommendation algorithms, effectively blending algorithmic curation with social behavior.

=== Online gaming ===
Online gaming is the social behavior of interacting with other users while playing an online game. Online gaming can occur on multiple, different platforms; common ones include personal computers, Xbox, PlayStation, and mobile devices. Users are able to communicate with other players through live voice calls and text messages.

=== Online dating ===
Online dating platforms allow users to connect and interact with other users for romantic or platonic purposes. Users can create a profile to view and like other users. A mutual like between users allows them to match and be able to communicate through a text chat. Some notable online dating platforms are Tinder, Match.com, and Bumble. Online dating has allowed users to start personal relationships with people outside of their frequently visited places and commutable distances.

=== Live streaming ===
Live streaming is broadcasting live video and audio footage through the internet. It is often used to livestream news, video-game gameplay, and/or discussions. Some of the most popular livestreaming websites are Twitch and YouTube. These platforms allow users with an account to start a livestream and become a live-streamer. Users also use these platforms to view and interact with livestreams mostly through built-in online text chat. This allows the live streamer and viewers to interact in real-time.

=== Virtual reality ===
Virtual reality is a computer simulated experience that allows users to be immersed in a virtual world. Users can use virtual reality to participate in activities such as video games. A virtual reality headset allows users to experience and communicate with other users. This allows users to communicate with others through a near-real life experience without the abilities of smell or touch.

=== Other platforms ===
There are some platforms where user to user interactions is more indirect. Online maps such as Google Maps and Waze allow users to navigate the world. These applications also allow users to report or modify information which provides accurate updates. Google Maps notably allows users to write reviews on businesses. These reviews are public and can be interacted by the business or other users. The interactions on these platforms improve the functionality and service of the application.

== Socially intelligent computing ==
Groups of people interact with these social computing systems in a variety of ways, all of which may be described as socially intelligent computing.

=== Crowdsourcing ===
Crowdsourcing consists of a group of participants that work collaboratively either for pay or as volunteers to produce a good or service. A few examples include Wikipedia, which allows users to contribute their knowledge to a topic, and GoFundMe, which allows users to donate money to individuals or communities in need. Other crowdsourcing platforms like Amazon Mechanical Turk allow individuals to perform simple tasks that can be accumulated into a larger project.

=== Dark social media ===
The Dark social media are the social media tools used to collaborate between individuals where contents are supposed to be only available to the participants. However, unlike mobile phone calls or messaging where information is sent from one user, transmitted through a medium and stored on each user devices, with the medium having no storage permission of the actual content of the data, more and more communication methods include a centralized server where all the contents are received, stored, and then transmitted. Some examples of these new mechanisms include Google Doc, Facebook Messages or Snapchat. All of the information passes through these channels has largely been unaccounted for by users themselves and the data analytics. However, in addition to their respective users private companies (Facebook, Twitter, Snapchat) that provided these services do have complete control over such data. The number of images, links, referrals and information pass through digital is supposed to be completely unaccounted for in the marketing scheme of things.

== Social science theories ==
=== Collective intelligence ===
Collective intelligence is considered an area relating to social computing because of the group collaboration aspect. Collective intelligence refers to the intelligence that a group of users can provide through collective efforts compared to an individual user. Wikipedia is an example because a group of users contributing to a topic result in a higher quality wiki page. Users can also benefit from collective intelligence by learning from its results.

=== Social perceptions ===
Recent research has begun to look at interactions between humans and their computers in groups. This line of research focuses on the interaction as the primary unit of analysis by drawing from fields such as psychology, social psychology, and sociology.

== Current research ==
Since 2007, research in social computing has become more popular for researchers and professionals in multiple fields dealing with technology, business and politics. A study performed by affiliates of Washington State University used a latent semantic analysis on academic papers containing the term "social computing" to find that topics in social computing converge into the three major themes of Knowledge Discovery, Knowledge Sharing and Content Management. Social computing continues to shift the direction of research in Information Sciences as a whole, extending social aspects into technological and corporate domains. Companies and industries such as Google, Cisco and Fox have invested in such endeavors. Possible questions to be answered through social computing research include how to form stable communities, how these communities evolve, how knowledge is created and processed, how people are motivated to participate, etc.

Currently, research in the areas of social computing is being done by many well-known labs owned by Microsoft and Massachusetts Institute of Technology. The team at Microsoft has taken off with a mission statement of "To research and develop software that contributes to compelling and effective social interactions." They take a main focus on user-centered design processes. They also add rapid prototyping combined with rigorous science to bring forth complete projects and research that can impact the social computing field. Current projects being worked on by the Microsoft team include Hotmap, SNARF, Slam, and Wallop. MIT, however, has a goal of creating software that shapes our cities and more in depth:

"More specifically, (1) we create micro-institutions in physical space, (2) we design social processes that allow others to replicate and evolve those micro-institutions, and (3) we write software that enables those social processes. We use this process to create more robust, decentralized, human-scale systems in our cities. We are particularly focused on reinventing our current systems for learning, agriculture, and transportation."

The current research projects at the MIT social computing lab include The Dog Programming Language, Wildflower Montessori, and You Are Here. A broad overview of what to expect from newly started Wildflower Montessori is as follows:

"Wildflower Montessori School is a pilot Lab School and the first in a new network of learning centers. Its aim is to be an experiment in a new learning environment, blurring the boundaries between coffee shops and schools, between home-schooling and institutional schooling, between tactile, multisensory methods and abstract thinking. Wildflower will serve as a research platform to test new ideas in advancing the Montessori Method in the context of modern fluencies, as well as to test how to direct the organic growth of a social system that fosters the growth and connection of such schools."

== Consequences ==
=== Benefits ===
==== Research purposes ====
Researchers can use social computing platforms to study human behavior and events because of the large amount of information and content being shared by users. This allows researchers to conduct studies in a non-invasive manner.

== Future predictions ==
=== Virtual worlds ===
The future of social computing has profound effects of on how humans interact with others and the world.

Virtual worlds, where thousands of people can interact simultaneously within the same simulated three-dimensional space, represent a frontier in social computing with critical implications for business, education, social sciences, technological sciences, and our society at large.

According to Messinger et al. (2009), virtual worlds "provide a rich real-time form of social and economic interaction with numerous applications and subsequent implications."

=== Artificial intelligence ===
Artificial intelligence has been a new development in technology and its interactions with humans is furthering the understanding of social computing.

New frontiers of social computing are on the horizon...most recently the catalysis of novel social interaction between humans and AI companions, assistants, chatbots, devices and appliances, and between these nonhuman intelligent agents

== Conferences ==
- Computer-supported cooperative work (CSCW)
- SIGCHI

== See also ==
- Computer-mediated communication
- Game theory
- Folksonomy
- Groupware
- Human-based computation
- Human-centered computing
- Multi-agent system
- Open innovation
- Social choice
- Social machine
- Social network
- Social software engineering
- Sociology
- Symbiotic intelligence
- Web 2.0
- Research institutions
  - MIT Media Lab
  - Cosmos Lab
  - GroupLens Research
  - HCII
