= John Green (radio producer) =

English radio producer and executive

John Dennis Fowler Green (9 May 1909 – 25 March 2000) was an English radio producer and executive at the BBC. He was also known as an agriculturist and farmer.

== Early life ==
He was the son of Capt. Henry Green and his wife Amy Gertrude Rock, married in 1904, of Chedworth, Gloucestershire. He was educated at Cheltenham College and was a student at Peterhouse, Cambridge.

== Early politics ==
While an undergraduate, Green was President of the Cambridge Union. During a visit to the Oxford Union, on 13 February 1930, he was involved in a debate on "House believes Fascism is necessary". The record shows that "He argued that no one is interested in politics any more, so they should be left to Mussolini."

John Platts-Mills encountered Green at meetings of the English Mistery in the early 1930s. In 1931, as chairman of the Cambridge University Conservative Association, Green wrote an essay dedicated to Gerard Wallop, Viscount Lymington of the English Mistery: it was for Dorothy Crisp's collection The Rebirth of Conservatism. At book length, he produced Mr. Baldwin. A Study in Post-war Conservatism (1933).

In 1934, Green wrote in The National Review on Anthony Ludovici, in an article "Youth Speaks Out II.—A Political Writer". Green with William Sanderson, Wallop and Ludovici advocated for a return to a medieval constitution. Part I of "Youth Speaks Out", in the same issue, was by Duncan Sandys, with title "The British Movement", on a short-lived "rightist" conservative group. Editorial comment was:

In the first article Mr. Duncan Sandys tells us what he is trying to do in the British Movement. In the second article Mr. John Green, a member of the English Mistery, a high loyalist Tory group, tells us about the writer who sets forth the ideals of his society.

Ludovici's Violence, Sacrifice and War (1933), Creation and Recreation (1934) and Recovery: the Quest of regenerate national values (1935) were published by the St James Kin cell of the English Mistery; to whom he had lectured, on the Alexander technique. Green attended a 1939 private dinner of the Mistery, in his capacity as Constable of the St James Kin.

== Career ==
Called to the bar at the Inner Temple in 1933, Green was brought into the BBC by Lord Reith in 1934. According to Hendy, it was to "help whip leftish producers into line." In 1935 Green produced a monthly radio series "Empire at Work".

Green innovated with a regular gardening talk, given by C. H. Middleton. Initially Middleton was one of a group of speakers found by the Royal Horticultural Society. He was given his own weekly programme, In the Garden, in September 1934. Green introduced also "For Farmers Only", on agricultural topics, cancelled on the outbreak of World War II but then reinstated. Green held the post of Agricultural Liaison Officer, and it was the ancestor of Farming Today. Post-war, Green was involved in discussion of the BBC's factual content, and set up the radio series "At Home And Abroad" of the 1950s, which included interviews of world leaders.

In 1956 Green became Controller of the Talks Division of BBC Radio, for five years. Regarded by Asa Briggs as "a strong and forthright character in his own right", he played a role as mediator on news co-operation, on behalf of the Director-General Ian Jacob, between Tahu Hole and Cecil McGivern. He was instrumental in the 1957 recruitment of Ian McIntyre, whose background had some features in common with his own. When Hugh Greene was promoted to Director, News and Current Affairs, around 1958, it was on Green's recommendation. He at one point gave an opinion of Greene: "I think he's got the stuff of which Cromwells are made; his absence of sensitivity doesn't worry him." Greene immediately quarrelled with Hole, who was moved from news.

Greene came in as Director-General in 1960, succeeding Jacob. He abolished Green's Controller post in 1961, and the Talks Division was merged into Current Affairs Talks, under J. H. Camacho. In 1962 John Green left the BBC.

== Farm and family background ==
The Green family moved over several generations from the Birmingham area to Gloucestershire. John Simmons Green of Nechells died in 1841, leaving a son, John Fowler Green, and a daughter Mary, who married Robert Baynes. The Rev. John Fowler Green (died 1904, at age 80), was son of Mrs Green of Nechell's Cottage, Saltley, a Cambridge graduate and cleric, becoming vicar of Whiteshill. He had four sons: Francis Joseph of Solihull, who inherited property at Gravelly Hill; and provided for a division of property on his widow's death to his sons Francis Joseph (at Nechells), John Edward (farm at Appleton-le-Street), Henry (house property at St Clement's Road, Aston juxta Birmingham), and Andrew (ground rents at St Clement's Road).

The Rev. John Edward Green (25 December 1861 – 12 December 1943) was a Cambridge graduate and cleric, vicar of Lower Guiting, and son of the Rev. John Fowler Green. He purchased, from John Scott, 3rd Earl of Eldon, the Chedworth Manor farm estate in Gloucestershire. The estate was farmed by Henry Green, his brother; and John Dennis Fowler Green, as son of Henry Green, inherited it on his father's death in 1947. He took over running of the farm himself in 1978.

== Agricultural interests ==
In 1945–7 Green went on a Special Agricultural Mission to Australia and New Zealand, on behalf of the Ministry of Agriculture, Fisheries and Food. He was President of the National Pig Breeders Association, 1955–6.

In his final year at the BBC, Green visited Australia and New Zealand, looking into local radio. He then retired to Gloucestershire, chairing the Agricultural Advisory Council 1963–8. In 1981, he wrote in the Journal of the Royal Agricultural Society of England on agricultural broadcasting.

== Family ==
Green married in 1946 Diana Judith Elwes (1913–1996), daughter of Lieut.-Col. Henry Cecil Elwes of Colesbourne, son of Henry John Elwes; she was a magistrate.
