= William Wallop =

English Member of Parliament

William Wallop (c. 1553 - 15 November 1617), of Southampton and Wield, Hampshire, esquire, was an English Member of Parliament (MP).

== Biography ==
William Waloppe (modernized as William Wallop) was the second son of Sir Oliver Wallop (d. 1566) of Farleigh Wallop in Hampshire. His elder brother Henry Wallop inherited the estates of their father and of their uncle, Sir John Wallop.

William was a Member of the Parliament of England for Lymington in 1586 and followed his brother by being chosen for Southampton in 1597.

He was appointed a justice of the peace, and was High Sheriff of Hampshire in 1599. He served thrice as mayor of Southampton.

He had three wives, but died without issue in his 84th year of age. His third wife Margery, daughter of John Fisher of Chilton Candover esquire, paid for his burial and monument in the Wield parish church.

== Gallery ==
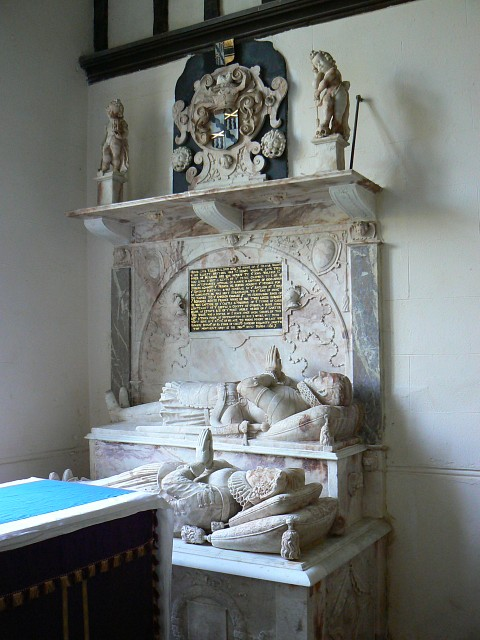
Memorial to William Waloppe esquire

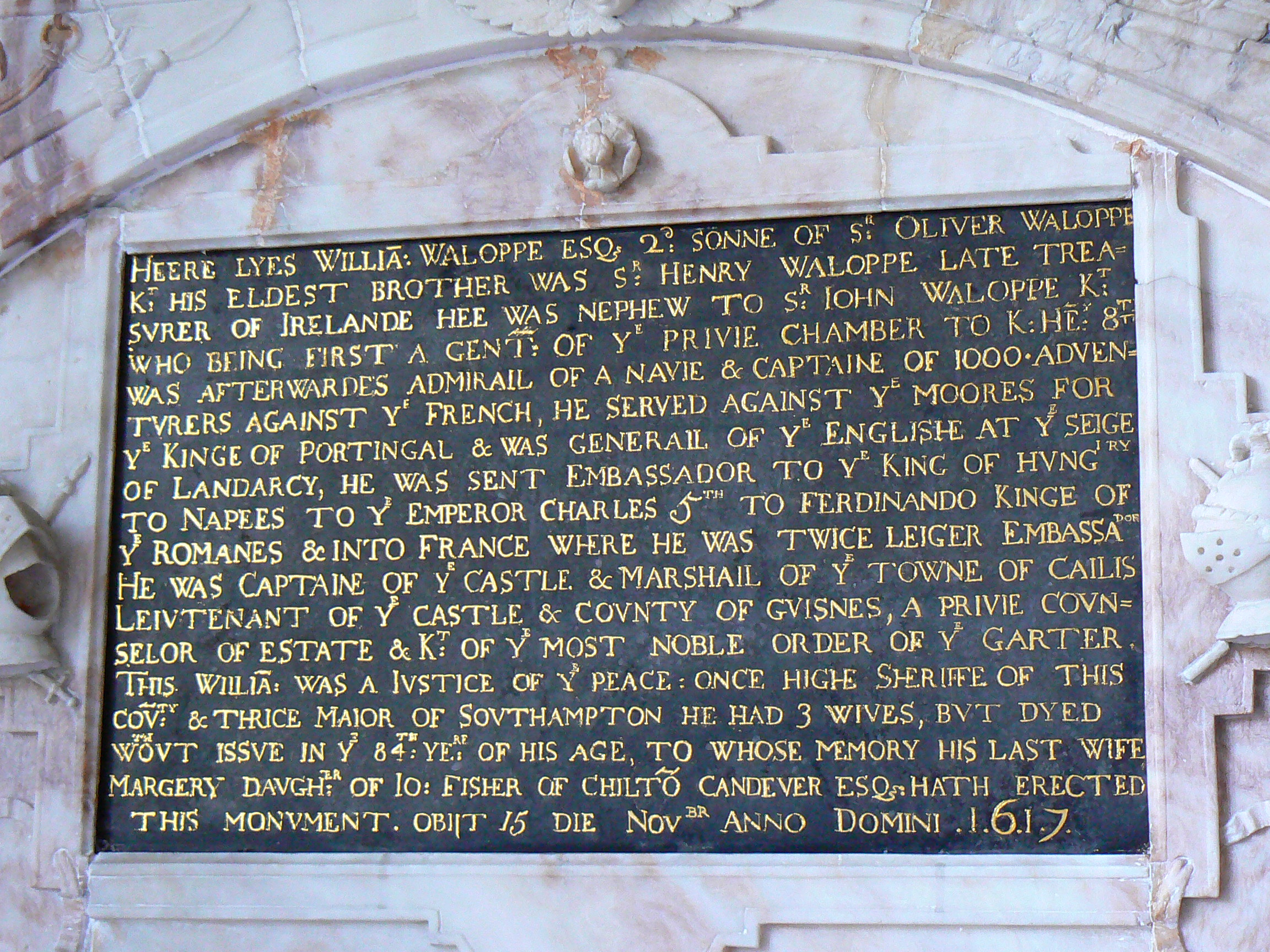
Memorial to William Waloppe esquire
