= English Mistery =

Organization

- Formation: 1930
- Type: Conservatism; Toryism; Integral nationalism Anti-democracy; Neo-feudalism; Ultra-royalism; White supremacy
- Location: England, United Kingdom
- Key people: William Sanderson; Anthony Ludovici

The English Mistery ("Mistery" being an old word for a guild) was a political and esoteric group active in the United Kingdom of the 1930s. A "Conservative fringe group" in favour of bringing back the feudal system, its views have been characterised as "reactionary, ultra-royalist, and anti-democratic". The organisation was opposed to social welfare, the London School of Economics, and the United States.

== Background ==
The London barrister William John Sanderson (1883–1941) was the son of W. J. Sanderson of Gosforth, educated at Marlborough College, and graduating LL.B. at Jesus College, Cambridge; he was called to the bar at the Inner Temple in 1906. He was, before World War I, at the centre of a group of "Royalist and Loyalist" young men. Some of those were associated with the chambers of F. E. Smith; and very many of them died in the war in France. In 1917, he founded the Order of the Red Rose, an anti-Semitic group opposed to finance capitalism, with the zoologist George Percival Mudge, and the academic Arthur Gray.

Sanderson had notions that if the mystical "lost secrets" of the English could be discovered, then the sort of society he envisioned could be created or as he saw it recreated. The "lost secrets" of the English that Sanderson sought were the "Secret of Memory" as opposed to the "paraphernalia of learning"; the "Secret of Race" as only Englishmen with good genes would have sex with Englishwomen of equally good genes; the "Secret of Government"; the "Secret of Power" which had been destroyed by "industrial ideals"; the "Secret of Organisation"; the "Secret of Property" (i.e. feudalism as a social system); and the "Secret of Economics" which had lost due to "moneyed interests". He knew of Italian Fascism through the work of Harold Goad. In a letter of 1937, he wrote of his personal contacts with Camillo Pellizzi (it:Camillo Pellizzi), Luigi Villari and Dino Grandi. He joined the Imperial Fascist League. In his pamphlet, An Introduction to the English Mistery, Sanderson wrote that there were two types of "aliens", namely "the Dutch, Danes and other peoples of north-west Europe" vs. "some races on the other hand differ very widely from us both in character and tradition". Sanderson was described by all who knew him as a deeply unpleasant man with repulsive views such as his statement that people who became seriously ill did not deserve sympathy and that God only cared about the lives of rich people. The fact that Sanderson was a very small man whose own illness left him unable to walk did not stop him from preaching the doctrine that only the lives of healthy, attractive, and well off people mattered as he had no compassion for the poor and/or the sick.

Dan Stone has stated that the importance of the English Mistery lay "in the fact that it had links, both personal and ideological, with much wider strands of thought in interwar Britain." Sanderson founded the group in 1930, to promote his view of leadership. It took its title from his book of that year, That Which Was Lost: A Treatise on Freemasonry and the English Mistery.

== Membership ==
Close colleagues of Sanderson in the founding group of English Mistery were Bryant Godman Irvine, Ben Shaw and Norman Swan. Conservative MPs Michael Beaumont and Reginald Dorman-Smith joined. Later Beaumont left: both he and Dorman-Smith found the Mistery inactive in practical terms. Beaumont in 1930 introduced Gerard Wallop (courtesy title Viscount Lymington to 1943) to Sanderson; Wallop found him to be "a very short physically myopic Northumbrian". Wallop accepted Sanderson's offer to become the "executive leader" of the Mistery. By 1933, it was said that Wallop had "attracted around him a band of devoted young men, known collectively as the English Mistery, who seek the ideal of aristocratic rule" in a "semi-masonic order". Wallop eventually split the group in 1936, forming his successor organisation, the English Array.

John Platts-Mills belonged to the group; he was recruited in 1931 via the Apollo University Lodge in Oxford and Godman Irvine, being driven to Lincoln's Inn to meet Sanderson. His autobiography records that at this time Sanderson held weekly soirées, largely social, and more intense Thursday meetings at which short papers were read. He gained a pupillage in 1932, at 5 Essex Court Chambers, and almost simultaneously had an offer to stand for parliament from the Duke of Devonshire, to replace Edward Marjoribanks. He left the Mistery over its anti-Semitism, with the rise of Hitler. His flat at 2, Paper Buildings, Inner Temple, was reportedly used for meetings of the Mistery for a time. He mentions as members John de Rutzen, John Davenport, and John Dennis Fowler Green (1909–2000) who became a BBC radio producer.

The Mistery's members included the British Nietzschean Anthony Ludovici, a prolific writer for the movement and former of its ideology, and the journalist Collin Brooks, member of both the Grosvenor Kin and St James Kin in London. Others were Rolf Gardiner, Peter Kemp, and Graham Seton Hutchison, founder in 1933 of the pro-Nazi and anti-Semitic National Workers' Movement, and the retired army officer Cecil de Sausmarez. Hutchison worked in the pay of Alfred Rosenberg, the "official philosopher" of the NSDAP who also headed the Außenpolitisches Amt (Foreign Policy Office) of the NSDAP.

As for the British Union of Fascists, many of the group's members were "aristocratic revivalists and Diehard peers of the Edwardian period". Henry William John Edwards wrote in 1938 (referring though to 1935) of "a Nietzschean Tory of the kind which finds a way into membership of the English Mistery". A private dinner for the English Mistery took place on 29 April 1939, in the Grand Hotel, Hanley, Staffordshire. The 40 to 50 men who attended wore red roses. The officers of the Mistery were Thomas Scott-Ellis, 8th Baron Howard de Walden (High Steward), with William Sanderson, Roger Gresham Cooke, John Green and Henry Snell.

== Ideology ==
Sanderson was a Freemason but disaffected, and author of a book Statecraft (1927). Bernhard Dietz has described Statecraft as a "racist, antisemitic and misogynistic fundamental critique of modern industrial society", where Sanderson offered up as an alternative "the mythical fantasy of a masculine, military society".

The English Mistery envisioned their ideal England as a country with a strict hierarchy and inhabited by a nation of "racially pure" Englishmen who were led by an absolute monarch and supported by strong leaders. It was elitist and consciously chose not to become a mass movement, because, as one of its pamphlets stated, "we do not want millions of ineffective members". It was organised into "kins" with an average of 10–30 or so members. Being firmly anti-democratic, the group regarded the emergence of modern parliamentary democracy and universal suffrage as disasters.

In the group's view, "submissive" races and peoples could be the victim of brutalities and slaughter, but to them this was a good thing:

Surely, therefore, the time has come to recognise the inevitability of violence and sacrifice, and consciously to select the section or elements in the world or the nation that should be sacrificed.

Stone comments: "The slaughter of primitive peoples as a way of venting the Englishman's excess energy, has been long a mainstay of British imperial thinking." The Mistery was quite sexist and did not accept women as members. The British historian Daniel Stone noted that antifeminism was one of the strongest motivations for the Mistery as the group's publications, especially those by Anthony Ludovici brim with resentment and fury over women making demands for equality.

One of the English Mistery's leaders, Rolf Gardiner, wrote about the group in the April 1936 edition of the Deutsche Akademische Austauschdienst journal where he declared:

The members of this organisation, which brings together employers and workers in organic groups and constellations, call themselves 'Royalists'. They want to make the king once again the leader of the English people. The king should no longer simply be the bearer of the Crown, but the living embodiment of the State's power and of the deepest will of the people. From criticism of the Conservative Party, liberal through and through, they have moved towards a contemplation of the forms of English government before Cromwell. They want to revive long lost Germanic traditions in the English social order.

== Break-up ==
In 1936, the English Mistery fell apart owing to a dispute between Sanderson and Lord Lymington. The vast majority of the English Mistery led by Lymington left to found a new group, English Array while Sanderson remained the leader of a rump.

== Sources ==
- Conford, Philip (2005). "Organic Society: Agriculture and Radical Politics in the Career of Gerard Wallop, Ninth Earl of Portsmouth (1898-1984)" (PDF). Agricultural History Review. 53 (1): 78–96.
- Dietz, Bernhard (2018). Neo-Tories The Revolt of British Conservatives Against Democracy and Political Modernity (1929-1939). London: Bloomsbury Publishing. ISBN 9781472570031.
- Griffiths, Richard (1980). Fellow Travellers of the Right British Enthusiasts for Nazi Germany, 1933-9. Oxford: Oxford University Press. ISBN 0094634602.
- Stone, D. (2003). "The English Mistery, the BUF, and the Dilemmas of British fascism". The Journal of Modern History. 75 (2): 336–358. doi:10.1086/380138. S2CID 144063585.
