= Quentin Wallop, 10th Earl of Portsmouth =

British peer

The Right Honourable The Earl of Portsmouth DL
- Earl of Portsmouth
- Tenure: 28 September 1984-present
- Predecessor: Gerard Vernon Wallop, 9th Earl of Portsmouth
- Other titles: 10th Earl of Portsmouth; 10th Viscount Lymington; 10th Baron Wallop; Hereditary Bailiff of Burley, New Forest
- Born: Quenton Gerard Carew Wallop; 25 July 1954 (age 71)
- Residence: Farleigh Wallop
- Spouses: Candia Frances Juliet McWilliam (m. 1981; div. 1984) Annabel Fergusson (m. 1990)
- Issue: Oliver Henry Wallop, Viscount Lymington; Lady Clementine Wallop; Lady Rose Wallop
- Parents: Oliver Kintzing Wallop, Viscount Lymington; Ruth Violet Sladen

Quentin Gerard Carew Wallop, 10th Earl of Portsmouth, DL (born 25 July 1954), styled Viscount Lymington in 1984, is a British peer and current head of the Wallop family.

== Early life ==
Quentin Wallop was born on 25 July 1954, the son of Oliver Kintzing Wallop, Viscount Lymington (d. 1984) and Ruth Violet née Sladen (d. 1978). His mother was the second daughter of Brigadier General Gerald Carew Sladen and his wife Mabel Ursula Orr-Ewing, a daughter of Sir Archibald Ernest Orr-Ewing. Before his parents' marriage, she had previously been the wife of Richard Desborough Malcolm Mason, of Mau Narok, Kenya. He is the great-grandson of Edward Bosc Sladen, a British army officer.

He was educated at Eton College.

== Career ==
In June 1984, on his father’s death, Quentin Wallop became his grandfather’s heir, and on his grandfather’s death in September 1984 he succeeded him as Earl of Portsmouth and as owner of the estate in Hampshire. From 1987 until 2002, he was a non-executive director of the Grainger Trust, whose principal activity is property investment and trading and which in 1998 was reported to have made £8.4 million on a turnover of £44 million. As of 1999, he owned 16.55% of the equity, making him the firm's largest shareholder.

He took his seat as an hereditary peer in the House of Lords, but rarely spoke there.

A supporter of hunting, Wallop was Chairman of the Hampshire branch of the Game Conservancy Trust from 2001 to 2005. He is a Liveryman of the Worshipful Company of Fishmongers, President of the Basingstoke Conservative Association, patron of the Hampshire branch of the British Red Cross, and churchwarden of St Andrew's Church, Farleigh Wallop.

In 1988, Wallop helped to fund £376,000 of the legal expenses of Nikolai Tolstoy in defending his libel case against Lord Aldington. He also helped fund the legal expenses of Neil Hamilton in defending his libel case against Mohammed Al-Fayed.

== Personal life ==
On 10 February 1981, he married the author Candia McWilliam, the only daughter of Colin McWilliam of Edinburgh. Before divorcing in 1985, they had two children:

- Oliver Henry Rufus Wallop, Viscount Lymington (born 22 December 1981), who later married the designer Flora Pownall.
- Lady Clementine Violet Rohais Wallop (born 20 November 1983)

Lord and Lady Portsmouth divorced in 1984 and both subsequently remarried. In 1990 Portsmouth married secondly Annabel Fergusson, daughter of Dr. Ian Fergusson, and they have one daughter:

- Lady Rose Hermione Annabel Wallop (born 23 October 1990).

Wallop lives at the family seat, Farleigh House in Farleigh Wallop, Hampshire.

Peerage of Great Britain
Preceded by Gerard Wallop	Earl of Portsmouth; 1984–present	Incumbent
