= Henry Drummond Wolff (Basingstoke MP) =

British politician (1899–1982)

Member of Parliament for Basingstoke
- In office 19 April 1934 – 25 October 1935
- Preceded by: Viscount Lymington
- Succeeded by: Patrick Donner
- Majority: 6,885

Personal details
- Born: Henry Maxence Cavendish Drummond Wolff; 16 July 1899
- Died: 8 February 1982 (aged 82)
- Party: Conservative
- Relations: Henry Drummond Wolff (grandfather)
- Profession: Industrialist

Henry Maxence Cavendish Drummond Wolff (16 July 1899 – 8 February 1982), commonly known as Henry Drummond Wolff, was a British Conservative Party politician. Drummond Wolff was known for his close ties to the far right.

== Political career ==
From early in his political career, Drummond Wolff's outlook was defined by his twin hatreds for laissez-faire capitalism and socialism, opinions that would lead him to become sympathetic to fascism as an alternative.

In 1934, Viscount Lymington resigned as MP for Basingstoke, after becoming disillusioned with party politics. Nonetheless, he helped to ensure that his successor as Conservative candidate would be Drummond Wolff, a close political associate. Drummond Wolff was duly elected in the resulting by-election, but he held the seat for only a year, resigning ostensibly due to ill health, although in fact because he shared Lymington's lack of faith in democracy. Despite that, both men were involved in the selection of the next MP, Patrick Donner, who also had close links to the far right.

Despite being himself of Jewish ancestry, he was the great grandson of Joseph Wolff, Drummond Wolff was a notorious supporter of anti-Semitism and known for supporting the British Union of Fascists (BUF), he also donated £1,000 to the BUF. During his brief parliamentary career, he spoke in support of Oswald Mosley, along with other BUF-linked Tories such as Patrick Hannon, John Moore-Brabazon, Vice-Admiral E. A. Taylor and Thomas Moore. Correspondence between Drummond Wolff and an election agent also indicates that, before Donner's selection as Conservative candidate for the 1935 general election could be ratified, he had had to be interviewed by Oswald Mosley, with the Basingstoke Conservative Party as a whole closely linked to the BUF.

Such was the notoriety of Drummond Wolff with regards to his support for Nazism that he was used as an unofficial intermediary with Nazi Germany during the late 1930s. He was one of a number of leading British figures who regularly visited Germany in 1939 to hold talks with representatives of the Nazi government in an effort to avert war. Officially, such talks were not sanctioned by the government but in fact they were generally arranged with the support of Foreign Secretary Lord Halifax, his Undersecretary R.A. Butler, or even Neville Chamberlain himself. In 1939, Conservative Central Office operative and former MI5 spy, Sir Joseph Ball, acting on behalf of Chamberlain, facilitated four lengthy visits to Germany by Drummond Wolff, who undertook negotiations with Helmuth Wohlthat and Walther Hewel, political advisers to Hermann Göring and Adolf Hitler respectively, amongst others. In the last of those trips, Drummond Wolff even held talks with Göring himself. However, the meeting accomplished little because, by that point, Drummond Wolff was so pro-Nazi that he would agree with the Nazi view and simply present it to the government, rather than suggesting compromises. A leading industrialist, his visits to Germany were excused as being on behalf of the Council of Empire Industries Association, of which Drummond Wolff was a leading member. In 1934, he had become a member of the committee of the group which sought to promote trade between the countries within the British Commonwealth and the British Empire.

Although close to the BUF, Drummond Wolff did maintain some independence and, as war loomed, he joined Arthur Bryant in establishing Union and Reconstruction, a propaganda organisation that aimed to agitate against any proposed war with Germany. One of a number of similar movements active at the time, it had little influence outside far right circles. Drummond Wolff argued that war with Germany was being promoted by the press, which he claimed was controlled by Jews and leftists, as well as by war capitalists of the United States, and by the Soviet Union which, he argued, saw war as an opportunity for world revolution. He also argued that a war against Germany was not winnable, because the country could not be attacked by land or sea and so an air war would ensue, something that he felt the Luftwaffe would inevitably win. As war loomed, Drummond Wolff began to moderate his pro-Nazi stance and even published a paper in which he argued that, as a means of avoiding war, Britain could help foment a revolution within Germany, not as a means of removing Hitler, but rather of distracting him from international concerns and forcing him to focus internally. The Duke of Westminster, a staunch opponent of war with Germany, was impressed by Drummond Wolff's plan and read it to influential anti-war activists, but nothing came of it. The group became dormant soon after the outbreak of war, and Drummond Wolff withdrew from politics.

== Personal life ==
Drummond Wolff was the grandson of Sir Henry Drummond Wolff, himself also a Conservative MP. Drummond Wolff was married to the American socialite Margaret Fahnestock the daughter of investment banker Gibson Fahnestock and granddaughter of Harris C. Fahnestock whose sons were the founders of Fahnestock & Co.

== Bibliography ==
- Dorril, Stephen, Blackshirt: Sir Oswald Mosley and British Fascism, Penguin: 2007
- Newton, Scott, Profits of Peace: The Political Economy of Anglo-German Appeasement: The Political Economy of Anglo-German Appeasement, Oxford University Press: 1996
- Pugh, Martin, "Hurrah for the Blackshirts!": Fascists and Fascism in Britain Between the Wars, Pimlico: 2006

Parliament of the United Kingdom
| Preceded by Viscount Lymington | Member of Parliament for Basingstoke; 1934 – 1935 | Succeeded by Patrick Donner |
