= Earl of Portsmouth =

Earldom in the Peerage of Great Britain

Earldom of Portsmouth
- Wallop arms: Argent, a bend wavy sable Crest : A mermaid holding in the sinister hand a mirror and in the dexter a comb all proper supporters : On either side a chamois or wild goat sable
- Creation date: 11 April 1743
- Created by: George II
- Peerage: Peerage of Great Britain
- First holder: John Wallop, 1st Earl of Portsmouth
- Present holder: Quentin Wallop, 10th Earl of Portsmouth
- Heir apparent: Oliver Henry Rufus Wallop, Viscount Lymington
- Remainder to: 1st Earl's heirs male of the body lawfully begotten.
- Subsidiary titles: Viscount Lymington; Baron Wallop; Hereditary Bailiff of Burley, New Forest
- Seat: Farleigh Wallop
- Former seats: Hurtsbourne Park; Manor of Eggesford
- Motto: EN SUIVANT LA VERITÉ (In following the truth)

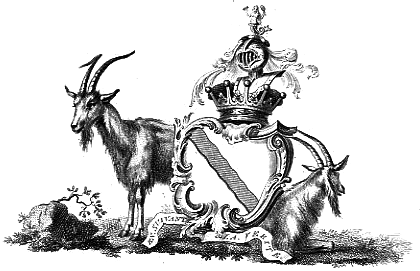
Arms of Wallop, Earls of Portsmouth. The supporters, Two chamois or wild goats sable, are here shown off duty; the crest is: A mermaid holding in the dexter hand a mirror in the other a comb all proper

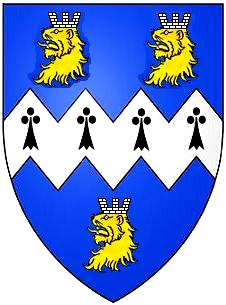
Arms of Fellowes of Eggesford, Devon: Azure, a fesse indented ermine between three lion's heads erased or murally crowned argent. Newton Wallop, later 4th Earl, adopted these arms by royal licence in 1794 together with the surname Fellows on inheriting the manor of Eggesford. The 5th Earl reverted to the ancient Wallop arms and name, but without royal licence

Earl of Portsmouth is a title in the Peerage of Great Britain. After the death of Louise de Kérouaille, Duchess of Portsmouth (c. 19 August 1673 - 14 November 1734), it was created in 1743 for John Wallop, 1st Viscount Lymington, who had previously represented Hampshire in the House of Commons. He had already been created Baron Wallop, of Farleigh Wallop in Hampshire in the County of Southampton, and Viscount Lymington, in 1720, also in the Peerage of Great Britain.

The second earl was the son of Catherine Conduitt, whose mother was Catherine Barton, half-niece of the eminent mathematical scientist Sir Isaac Newton. The earls of Portsmouth therefore are direct descendants of Isaac Newton's mother, and three of the earls have been named after Newton. The earls were in possession of a large trove of Newton's personal papers, until they were auctioned in 1936. Those documents are commonly known as the "Portsmouth Papers".

The third Earl declared himself King of Hampshire and his brother had him declared insane.

The fourth Earl represented Andover and Devonshire North in Parliament. In 1794, he assumed by Royal licence for himself and his issue the surname and arms of Fellowes only.

The fifth Earl resumed, without Royal licence, the family surname and arms of Wallop.

The sixth Earl represented Barnstaple in Parliament as a Liberal.

Oliver Henry Wallop, the eighth Earl, had moved from England to the United States, and been living the life of a rancher in Sheridan, Wyoming, at the time of the death of his older brother, the seventh Earl. Known as O.H. Wallop, he had served two terms a state representative in the Wyoming Legislature. He had become an American citizen in 1891, and was allowed to take his seat in the House of Lords only after renouncing American citizenship.

The ninth Earl sat as Conservative Member of Parliament for Basingstoke.

The current holder is Quentin Wallop, 10th Earl of Portsmouth, who succeeded in 1984, is the only son of Oliver Kintzing Wallop, Viscount Lymington (1923–1984).

The American politician Malcolm Wallop was a grandson of the 8th Earl.

The family seat is Farleigh House, near Basingstoke, Hampshire.

== Earls of Portsmouth (from 1743) ==
- John Wallop, 1st Earl of Portsmouth (1690–1762)
  - John Wallop, Viscount Lymington (1718–1749)
- John Wallop, 2nd Earl of Portsmouth (1742–1797)
- John Charles Wallop, 3rd Earl of Portsmouth (1767–1853)
- Newton Fellowes, 4th Earl of Portsmouth (1772–1854), brother of third Earl
- Isaac Newton Wallop, 5th Earl of Portsmouth (1825–1891)
- Newton Wallop, 6th Earl of Portsmouth (1856–1917)
- John Fellowes Wallop, 7th Earl of Portsmouth (1859–1925), brother of sixth Earl
- Oliver Henry Wallop, 8th Earl of Portsmouth (1861–1943), brother of sixth and seventh Earls
- Gerard Vernon Wallop, 9th Earl of Portsmouth (1898–1984)
  - Oliver Kintzing Wallop, Viscount Lymington (1923–1984)
- Quentin Gerard Carew Wallop, 10th Earl of Portsmouth (b. 1958)

The heir apparent is the present holder's son Oliver Henry Rufus Wallop, Viscount Lymington (b. 1981). In 2016, Viscount Lymington married Flora Pownall.

The heir apparent's heir apparent is his elder son, the Hon. Arthur Oliver Henry Wallop (born 2025).

== Also see ==
- Louise de Kérouaille, Duchess of Portsmouth (c. 19 August 1673 - 14 November 1734)
