= Lower Wield =

Village in Hampshire, England

Coordinates: 51.15765°N 1.09100°W

- Location within Hampshire
- OS grid reference: SU636402
- Civil parish: Wield
- District: East Hampshire
- Shire county: Hampshire
- Region: South East
- Country: England
- Sovereign state: United Kingdom
- Post town: Alresford
- Postcode district: SO24
- Police: Hampshire and Isle of Wight
- Fire: Hampshire and Isle of Wight
- Ambulance: South Central

Lower Wield is a village in the East Hampshire district of Hampshire, England. It is in the civil parish of Wield. It is 1.8 miles (2.9 km) west of the village of Bentworth, 5.2 miles (8.4 km) west of Alton. The nearest railway station is Alton, 5.2 miles (8.4 km) east of the village.

At one time, Lower Wield came under the large parish of Bentworth until its decline in the mid-19th century. Although today, Wield's parish borders the parish of Bentworth.

The village has one public house, The Yew Tree.
