= 1934 Basingstoke by-election =

UK parliamentary by-election

The 1934 Basingstoke by-election was a parliamentary by-election for the British House of Commons constituency of Basingstoke on 19 April 1934.

== Vacancy ==
The by-election was caused by the resignation of the sitting Conservative MP, Gerard Wallop. He resigned suddenly on 14 February 1934. He had been MP here since holding the seat in 1929.

== Election history ==
Basingstoke had been won by the Conservatives at every election since 1885 apart from 1923 when the Liberals won. The result at the last General election was as follows;

1931 general election: Basingstoke
Party	Candidate	Votes	%	±%
Conservative	Gerard Wallop	23,523	69.7	+19.3
Liberal	Frances Josephy	6,106	18.1	−17.3
Labour	C A Goatcher	4,124	12.2	−2.0
Majority		17,417	51.6	+36.6
Turnout		33,753	67.44	−6.8
Conservative hold		Swing		

== Candidates ==
- The local Conservatives selected 34-year-old Henry Drummond-Wolff as candidate to defend the seat. He was the grandson of former Conservative MP, Sir Henry Drummond-Wolff. He had contested the 1933 Rotherham by-election without success.
- The Liberal candidate from the last election, Frances Josephy had been selected as prospective candidate for Devizes, so the Liberals had to look for a new candidate. On 27 February they selected 25-year-old John Foot as candidate. He was a son of the Liberal MP Isaac Foot and a younger brother of the Liberal MP Dingle Foot. He was educated at Forres School, Swanage and then Bembridge School on the Isle of Wight. He went on to read jurisprudence at Balliol College, Oxford, where he was President of the Oxford Union in 1931, following in the steps of his elder brother Dingle (1928). After graduation he joined the family law firm. He was standing for parliament for the first time.
- The local Labour party selected year-old James William Barker as candidate.

== Campaign ==
Polling Day was set for 19 April 1934, some two months after the vacancy first became known. Nominations closed on 9 April 1934.

Foreign Affairs dominated the campaign, particularly the Conservative dominated National Government's isolationist approach.

The Conservative campaign leaned heavily on the support of their National Government partners. On 5 April, leading Liberal National MP, Ernest Brown, the Minister for Mines, spoke in support of Drummond Wolff. Liberal National Leader Sir John Simon, the Foreign Secretary sent a public letter of support to the Conservative candidate which called on Liberals to vote Conservative.

On the Eve of poll, the Liberal Party Leader, Sir Herbert Samuel visited the constituency and spoke at a public meeting in support of Foot.

== Result ==
Despite a large swing against the National Government, the Conservatives managed to hold onto the seat.

1934 Basingstoke by-election
Party	Candidate	Votes	%	±%
Conservative	Henry Drummond Wolff	16,147	53.7	−16.0
Liberal	John Foot	9,262	30.8	+12.7
Labour	James William Barker	4,663	15.5	+3.3
Majority		6,885	22.9	−28.7
Turnout		30,072	64.4	−3.0
Conservative hold		Swing	-14.4	

== Aftermath ==
A Peace Ballot was launched in 1934 to ascertain public support for the League of Nations and collective security. As a result, just before the 1935 general election, the National Government agreed to the Liberal policy of working through the League of Nations. Drummond-Wolff chose not to defend his seat at the following General Election. Foot stood here again. The result at the following General election;

General election 1935: Basingstoke
Party	Candidate	Votes	%	±%
Conservative	Patrick Donner	18,549	57.8	+4.1
Liberal	John Foot	10,317	32.2	+1.4
Labour	J.S. Whybrew	3,207	10.0	−5.5
Majority		8,232	25.7	+2.8
Turnout		32,073	67.4	+3.0
Conservative hold		Swing		

== See also ==
- Lists of United Kingdom by-elections
- United Kingdom by-election records
