= Wield =

Village and parish in Hampshire, England

Coordinates: 51°08′N 1°06′W

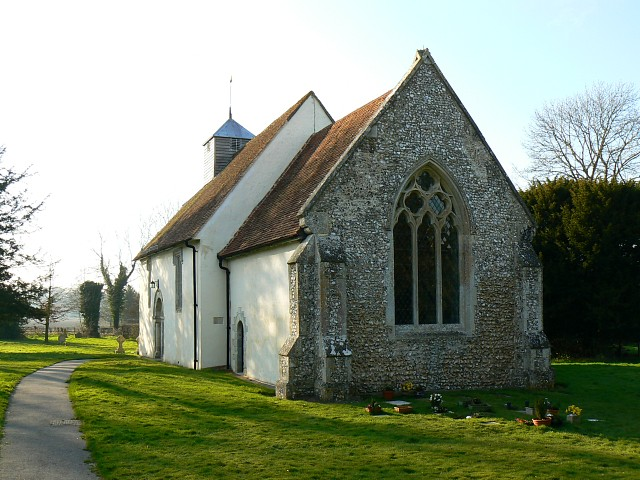
- St James's church, Upper Wield, Hampshire

- Location within Hampshire
- Area: 8.518 km^{2} (3.289 sq mi)
- Population: 237 (2021 census)
  - Density: 28/km^{2} (73/sq mi)
- Civil parish: Wield
- District: East Hampshire
- Shire county: Hampshire
- Region: South East
- Country: England
- Sovereign state: United Kingdom

Wield is a civil parish in the East Hampshire district, in the county of Hampshire, England. It includes two neighbouring villages, Upper Wield and Lower Wield. In 2021 the parish had a population of 237.

The parish council meets quarterly at the parish hall in Upper Wield.

Wield as a civil parish is separate from the church parish. The parish church, dedicated to St James, is also in Upper Wield. It is mainly Norman, and is a Grade I listed building.

== Notable people ==
William Wallop (c. 1553-1617), Member of the Parliament of England, justice of the peace, thrice mayor of Southampton.

== Gallery ==
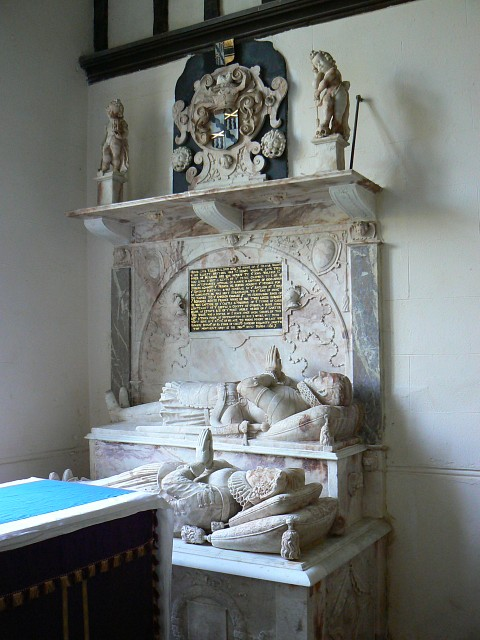
Memorial to William Waloppe esquire

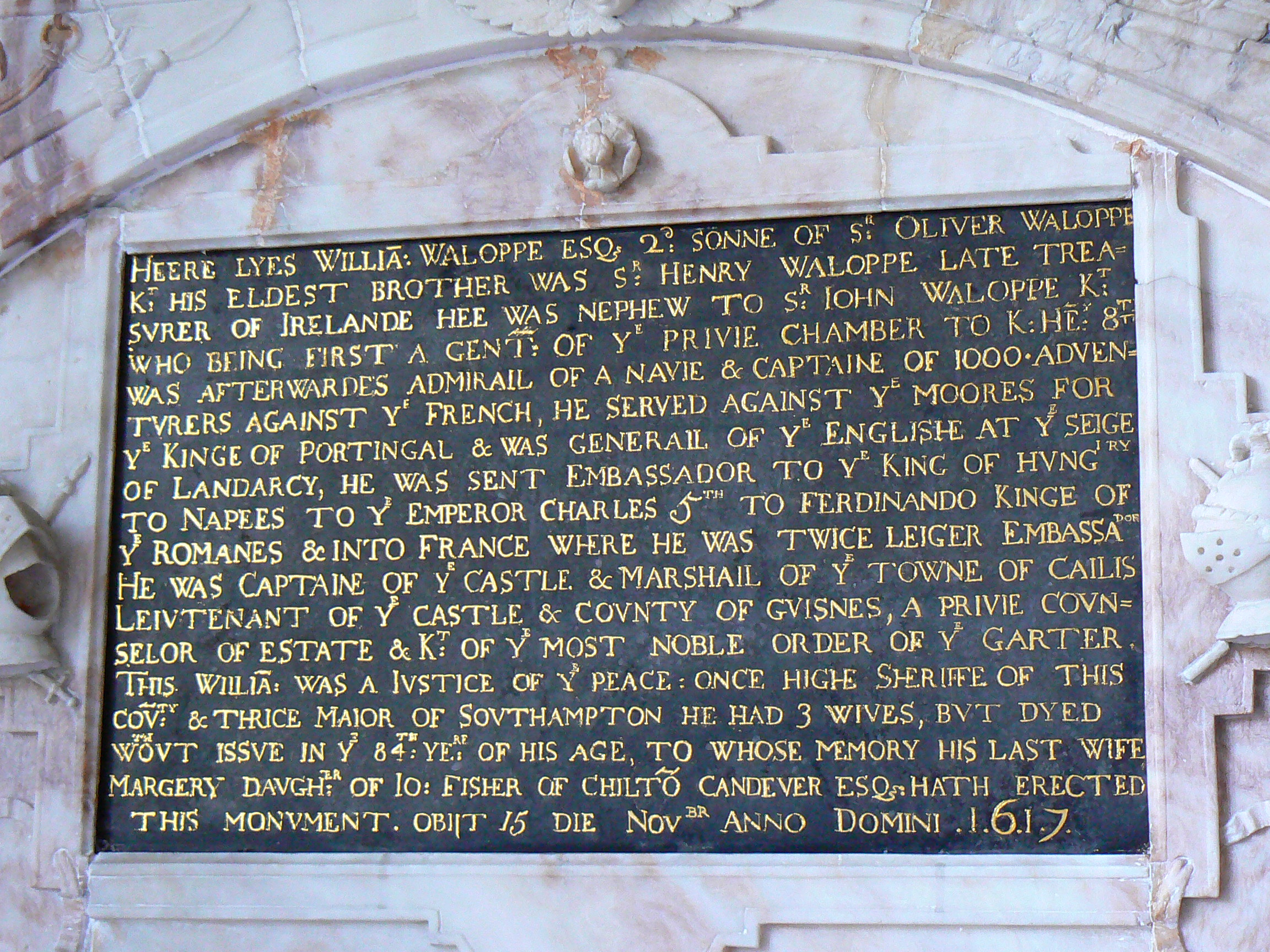
Memorial to William Waloppe esquire
