= English Array =

English Array was a British fascist group and offshoot of the English Mistery founded and led by Lord Lymington.

== Foundation ==
In 1930, the English Mistery was founded by William Sanderson. Sanderson was by all accounts a 'difficult' man to deal with, and by 1935 the Mistery was being divided into two factions, one loyal to Sanderson and another to Lymington. The breaking point occurred when Lymington's first marriage ended in divorce in 1936 on the grounds of unfaithfulness on his part and he promptly married his mistress. Sanderson felt that Lymington's behaviour was not proper for the "chief syndic" of the Mistery and asked him to resign. The majority of the members of the Mistery followed Lymington who founded the English Array in December 1936 while Sanderson remained the leader of a rump Mistery that soon faded into irrelevance. The ideology of the English Array was precisely the same as that of English Mistery, while the difference was that the new leader was Lymington.

The English Array used as its symbol a red rose set on the Saint George's Cross flag (the flag of England) along with elaborate titles as the English Array was led by marshals whose musters corresponded to the counties of England. As suggested by its name, the English Array identified with England instead of Britain and did not operate in the Celtic lands of Scotland, Wales and Northern Ireland. The British historian Martin Pugh wrote that the "English Array was Gothic in style and frankly reactionary in inspiration". Like the English Mistery, the English Array did not accept women as members. The English Array saw the end of the feudal system in England as the greatest disaster that ever befell the English people, and longed to restore a highly idealised vision of the Middle Ages with the English people united in deference to the king and the aristocracy. The British historian Richard Griffiths wrote that the leaders of the English Array took "... fanciful and faintly medieval titles. Lymington was Marshal of the Array. The Hon. Richard de Grey, brother of Lord Walsingham, was Lieutenant of the King Alfred Muster in Dorset. Sir Geoffrey Congreve, who owned about 3,000 acres in Staffordshire was Area Marshal for that county. A certain Richard Marker was Leader of the New Muster at Gittesham, East Devon. Captain R.J.M. Wilson was Stewart of the Fens". The membership of the English Array was almost entirely rural with the Array being very strong in East Anglia.

== Activities ==
The centre of the English Array was Farleigh Wallop, the estate of Lymington in the Hampshire countryside. The English Array maintained contacts with other groups such as the British Union of Fascists led by Sir Oswald Mosley to the Kinship in Husbandry led by Rolf Gardiner. The Conservative MP Reginald Dorman-Smith was one of the English Mistery members who left to join the English Array. Dorman-Smith joined the cabinet in January 1939 as minister of agriculture, which gave the English Array hopes that their vision would soon be realised. The English Array was a back-to-the-land movement and called for the deurbanisation of Britain. Alongside the calls for a rural society to led both politically and economically by the aristocracy was an ecologist message about preserving the environment and promoting organic farming. The clearest expression of the ideology of the English Array was the 1938 book Famine in England by Lymington, which contained praise for the concentration camps of Nazi Germany, the "white northern races of Europe" and the beauty of English countryside along with attacks on the "scum" and "aliens" in England and "international finance". Gardiner who like most of the other members of the English Mistery left in 1936 to join the English Array was very active in settling up "National Service Camps" designed to train the future elite of the English Array who would take over Britain once democracy collapsed. Like the English Mistery before it, the basic concept of the English Array was that the United Kingdom was heading towards a catastrophic collapse which would see the end of democracy with the king staging a self-coup to take power, and at which point the English Mistery/English Array would step forward to assist the royal dictatorship. A major theme of both the English Mistery and the English Array was that the Great Depression was only the first stage of the expected catastrophe while the widespread perception that both Ramsay MacDonald and Stanley Baldwin were ineffectual prime ministers was the second stage of the expected disaster.

The ideology of the English Array was very strongly influenced by the "blood-and-soil" ideas of the Völkisch movement in Germany. Like the völkisch activists in the Reich, the English Array linked race to the landscape with healthy landscapes equating healthy bodies and healthy races.. Lymington believed that the Industrial Revolution along with the accompanying urbanisation were disasters for Britain as it caused a "racial degeneration", which only be stopped by a return of the population to the rural areas. Lymington wrote: "The conviction that the healthy state of the soil is the foundation of human health as well of that of the crops and animals is one that does not need any explanation for the men of the English Array... If we serve our soil, we can bring back the fertility of the strong breeds that will people the Empire with the desired men and women who will hold it against tides of yellow men and brown". Lymington called for a protectionist policy designed to keep foreign agricultural products out of British markets while agriculture would be made the centre of the British economy via state subsidies and land banks. Lymington believed that the "international finance" (i.e. a codename for Jews) was intentionally starving British farms of capital, and that Britain could achieve agricultural self-sufficiency by settling up land banks that would provide the necessary capital to modernise farming. Like the English Mistery, the English Array was anti-Semitic and depicted Jews as "eternal foreigners" who could never be English under any conditions. The English Array did not accept Jews as members and likewise banned all non-white people from its ranks as Englishness was understood by the English Array to be Christian and white. The English Array believed that the English people were a race whose bloodlines needed to be protected from foreigners, which led for the group to be strongly anti-immigrant. As part of "back-to-the-land" ideology, members of the English Array were encouraged to move to rural areas and engage in organic farming. A major concern for the English Array was stopping the sale of pasteurised milk, which was seen as a deadly health threat to the English.

Lymington favoured an absolute monarchy for Britain as he stated that for the English Array: "We speak of our Sovereign Lord the King. The phrase enshrines the deepest political instinct we have. It is not a sentiment of wishfulness; it is the strength which binds us back to our ancestors and drives us forward to build the future with purpose from binding back. It has two sides, mystical and practical". The English Array was openly opposed to democracy and any man wanting to join the English Array had to take the following oath: "I have faith in the surviving stock of my own people. I have love for them and for the English soil from which I have sprung. I have hope that though the regeneration of that stock and its soil. I hate the system of democracy which is in effect a tyranny that dupes men by allowing them to agitate in Hyde Park while it refuses them the right to be responsible for their own family". The English Array believed in the traditional divine right of kings with the British monarchs as accountable only to God, and the English Array presented the monarchy in mystical terms as a semi-divine institution whose powers had been usurped by parliament. The group believed that the king was a "prisoner" of Parliament and the English Array attempted to infiltrate the court with the aim of freeing the king in order to restore his rightful powers.

The English Array supported the Nationalists in the Spanish Civil War and accepted at face value the claim that the botched military coup d'état of 18 July 1936 against the Second Spanish Republic was necessary to forestall a planned Communist coup. Lymington wrote: "About Spain it is only necessary to say that Franco's is not a military rebellion, but a popular uprising against great material odds to save Spain from a foreign planned Communist revolution". In its writings on European affairs, the English Array was very pro-Nazi and consistently portrayed the Third Reich in a positive light. In the Quarterly Gazette of the English Array for April 1938, Lymington praised the Anschluss and wrote "we must do what we can to save our country from being forced into a war which would mark the end of white civilisation". In the July 1938 edition of the Quarterly Gazette praised the fascist regimes in Italy and Germany as much superior to British democracy. The anonymous article wrote in the United Kingdom "the degenerate and morally deficient are free to propagate their bad stock, which becomes a charge on the rest of the community; the aliens are free to enter the country at the rate of one hundred and fifty per month and take many jobs which might go to British men and women while they are also free to destroy our culture and lower our health by miscegenation... in those countries [Italy and Germany] duty to the whole body politic comes before the selfish interests of any particular individual or group". The article ended by praising the Nazi regime for "constructive racial regeneration" of the German people. In September 1938, the English Array held its annual rally at Lymington's estate at Farleigh Wallop where Dorman-Smith and Gardiner both spoke. In his speech, Gardiner praised the Nazi regime for having "showed how hope can be given to a defeated and degenerate nation by sacrifice and singleness of mind working outside the ordinary bureaucratic standards; how the regeneration of Hitler's Germany was made possible beforehand by a few pioneers".

In the October 1938 edition of Quarterly Gazette, Lymington wrote about the Sudetenland crisis: "Few stopped to think that such a war would benefit no one, but the Jews and the international communists... The fault did not lie with those whose standards were so warped that they believed alliance with the Czechs and the Bolsheviks against a regenerate Germany was right, but with us who have so far failed to carry regenerate values through the country". The same issue contained an anonymous article that read: "Ostensibly, we were to fight to save a small nation from German aggression. In our ignorance we did not or could not realise that we were to use force to prevent Germans using force to finish, once and for all, a miserable people using force to oppress and hold within their boundaries better people than themselves. Never once did we enquire, who are these Czechs? If we had, we would have realised that we proposed to sacrifice the best for the worst in Europe. The Czechs are in fact the inferiority-complex whites of Europe. Their fellow Slavs, the Serbians, have called them the white Jews of Europe... They have been a centre for Communist intrigue and promise after promise made by Benes, a prominent member of the Grand Orient, has been broken. It is symbolical that Prague is a moneylenders' centre... It was the perfect way to overthrow everything decent in Europe and leave a few master moneylenders, orientals, clever degenerates and a mass of subhuman beings in control of Europe".

== Dissolution ==
In August 1939 at the height of the Danzig crisis, Lymington sent out a message to the English Array reading "should there be a war, it must be treated as an interval in full Array activities". In October 1939 edition of the Array's journal The New Pioneer, Lymington complained about the "fratricide" in Europe which only served the Soviet Union. The marked similarity of ideas of the English Array to the National Socialists in Germany was much noted at the time, and led Lymington to dissolve the English Array in 1940 as he feared he would be interned as a fascist.

== Books and articles ==
- Dietz, Bernhard (2018). Neo-Tories The Revolt of British Conservatives Against Democracy and Political Modernity (1929-1939). London: Bloomsbury Publishing. ISBN 9781472570031.
- Griffiths, Richard (1980). Fellow Travellers of the Right British Enthusiasts for Nazi Germany, 1933-9. Oxford: Oxford University Press. ISBN 0094634602.
- Pugh, Martin (2013). Hurrah For The Blackshirts! Fascists and Fascism in Britain Between the Wars. New York: Random House. ISBN 9781448162871.
- Stone, Daniel (June 2003). "The English Mistery, the BUF, and the Dilemmas of British Fascism". The Journal of Modern History. 75 (2): 336–358.
