= Upper Wield =

Village in Hampshire, England

Coordinates: 51°08′41″N 1°06′06″W

- Location within Hampshire
- OS grid reference: SU629387
- Civil parish: Wield
- District: East Hampshire
- Shire county: Hampshire
- Region: South East
- Country: England
- Sovereign state: United Kingdom
- Post town: Alresford
- Postcode district: SO24
- Police: Hampshire and Isle of Wight
- Fire: Hampshire and Isle of Wight
- Ambulance: South Central
- UK Parliament: East Hampshire

Upper Wield is a village in the East Hampshire district of Hampshire, England. It is in the civil parish of Wield. It is 5.5 miles (8.9 km) west of Alton.

The nearest railway station is the restored Medstead & Four Marks station on the Watercress Line, trains from which connect with the nearest national rail station 5.5 miles (8.9 km) to the east, at Alton.

In January 2014 a whirl-wind blew away three farm buildings at Blackmoor Game
