= Janet Cree =

British painter

Janet Katherine Cree (1910 –1992) was a British painter specializing in egg tempera.

The daughter of Arthur Thomas Crawford "Dick" Cree, a barrister, and Ivy Williams, an artist, she was born in London. Her father was killed at Ypres in May 1915 while serving with the Durham Light Infantry. Cree attended the Byam Shaw School of Art from 1928 to 1933. Her 1932 work The Oriental Portrait was acquired by the Tate gallery. She was commissioned by Bishop George Bell of Chicester to paint murals for churches. She married the barrister John Platts-Mills in 1936. Cree stopped painting during the late 1930s to raise her family, only resuming her art career in 1967. She exhibited her work in various galleries in London and Sussex, also showing regularly with the Royal Academy. Cree and her husband were friends of the politician Henry Devenish Harben. They were interviewed about him in December 1976 by the historian, Brian Harrison, as part of his Suffrage Interviews project, titled Oral evidence on the suffragette and suffragist movements: the Brian Harrison interviews. Cree returned to New Zealand with her husband in 1981. Cree died in 1992 at the age of 82 from complications after undergoing heart surgery.
