= Henry William John Edwards =

Welsh author (1910–1991)

Henry William John Edwards (1910–1991) was a Welsh author. From a nonconformist background, he converted to Catholicism at the beginning of World War II. In later life he was a Welsh Nationalist associated with Plaid Cymru. He wrote that "The paradox is that the conservative trait has the effect of conserving radical forces."

== Life ==
Edwards was born into a Welsh family in London. He was educated at Mercers' School and the University of Oxford. He lived in Wales from age 19.

Edwards was from a Quaker family background. In 1938 he was described as a Christian and former Communist. Around that time, he had associations with the British Union of Fascists, attending a meeting hosted by Alexander Raven Thomson, and contributing to the British Union Quarterly. Of his 1942 conversion to Catholicism, while in the army, he wrote in 1948 that:

When I became a Catholic I was in fact rather embarrassed by those Quakers who gave me credit for an interest in the spiritual life that I did not possess. I did not, as they believed, become a Catholic in a mysterious leap from pole to pole, nor because I saw a similarity in the writings of Isaac Penington and of St John of the Cross. I became a Catholic simply because I was afraid of going to hell.

In later life Edwards was a supporter of Traditionalist Catholicism, opposed to Vatican II. He worked as a journalist and accountant. His wife was from the Rhondda Valley, and he settled in Trealaw in 1947.

== Works ==
- The Radical Tory: Disraeli's Political Development Illustrated from His Original Writings and Speeches (1937), editor
- Young England (1938)
- The Good Patch (1938)
- What is Welsh Nationalism? (1954)
- Sons of the Romans: The Tory as Nationalist (1975)
