= Henry Wallop =

English statesman

Sir Henry Wallop (c. 1540 – 14 April 1599) was an English statesman.

== Biography ==
Henry Wallop was the eldest son of Sir Oliver Wallop (d. 1566) of Farleigh Wallop in Hampshire. His younger brother William Wallop was thrice mayor of Southampton.

Due to primogeniture, he inherited the estates of his father and of his uncle, Sir John Wallop. He was knighted in 1569 and was chosen member of parliament for Southampton in 1572. His connection with Ireland, began in 1579, when he was appointed vice-treasurer of that country. This position was a very thankless and difficult one and Wallop appears to have undertaken it unwillingly.

However, Sir Henry reached Dublin and was soon immersed in the troubles caused by the rebellion of Gerald FitzGerald, 15th Earl of Desmond, finding, in his own words, it was "easier to talk at home of Irish wars than to be in them". In July 1582, he and Adam Loftus, archbishop of Dublin, were appointed Lord Justices for Ireland. They were responsible for the government of Ireland for the following two years and both took a leading part in the arrest, torture, and execution of Dermot O'Hurley, the Roman Catholic Archbishop of Cashel. Soon afterwards, they were succeeded by Sir John Perrot.

Sir Henry continued to fill the office of vice-treasurer, and at Enniscorthy, where he had secured a lease of lands, he set up a colony of Englishmen and opened up a trade with Madeira. As a member of the Irish council, he quarrelled with Perrot. From 1589 to 1595, he was in England, entertaining the queen at Farleigh Wallop in 1591. Having returned to Ireland, he was sent to Dundalk to attempt to make peace with Hugh O'Neill, earl of Tyrone, but this proved a vain errand. At length, after many entreaties, he was allowed to resign the treasurership, but before he could arrange to leave Ireland he died.

Wallop's eldest son, Sir Henry Wallop (1568–1642), who acted as his father's deputy in Ireland, left an only son, Robert Wallop (1601–1667).

A member of parliament for nearly 40 years, and a supporter of the parliamentary party during the English Civil War, Robert was one of the judges of Charles I, although he did not sign the death warrant. He was active under the Commonwealth, being a member of nearly all the councils of state. At the Restoration, he was deprived of his estates and imprisoned, dying in the Tower of London on 19 November 1667. Robert's son Henry (d. 1673) was the grandfather of John Wallop, 1st Earl of Portsmouth.
