= John Platts-Mills =

British barrister (1906–2001)

John Faithful Fortescue Platts-Mills, QC (4 October 1906 – 26 October 2001) was a British barrister and left-wing politician. He was the Labour Party Member of Parliament for Finsbury from 1945 to 1948, when he was expelled from the party effectively for his pro-Soviet sympathies. He remained an MP until 1950, and then returned to his legal career.

== Early life and career ==
He was born in Wellington, New Zealand in 1906 to John Mills, a prosperous businessman, and Daisy Platts, a doctor. Platts-Mills was educated at Ocean Bay School, Port Underwood, Marlborough, from 1917 to 1918, and at Nelson College from 1919 to 1924. He graduated with a first-class honours degree in law from Victoria University College in Wellington where he had been an excellent sportsman in track athletics, boxing and as a rower. In 1929, he won a Rhodes Scholarship to Balliol College, Oxford.

After graduating from Oxford University, Platts-Mills was called to the Bar from the Inner Temple in 1932, then worked as a barrister in London. He belonged to the ultra-conservative English Mistery group and his flat at 2, Paper Buildings, Inner Temple, was the Mistery's address and meeting place for a time.

== 1935 to 1945 ==
The proposed Hoare–Laval Pact permanently altered his political outlook and in 1936 he joined the Labour Party. Mills was a friend of Olympic gold medallist and anti-fascist Lewis Clive, who died fighting against Nationalist forces in 1938 during the Spanish Civil War. Platts-Mills was himself opposed to the Labour Party's policy of non-intervention. In 1939 he took part as secretary in hearings set up by John Gollan of the British Youth Peace Assembly, a youth campaign having communist backing, with Arthur Comyns Carr as president, and Hyman Berger.

On the outbreak of the Second World War, he joined the Royal Air Force and was commissioned as pilot officer in June 1940. However, he was asked to leave, and it was suspected that this was due to his communist sympathies. After the Soviet Union was invaded by Germany, the military was more willing to accept communists. According to Platts-Mills' own account, Sir Stafford Cripps introduced him to prime minister Winston Churchill, who told him: "I have been teaching the British since 1918 that the Russians eat their young. For the sake of the war effort, take as much money as you need and change that public perception of them." During the later part of the war, Platts-Mills volunteered to work as a Bevin boy in the coal mines. Then 38, he worked in the mines for 18 months.

== In politics ==
Platts-Mills was encouraged to become a Labour Member of Parliament (MP) by Frank Soskice, and in 1944 was added to a list of potential candidates. In 1945 V. K. Krishna Menon asked him to represent Indian interest in independence, and suggested Finsbury as a suitable seat. At the 1945 general election he was elected as its MP. In the Commons, Platts-Mills emerged as one of a small number of MPs with pro-Soviet sympathies. He told Simon Hattenstone of The Guardian in 2001, not long before he died: "I was a good constituency chap."

=== Nenni telegram ===
In 1948 Platts-Mills ceased to be a Labour MP, after an episode of factional strife, in which he was responsible for a telegram of support sent to the Italian socialist leader Pietro Nenni in April of that year. He had helped organise a petition in support of Nenni and the Italian Socialist Party in its campaign for the 1948 Italian general election. The idea was up in the air at the time, and Maurice Orbach found about a dozen Labour MPs who supported it. Platts-Mills sent off the telegram, with Hyman Berger who was now his parliamentary clerical assistant, on the evening of 16 April, despite a warning earlier that day from Geoffrey Bing of potential trouble with the Labour whips.

The telegram was supported by 36 further Labour MPs, rather than literally being signed by them. They made up the "Nenni telegram" group. It overlapped with the "Keep Left" group taking their name from a 1947 pamphlet, with some sympathies in geopolitics for the USSR. Three of the supporters—William Dobbie, Harold Lever, and Charles Royle—were not identified with the Labour left.

The position adopted by the Nenni supporters was contentious, as his party was in alliance with the Italian Communist Party in a popular front, and the Labour Party's official backing was for the Partito Socialista Democratico Italiano and Giuseppe Saragat, in the non-communist aligned Socialist Unity alliance. According to Platts-Mills, Labour had in 1944 recognised the continuity of Nenni's party with the pre-Mussolini Italian socialists; and the endorsement was repudiated after the telegram was sent by Hector McNeil and Morgan Phillips, in favour of Saragat's group. Edmond writes the telegram was provocative and the furore predictable, that the switch to support for Saragat was under consideration at the time, and that Ernest Bevin came under pressure from George Marshall to expel Platts-Mills, a critic of American foreign policy.

Many of the MPs retracted their support when asked to do so, and in the end almost all came to an accommodation with the Labour Party managers. Platts-Mills was an exception. He was already under investigation by the Party's National Executive Committee and was expelled from the Labour Party in April 1948 after he submitted a statement which was found unacceptable.

=== Aftermath ===
The expulsion of Platts-Mills led to the formation in 1949 of the Labour Independent Group which gained support from four other Soviet-sympathising ex-Labour MPs: Konni Zilliacus, D. N. Pritt, Geoffrey Bing and William Warbey.

Platts-Mills stood as an Independent Labour candidate in the new Shoreditch and Finsbury constituency in the 1950 general election but came third. He was opposed to NATO and claimed that the United States had too much power in Europe. He was readmitted to the Labour Party in 1969 after previous attempts in 1964 and 1966 were unsuccessful.

== Later legal career ==
He returned to his legal career and was made a Queen's Counsel (QC) in 1964. "A master of courtroom theatre.. [whose] clashes with the Bench entered into legal legend", Platts-Mills was defence counsel to many clients, including the Great Train Robbers at their appeal and Ronnie Kray. Of the Kray Twins, who were found guilty of the murders of George Cornell and Jack McVitie in 1969, Platt-Mills later said: "I genuinely believed they were not guilty".

Platts-Mills was said to have encouraged Billy Strachan, a fellow communist activist and one of the pioneers of black civil rights in Britain, to study law. Strachan then went onto be elected the President of Inner London Justices' Clerks' Society, and became an expert in laws regarding adoption, marriage, and drink-driving.

== Personal life ==
In 1936, he married artist Janet Cree. He was the father of a forester, Tim Platts-Mills; a Lonrho director, Jonathan Platts-Mills; Thomas Platts-Mills; film director Barney Platts-Mills, a wood sculptor, Benjamin Platts-Mills, and Mark Platts-Mills QC.

Platts-Mills was a friend of the politician, Henry Devenish Harben, who he met through the World Peace Council in the late 1940s. Platts-Mills was interviewed about Harben, in December 1976, by the historian, Brian Harrison, as part of his Suffrage Interviews project, titled Oral evidence on the suffragette and suffragist movements: the Brian Harrison interviews.

His wife died in 1992. Platts-Mills himself died on 26 October 2001.

== See also ==
- Apollo University Lodge
- Orwell's list

== Notes ==
Parliament of the United Kingdom
| Preceded by George Savile Woods | Member of Parliament for Finsbury; 1945–1950 | constituency abolished |
