= Gerard Wallop, 9th Earl of Portsmouth =

British landowner and pro-Axis fascist politician

The Right Honourable The Earl of Portsmouth DL
- Earl of Portsmouth
- Tenure: 10 February 1943 – 28 September 1984
- Predecessor: Oliver Wallop, 8th Earl of Portsmouth
- Successor: Quentin Wallop, 10th Earl of Portsmouth
- Other titles: 9th Earl of Portsmouth; 9th Viscount Lymington; 9th Baron Wallop; Hereditary Bailiff of Burley, New Forset
- Born: Gerard Vernon Wallop; 16 May 1898; Chicago, Illinois, U.S.
- Died: 28 September 1984 (aged 86); Newbury, England
- Residence: Sheridan, Wyoming (childhood); Farleigh Wallop, Hampshire, England (later life)
- Spouses: Mary Lawrence Post (m. 1920) Bridget Cory Croban (m. 1936)
- Issue: Oliver Kintzing Wallop, Viscount Lymington; Lady Anne Camilla Evelyn Wallop; Lady Phillipa Wallop; Lady Jane Wallop; Hon. Nicholas Wallop
- Parents: Oliver Wallop, 8th Earl of Portsmouth; Marguerite Walker
- Military career
- Allegiance: United Kingdom
- Branch: British Army
- Service years: 19 January 1917 - c. 11 November 1918
- Rank: Second lieutenant (probationary, temporarily; 19 January 1917 – 19 July 1918); Lieutenant (temporarily; 19 July 1918 - c. 11 November 1918)
- Units: 2nd Regiment of Life Guards (19 January 1917 – 10 May 1918); Guards Machine Gun Regiment (10 May 1918 - c. 11 November 1918)

Gerard Vernon Wallop, 9th Earl of Portsmouth (16 May 1898 – 28 September 1984), styled Viscount Lymington from 1925 until 1943, was an American-born British peer, landowner, writer on agriculture, Conservative member of parliament for Basingstoke from 1929 to 1934, pro-Axis politician, and Minister of Agriculture in the government of Kenya from 1957 to 1960.

== Early life ==
Gerard Wallop was born in Chicago, the eldest son of Oliver Henry Wallop and Marguerite Walker. His father moved to Wyoming, where he was a rancher and served in the Wyoming State Legislature. After the deaths of his father's two older brothers without sons, his father succeeded as Earl of Portsmouth, and renounced his United States citizenship to take his seat in the House of Lords.

Gerard Wallop was brought up near Sheridan, Wyoming, in the United States, where his parents lived, but was educated in England, at Farnborough, and at Winchester College. On 19 January 1917, during the First World War, Wallop was commissioned as a temporary second lieutenant (probationary) into the Reserve Regiment, 2nd Life Guards , and on 10 May 1918 he transferred to the Guards Machine Gun Regiment in which he was commissioned as a temporary lieutenant on 19 July 1918.

After the war he continued his education at Balliol College, Oxford, then farmed on the family estate at Farleigh Wallop in Hampshire.

== Conservative Party politics ==
Lord Lymington was Conservative member of parliament for the Basingstoke constituency from 1929 to 1934. He stepped down and caused a by-election in March 1934 (Henry Maxence Cavendish Drummond Wolff was elected).

In 1930, Lymington attracted media attention with a speech attacking the Conservative leader Stanley Baldwin as "a scheming old bladder of stale wind", saying the Conservatives needed a new leader immediately. As a result, Lymington was contacted by William Sanderson to ask him to join the English Mistery. Lymington described Sanderson as someone "utterly" dedicated to the English Mistery while being something of a "charlatan" with his talk of the mystical "lost secrets" of the English that only he knew. However, Sanderson sought to flatter Lymington, describing himself as a "Genghis Khan" who would sweep away all opposition and saying that if Lymington joined the English Mistery his name would be remembered in England 10,000 years into the future. In September 1930 Lymington joined the English Mistery, a mystical "back-to-the-land" movement, that sought to find the "lost secrets" of the English. They favoured a return to the Middle Ages, supporting deindustrialisation, the revival of the guild system, organic farming, and rule by the aristocracy. Alongside the return of feudalism and absolute monarchy, the English Mistery's ideology contained virulent racism, wanting to protect the English "race" from "inferior races". In 1933, William Sanderson, the leader of the English Mistery proposed Lymington as the future "Lord Protector" of Britain.

Like much of the British aristocracy at the time, Lymington wanted to recreate a version of the feudal system, which led him to own a lavish estate in the "White Highlands" of Kenya. In Kenya, Lymington treated his black African workers very much like serfs while he behaved like a feudal lord. Lymington was not unique in seeking to live a modern version of feudalism in Africa as it was common for members of the aristocracy in the interwar period to settle in either Southern Rhodesia (modern Zimbabwe) or Kenya to live out their fantasies of being feudal lords. Nor was Lymington unique in rejecting democracy. The establishment of universal suffrage which was achieved in stages over the 19th and 20th centuries along the curtailment of the power of the House of Lords led many aristocrats to complain about their loss of political power, which led for successive governments in Westminster to be more concerned about the interests of ordinary farmers instead of the land-owning nobility. The policy of free trade which kept food prices low was opposed by the land-owning aristocracy who had trouble competing with foreign farmers, and much of the nobility wanted a return to high agricultural tariffs. However, the policy of cheap food via free trade was popular with urban voters who had made up 90% of the electorate by the 1920s, and successive governments were not prepared to risk defeat in the next general election solely for the sake of keeping the landed estates of the aristocracy profitable. The British historian Martin Pugh noted it was no accident that every single aristocrat who owned an estate in Rhodesia or Kenya in the interwar period was active in far right-wing groups that sought to end democracy in the United Kingdom as all of the aristocrats who lived out their feudal fantasies in Africa all wanted to return to the political system where the aristocracy held political power again.

A key moment in the radicalisation of the aristocracy occurred in 1923 when Andrew Bonar Law resigned as prime minister. The Foreign Secretary, Lord Curzon, who had been widely expected to succeed Bonar Law, lost out to the middle-class Chancellor of the Exchequer Stanley Baldwin under the grounds that the prime minister should sit in the House of Commons instead of the House of Lords and that Baldwin had the greater public appeal. Baldwin's upset victory over Curzon was considered especially shocking at the time, as Curzon was widely felt to be better qualified to be Prime Minister, and was widely seen as the symbolic moment when the Conservative Party became the party of the middle class. Afterwards, there had been a sustained campaign by various peers to restore the power to veto bills passed by the House of Commons that the House of Lords had lost in 1911, which Baldwin resisted under the grounds that it would energise the Labour Party which was not well represented in the House of Lords and cost the Conservatives votes in the next general election. By the late 1920s, much of the aristocracy was in a resentful and angry mood, with the feeling being that democracy did not allow them what they saw as their rightful place as the political and economic elite. Lymington was attracted to the English Mistery precisely because it promised to restore the feudal society that was his ideal. Lymington stated in 1965 about his role in the English Mistery: "We did not regard ourselves as Herrenvolk but we wanted our revival to be Anglo-Saxon in the sense that Alfred the Great was Anglo-Saxon". Lymington wrote often for The English Review, a Conservative journal intended in the words of its editor from 1931 onward, Douglas Jerrold, to be "a platform for real Toryism as opposed to the plutocratic Conservatism represented by the official party under Mr. Baldwin's uninspiring leadership".

At this point he was in the India Defence League, an imperialist group of Conservatives around Winston Churchill, and undertook a research mission in India for them. Lymington became increasingly frustrated with the National Government founded in 1931, which he called "a morass of compromise" which was useless in the face of the Great Depression. Lymington visited several of the areas worse hit by the Great Depression, which he wrote left him "a sadder and more inwardly knowing man". He was especially concerned about the decline in British agriculture, which he called "the core of our existence". He often complained that British farmers were unable to compete with cheap food imported from abroad while he also spoke about soil erosion as he stated the soil of England itself was being "leeched of its fertility" because of reckless farming methods that put short-time yields ahead of the long-term preservation of the soil. He attended the second Convegno Volta in 1932, with Christopher Dawson, Lord Rennell of Rodd, Charles Petrie and Paul Einzig making up the British representatives. It was on the theme L'Europa.

In particular, Lymington was opposed to the Government of India Act that would have devolved much power to the Indians, which was understood as the first step towards ending the Raj, which Baldwin had supported. Under the Government of India Act, ultimate power would rest with the Viceroy appointed by London, but the rule of the Indian provinces by Governors appointed by the Viceroy would end with the people of the provinces electing their own chief ministers. In several speeches, Lymington condemned the Government of India Act as something close to treason, and warned that it was highly dangerous to allow the Indians to elect their own provincial governments. In one of his first anti-democratic speeches, Lymington argued that absolute monarchies of the princely states with ruled over by puppet maharajas and rajas in the case of Hindu princes or nawabs and nizams in the case of Muslim princes, were the natural form of government in India and that democracy would never work in India. Lymington took his praise for the princely states a step further than even Churchill had gone, and argued that absolute monarchies of the princely states was the best government not only for India, but also for the United Kingdom as well. In an article condemning the Government of India Act, Lymington wrote that the various maharajas and nawabs of the princely states were "not only the keystone of our Empire in India, but of the upmost importance for the recreation of English Kinship which remains a tradition in the heart of Englishmen, but which has been abandoned in practice by the English government".

His exit from party politics was apparently caused by a measure of disillusion, and frustrated ambition. In his resignation speech on 24 March 1934, he stated he was leaving the House of Commons because he was "unable any longer to breath the polluted atmosphere of the National Government". He stated he was appalled by the decline of agriculture and felt the "same frustration over rearmament". He stated he was leaving the House "to devote my energies and to play such a part as I am able in arousing our people to the necessities of national defence before it is too late and above all to help in trying to re-establish English character and tradition and in recreating local leadership". In a letter he wrote to The Saturday Review, Lymington wrote he had resigned because: "It has become clear that to be uncompromising on principles whether on India, defence or home politics is to be unable to adapt oneself to this party". In a practical sense, Lymington's attacks on Baldwin's leadership ensured he would never be allowed to enter the cabinet as long as Baldwin was the Conservative leader, and as the career as a backbencher was not appealing, Lymington decided to resign.

This was especially the case because Lymington's first act after resigning was to make a six-week visit to India where he set about trying to undermine the Government of India Act by trying to persuade many of the rulers of the princely states to reject it. For the Government of India Act to come into effect, all of the rulers of princely states would have to give their asset, which was felt to be a mere formality. Every prince of the princely state had a British resident attached to his court whose "advice" the prince had to always accept or risk being deposed. Generally speaking, as long as the rulers of 560 or so princely states were allowed to do whatever they wanted in their states as long as they followed the "advice" of the Resident. Lymington knew that the rulers of the princely states did not want the Raj to end as an independent Indian government would not allow them to rule their states as absolute monarchs as the Raj did. During his visit to India, Lymington met as many of the rulers of the princely states as possible, and was able to have 80% of the princes sign a letter of protest he had written stating their opposition to the Government of India Act. The very autocratic system that Lymington sought to defend in India proved to be his undoing. The Viceroy, Lord Willingdon, told the Indian princes to give their asset to the Government of India Act or risk being deposed in favour of another of prince who would, and ultimately all of the rulers of the princely states duly gave their asset to the Government of India Act. When Lymington accused Lord Willingdon of pressuring the princely states to give their asset, Baldwin threatened to sue for libel as he denied that his government was bullying the princes to support the Government of India Act. Had Lymington remained as an MP, he might had been expelled from the Conservative Party for his attempts to undermine government policy in India.

Lymington was still influential in Hampshire after his resignation. His chosen successor, Henry Maxence Cavendish Drummond Wolff, won the 1934 Basingstoke by-election to replace him. In the 1935 general election, Drummond Wolff chose not to stand, and another candidate chosen by Lymington, Patrick Donner, won the seat of Basingstoke. Both Drummond Wolff and Donner were involved in various far-right causes.

== Newton papers ==
In 1936, he sent for auction at Sotheby's the major collection of unpublished papers of Isaac Newton, known as the Portsmouth Papers. These had been in the family for around two centuries, since an earlier Viscount Lymington had married Newton's great-niece.

The sale was the occasion on which Newton's religious and alchemical interests became generally known. Broken into a large number of separate lots, running into several hundred, they became dispersed. John Maynard Keynes purchased many significant lots. Theological works were bought in large numbers by Abraham Yahuda. Another purchaser was Emmanuel Fabius, a dealer in Paris.

== Right-wing groups ==
Wallop was a member of and important influence on the English Mistery, a society promoted by William Sanderson and founded in 1929 or 1930. This was a conservative group, with views in tune with his own monarchist and ruralist opinions. Lymington's use of Parliamentary questions has been blamed for British government reluctance to admit refugees. Lymington was violently opposed to Britain accepting Jewish refugees from Germany, writing in a letter in 1936 that he was opposed to accepting German Jewish refugees who "had proved themselves unworthy subjects of Germany", going on to write that Britain was being "overrun with the unwanted and unworthy of the ghettoes and bazaars of most of Europe and a good deal of Asia". Lymington wrote that if the Archbishop of Canterbury was really concerned about human suffering, he should "interested himself in European Christians in Spain, Russia and other countries including our own".

A split in the Mistery left Wallop leading a successor, the English Array. It was active from 1936 to the early months of World War II, and advocated "back to the land". Lymington met several times with Sir Oswald Mosley to discuss an alliance between the English Array and the British Union of Fascists. Lymington was willing to work with Mosley, but did not want to see the English Array absorbed into the BUF.

Lymington wrote in one of his pamphlets for English Array: "The conviction that the healthy state of the soil is the foundation of human health as well of that of the crops and animals is one that does not need any explanation for the men of the English Array...If we serve our soil, we can bring back the fertility of the strong breeds that will people the Empire with the desired men and women who will hold it against tides of yellow men and brown". Its membership included A. K. Chesterton, J. F. C. Fuller, Rolf Gardiner, Richard de Grey, Hardwicke Holderness, Anthony Ludovici, John de Rutzen, and Reginald Dorman-Smith. It has been described as "more specifically pro-Nazi" than the Mistery; Famine in England (1938) by Lymington was an agricultural manifesto, but traded on racial overtones of urban immigration.

Famine in England was concerned with the "aliens" and "scum" said to be settling in British cities along with a sustained attack on "international finance" together with panegyrics for the beauty of the English countryside, the "great white northern races of Europe" and the concentration camps of Nazi Germany. Most of Famine in England was concerned about problems with British agriculture, but there was also several chapters devoted to the "scum of subhuman population" in Britain who were "the willing tools of the communist, since revolution means an opportunity to gratify their lusts". Lymington that some of the "scum of subhuman population" were "the dregs of English stock", but he wrote most of the "subhumans" were immigrants. Lymington complained that Britain was accepting far too many "subhuman" immigrants who had "one by one they have 'muscled in' on the Englishman's livelihood till they have everywhere in key positions. With them has come corruption and disrespect for the ancient decencies...This then, is the spawning-ground for panic, looting, revolution and wholesale bloodshed". Lymington suggested Nazi Germany as a model as he praised the "new spiritual awakening of Germany". Lyminton wrote "the happy ones" were people who had "a sane respect for the permanent things around them. They have a family feeling and a racial feeling and a determination to guard their culture". Lymington wrote: "Our northern stock has been continually weakened-first in battle for two thousand years and later by trade, which gave the worse stocks, the people of the ghettoes and bazaar and the Mediterranean types, their opportunity to flourish at the expense of the northern races". Lymington wrote it would be "suicidal" to go to war against Germany again, but warned it was possible because of "the endless propaganda directed in a sinister way against selected dictatorships in Europe". Lymington concluded: "We must therefore become strong, through agriculture and rearmament. Then we may learn how to enjoy peace. The average Englishmen would like to see a prosperous, healthy and strong Germany".

In the Quarterly Gazette of the English Array for April 1938, Lymington praised the Anschluss and wrote "we must do what we can to save our country from being forced into a war which would mark the end of white civilisation". He edited New Pioneer magazine from 1938 to 1940, collaborating with John Warburton Beckett and A. K. Chesterton. The gathering European war saw him found the British Council Against European Commitments in 1938, with William Joyce. Lymington founded the British Council Against European Commitments during the Sudetenland crisis which pushed the United Kingdom to the brink of war with the Reich. In his pamphlet published in September 1938 Should Britain Fight? The British Position and Some Facts on the Sudeten Problem, Lymington wrote: "war between ourselves and Germany, with a final victory for ourselves, can only mean Bolshevism in both countries, and the loss of everything for which both countries stand, apart from political creeds". Lymington's pro-German speeches during the Sudetenland crisis were considered so violent at a cabinet meeting on 13 September 1938 the Home Secretary, Sir John Simon, was asked to "restrain him from calling public meetings against going to war for Czechoslovakia". In the October 1938 edition of Quarterly Gazette, Lymington wrote: "Few stopped to think that such a war would benefit no one, but the Jews and the international communists... The fault did not lie with those whose standards were so warped that they believed alliance with the Czechs and the Bolsheviks against a regenerate Germany was right, but with us who have so far failed to carry regenerate values through the country".

In April 1939, Lymington complained that the German violation of the Munich Agreement in occupying the Czech part of Czecho-Slovakia on 15 March 1939 had greatly damaged the image of the Reich in Britain, but called for "Anglo-German understanding" which was "essential to the future of European civilisation". During the Danzig crisis, Lymington wrote in The New Pioneer "whoever won the battles in a European war, it would be a victory only for the Jews and Bolsheviks". The marked pro-German tenor to The New Pioneer to accusations that the journal was pro-Nazi, leading to Lymington to write response in July 1939 that "war with Germany would mean the end of our white civilisatin as we know it". Lymington blamed the entire British Jewish community for having pushed Britain to the brink of war with Germany in the Danzig crisis, writing that British Jews wanted a war with Germany in "revenge" for the Nazi persecution of the German Jewish community. Lymington wrote that there much that was "good" about Nazi Germany and that Britain had "the sense of common blood, common interests and ancient traditions" with the Reich.

The marked similarity of ideas of the English Array to the National Socialists in Germany was much noted at the time, and led Lymington to dissolve the English Array in 1940 as he feared he would be interned as a fascist. He joined the British People's Party in 1943.

== Organic movement ==
Wallop was an early advocate of organic farming in Britain. He has been described as a "central figure in the organic movement's coalescence during the 1930s and '40s."

In 1941, with Rolf Gardiner he founded the Kinship in Husbandry, a precursor of the Soil Association. It recruited Edmund Blunden, Arthur Bryant, H. J. Massingham, Walter James, 4th Baron Northbourne, Adrian Bell, and Philip Mairet.

== Later life ==
In 1948, he moved to his estate at Mount Elgon in the British colony of Kenya, where he owned an estate covering 10,000 acres. He served on the government-appointed Board of Agriculture for Kenya in the 1950s where he sought to modernise Kenyan agriculture and encourage organic farming. In 1957, he became the Minister of Agriculture for Kenya and served until 1960. He did not leave Kenya after independence in 1963 as most of the white settlers did. In 1965 most of his estate at Mount Elgon was nationalised by the Kenyan government, which used most of it to provide land for poor black farmers. Portsmouth was paid for his estate in Kenyan shillings, and in June 1965, Kenya introduced strict exchange controls on sterling transactions, to stop massive capital flight. Because Portsmouth chose to remain a Kenyan resident rather than emigrate, he could not transfer his compensation payout to Britain. He stayed on as the special agricultural adviser to President Jomo Kenyatta, who apparently greatly valued his advice. As president of Kenya, Kenyatta followed a policy of reconciliation with the white settlers, whom he encouraged to stay in Kenya after independence.

In 1976, Portsmouth suffered a serious stroke, which led him to return to Britain where he lived out his last days as an invalid until his death in 1984.

== Family and personal life ==
He was married twice and had five children.

On 31 July 1920, he married Mary Lawrence Post, daughter of Waldron Kintzing Post Sr., of Bayport, Long Island. They were divorced in 1936. They had two children:

- Oliver Kintzing Wallop, Viscount Lymington (14 January 1923 – 5 June 1984; aged 61), married as his second wife, Ruth Violet Sladen, daughter of Brig.-Gen. Gerald Carew Sladen CB CMG DSO MC, and Mabel Ursula, of the Orr Ewing baronets, and was the father of:
  - Quentin Wallop, 10th Earl of Portsmouth
- Lady Anne Camilla Evelyn Wallop (12 July 1925 – 25 January 2023; aged 97) who married Lord Rupert Nevill, younger son of Guy Larnach-Nevill, 4th Marquess of Abergavenny, and was a close friend of Elizabeth II.

On 14 August 1936, he married secondly, Bridget Cory Crohan, only daughter of Royal Navy Captain Patrick Bermingham Crohan MBE of Owlpen Manor, Gloucestershire. They had three children:

- Lady Philippa Dorothy Bluet Wallop (21 August 1937 – 31 August 1984; aged 47) who married Charles Cadogan, Viscount Chelsea and had issue
- Lady Jane Alianora Borlace Wallop (24 February 1939 – 30 November 2021; aged 82)
- Hon. Nicholas Valoynes Bermingham Wallop (14 July 1946 – 27 July 2026), married Lavinia Karmel, only daughter of David Karmel CBE

Gerard Wallop succeeded to the title of Earl of Portsmouth in 1943, on the death of his father Oliver, 8th Earl.

After the war, he moved to Kenya, where he lived for nearly 30 years. His seat at Farleigh House was let as a preparatory school from 1953.

Portsmouth's elder son, Oliver, predeceased him; on his death in 1984, the title passed to his grandson Quentin Wallop.

== Works ==
- Spring Song of Iscariot (Black Sun Press, 1929) poem, as Lord Lymington
- Ich Dien - the Tory Path (1931) as Lord Lymington
- Famine in England (1938)
- Alternative to Death (1943)
- A Knot of Roots (1965) autobiography

== Bibliography ==
- Barberis, Peter; McHugh, John; Tyldesley, Mike (2003). Encyclopedia of British and Irish Political Organizations.
- Burchardt, Jeremy (2002). Paradise Lost: Rural Idyll and Social Change in England Since 1800. I.B. Tauris.
- Conford, Philip (2005). "Organic Society: Agriculture and Radical Politics in the Career of Gerard Wallop, Ninth Earl of Portsmouth (1898-1984)" (PDF). Agricultural History Review. 53 (1): 78–96.
- Dietz, Bernhard (2018). Neo-Tories: The Revolt of British Conservatives against Democracy and Political Modernity (1929–1939). Translated by Copestake, Ian. Bloomsbury Academic. ISBN 978-1-4725-7003-1.
- Gottlieb, Julie V.; Linehan, Thomas P. (2004). The Culture of Fascism: Visions of the Far Right in Britain. Bloomsbury Academic. ISBN 9781860647987. Archived from the original on 2 June 2022.
- Griffiths, Richard (1980). Fellow Travellers of the Right British Enthusiasts for Nazi Germany, 1933-9. Oxford: Oxford University Press. ISBN 0094634602.
- Griffiths, Richard (1998). Patriotism Perverted: Captain Ramsay, the Right Club and English Anti-semitism, 1939-40. Constable. ISBN 9780094679207.
- Iliffe, Rob (1998). "A 'connected system'?". In William Hunter, Michael Cyril (ed.). Archives of the Scientific Revolution: The Formation and Exchange of Ideas in Seventeenth-century Europe. Suffolk, UK: Boydell Press. ISBN 9780851155531.
- Kushner, Tony; Knox, Katharine (1999). "The Fascist Era, 1933-1945". Refugees in an Age of Genocide: Global, National, and Local Perspectives. London, UK: Frank Cass. ISBN 9780714647838. Archived from the original on 2 June 2022.
- Linehan, Thomas (2000). "The Minor Parties, 'One-Man Bands' And Some Fellow-Travellers". British Fascism, 1918-1939: Parties, Ideology and Culture. Manchester, UK: Manchester University Press. ISBN 9780719050244. Archived from the original on 2 June 2022.
- Mosley, Charles, ed. (2003). Burke's Peerage, Baronetage & Knighthood (107 ed.). Burke's Peerage & Gentry. ISBN 0-9711966-2-1.
- Passerini, Luisa (1999). Europe in Love, Love in Europe: Imagination and Politics in Britain Between the Wars. Palgrave Macmillan. ISBN 9781860642814. Archived from the original on 2 June 2022.
- Pugh, Martin (2013). Hurrah for the Blackshirts! Fascists and Fascism in Britain Between the Wars. New York: Random House. ISBN 9781448162871.
- Scott, Christina (1992). A Historian and His World: A Life of Christopher Dawson. Transaction Publishers. ISBN 9781560000136. Archived from the original on 2 June 2022.
- Stone, Daniel (June 2003). "The English Mistery, the BUF, and the Dilemmas of British Fascism". The Journal of Modern History. 75 (2): 336–358. doi:10.1086/380138.
- Stone, Dan (2002). "Anthony Mario Ludovici: A 'Light-Weight Superman'". Breeding Superman: Nietzsche, Race and Eugenics in Edwardian and Interwar Britain. Liverpool University Press. ISBN 9780853239970.

Parliament of the United Kingdom
Preceded by Arthur Richard Holbrook	Member of Parliament for Basingstoke; 1929 – 1934	Succeeded by Henry Maxence Cavendish Drummond Wolff
Peerage of Great Britain
Preceded by Oliver Wallop	Earl of Portsmouth; 1943–1984	Succeeded by Quentin Wallop
