= Paul Einzig =

- Born: 25 September 1897
- Died: 9 May 1973 (aged 75)
- Occupations: Writer, Journalist, Economist

Paul Einzig (25 August 1897 – 8 May 1973) was an economic and political writer and journalist. He wrote over 50 books, alongside many articles for newspapers and journals, and regular columns for the newspapers Financial News (which became Financial Times) and Commercial and Financial Chronicle.

== Biography ==
Einzig was born in Braşov, Transylvania (then a part of Hungary, now Romania), into a Jewish family, and educated in Hungary, England, and France. He earned a degree as Doctor of Political and Economic Sciences at the University of Paris from 1921 to 1923. He moved to England in 1919, becoming a citizen in 1929.

Einzig wrote his first article for The Economist in 1919 and contributed to The Economic Journal in 1920 with an article entitled "The Monetary Economy of Bolshevism." He became the Paris correspondent for the Financial News during his doctorate studies, rising to foreign editor upon his move back to London. Einzig used his regular Lombard Street column in the Financial News to provide updates on international finance as well as express his personal views and fight for what he believed were worthy causes. He was the primary investigator behind the "Czech Gold" scandal, where the Bank of England had transferred substantial reserves of Czechoslovak gold to the Reichsbank following the German occupation of Czechoslovakia.

Einzig became political correspondent for the Financial News in 1940 and continued in this role until ill health forced him to resign in 1956. He spent the remainder of his career in freelance work and writing his weekly column in the Commercial and Financial Chronicle.

He had a wife, Ruth, a son, Richard and a daughter. He died in London in 1973.

== Works ==
- International Gold Movements, 1929; 2d ed. enl., 1931
- The Bank for International Settlements, 1930
- Behind the Scenes of International Finance, 1931
- The Fight for Financial Supremacy, 1931
- The World Economic Crisis, 1929–1931, 1931
- Montague Norman: A Study in Financial Statesmanship, 1932
- The Bank for International Settlements, 1932
- The Tragedy of the Pound, 1932
- The Comedy of the Pound, 1933
- The Economic Foundations of Fascism, 1933
- The Sterling-Dollar-Franc Tangle, 1933
- Exchange Control, 1934
- France’s Crisis, 1934
- Germany’s Default, 1934
- The Economics of Rearmament, 1934; reprint 2014
- The Future of Gold, 1934
- Bankers, Statesmen and Economists, 1935
- The Exchange Clearing System, 1935
- World Finance Since 1914, 1935. (American ed.: World Finance, 1914–1935, 1935)
- Monetary Reform in Theory and Practice, 1936
- World Finance, 1935–1937, 1937
- World Finance, 1937–1938, 1938
- Economic Problems of the Next War, 1939
- World Finance, 1938–1939, 1939
- Economic Warfare, 1940
- Europe in Chains', 1940
- World Finance, 1939–1940, 1940
- Appeasement Before, During and After the War, 1941
- Economic Warfare 1939–1940, 1941
- Can We Win the Peace?, 1942
- The Japanese New Order in Asia, 1943
- Currency after the War: The British and American Plans, 1944
- Freedom from Want, 1944
- Primitive Money, in its Ethnological, Historical and Economic Aspects, 1949; 1951; 1963
- Inflation, 1952
- How Money is Managed: The Ends and Means of Monetary Policy, 1954
- The Economic Consequence of Automation, 1956
- The Control of the Purse: Progress and Decline of Parliament's Financial Control, 1959
- In the Centre of Things, 1960
- A Dynamic Theory of Forward Exchange, 1961
- The History of Foreign Exchange, 1962; 2d ed., 1970
- Monetary Politics: Ends and Means, 1964 (new version of How Money is Managed)
- The Euro-Dollar System: Practice and Theory of International Interest Rates, 1964; reprint 1967
- Foreign Dollar Loans in Europe, 1965
- Primitive Money, in its Ethnological, Historical and Economic Aspects, 2d ed. rev. and enl., 1966
- Textbook on Foreign Exchange, 1966
- Foreign Exchange Crises: An Essay in Economic Pathology, 1968
- Leads and Lags. The Main Cause of Devaluation, 1968
- Decline and Fall? Britain's Crisis in the Sixties, 1969
- The Euro-Bond Market, 1969
- The Case Against Floating Exchanges, 1970
- Parallel Money Markets. 1. The New Markets in London, 1971
- The Case Against Joining the Common Market, 1971
- A Textbook on Monetary Policy, 1972
- Destiny of Gold, 1972
- Destiny of the Dollar, 1972
- Parallel Money Markets. 2. Overseas Markets, 1972
- Roll-over Credits. The System of Adaptable Interest Rates, 1973
- The Euro-dollar System. Practice and Theory of International Interest Rates, 1973
