= Dark social media =

Concept in online marketing and advertising

Dark social media, dark social, or dark traffic are terms coined by the online marketing and advertising community to refer to social sharing of URLs that do not contain any digital referral (i.e. tracking) information about the source. The concept of a "dark" link is generally used by people working in web analytics as well as in online advertising, who have come to expect that they will be able to monitor and profile website visitors and app users, sometimes in quite controversial ways such as mouse tracking to follow people's activities by tracking their mouse movements.

Privacy advocates would typically refer to a URL without tracking information as a clean URL, i.e. one which simply takes the user to the requested web page or resource. Some technology providers have made these privacy-enhancing technologies a particular focus of their operating system and web browser applications. Legislation such as the European Union's General Data Protection Regulation and Digital Markets Act specifically targets this surveillance capitalism approach to providing Internet products and services. To protect user privacy, the browser Mozilla Firefox added a feature to "Copy Without Site Tracking" for the dropdown menu when right-clicking its address bar.

== Defining "Dark Social" ==
Unlike sharing on a public social networking service like Facebook, dark social occurs privately through IRC channels, emails, SMS, or simply through copy-and-paste and other forms of private sharing. Not to confuse with deep web, dark social media is not about the content but the traffic of online sharing. These sharing activities are often categorized as direct, typed/bookmarked, or in other similar forms in today's web analytics services. In 2014, it was believed that Dark Social accounted for 69% of sharing activities globally, while Facebook only accounted for 23%.

The exact nature of dark social media is still unknown. The term "dark" in its name implies that it is associated with the unknown or the unseen, much like dark energy in astronomy.

== History ==
Alexis Madrigal was curious about where traffic was really coming from for the site that he worked for, The Atlantic. He grew up in a time when the web was just being built and knew there were other ways to share information, not just through big name sites like Facebook. This led him to believe that a large portion of web traffic was not coming from "bookmarked" or "typed in" sources as he was being led to believe. With the help of web analytics firm, Chartbeat, he was able to quantify this traffic into something much more meaningful. The article that he then wrote brought about the usage of the term Dark Social.

Dark social has also been known as direct social or dark traffic. However, Alexis Madrigal's term "Dark Social" became the most widely used in the online marketing community.

Recent studies and reports suggest that Dark Social can account for a significant portion of social sharing, often ranging between 80% and 95% of all online content sharing. Much traffic attributed to direct sources or 'unknown' comes from private sharing via messaging apps, emails, and other untraceable methods. Brands are now focusing on using advanced tracking tools and strategies, like URL shorteners and social listening, to understand better and leverage this hidden traffic. As a result, Dark Social is increasingly recognized as a crucial component of digital marketing that requires dedicated strategies to track and utilize effectively.

== Desktop vs mobile ==
Dark social media can be perceived differently when looking at desktop computers vs mobile computers. In 2014, almost 50% of the total external mobile traffic was Dark Social traffic, meaning that the traffic did not have a referrer showing where they were coming from. In contrast, only one-third of the external desktop traffic was from Dark Social.

In 2014, two years after Alexis Madrigal wrote the original post about dark social, he started to notice that dark social traffic could come from mobile devices as well. Madrigal mentioned that since October 2015, Facebook had changed their algorithm for the mobile app, which resulted in the media publisher receiving over 100% more traffic than before. In the meantime, he has also noticed the Atlantic, the company he used to work for, received a lot of dark social traffic, which was not the Facebook mobile traffic.

Alexis Madrigal later performed an experiment to confirm his theory that the dark social traffic boost was indeed from Facebook mobile app. He found that the referrer links from Facebook's mobile app do not always pass to the destination website, which creates Dark Social traffic for mobile devices. An updated Chartbeat report also confirmed that part of the Dark Social traffic was generated by Facebook mobile app and its own users. In addition to Facebook mobile app, dark social traffic can also come from Reddit mobile app, Gmail and Instant messaging apps as well.

In one of RadiumOne's report published in February 2016, the dark side of mobile sharing, the company stated they have found that 84% of the online traffic is coming from Dark Social channels to date. Furthermore, they also showed that out of all the Dark Social traffic, 62% are from mobile devices, while only 38% are from desktops. The rise of smart phones and mobile apps had largely increased the Dark Social traffic on mobile devices over the last few years. The amount of Dark Social traffic from mobile devices jumps from 53% in 2014 to 62% in 2016, while the Dark Social traffic that comes from desktops decreases from 47% in 2014 to 38% in 2016.

== Marketing and analytics ==
Dark social traffic consists mostly of one-to-one messaging through non-dark channels such as Facebook Messenger and Snapchat rather than more commonly used one-to-many methods; for example, sharing to a Twitter feed, or Facebook wall, which traditional analytics tools rely upon. Links shared through private messaging methods may not include referral tags and to an analytics tool, they can simply appear as though they came through direct traffic or could include referral tags copy and pasted from another non-dark social channel.

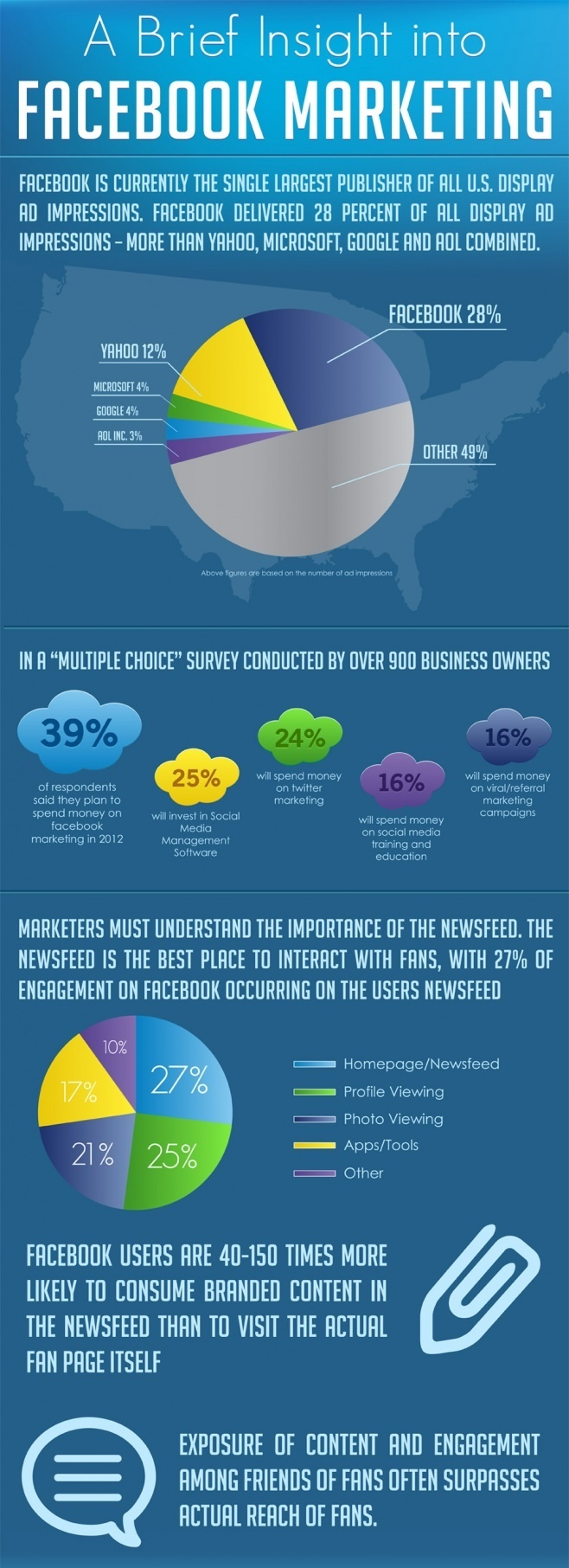
A chart of how social media are used for marketing, such as Facebook, Yahoo, Microsoft, Google, etc.

Because the referral tags are not always carried over through private messaging, it becomes impossible to tell if a person sharing through dark traffic had originally obtained the content through another referral method or directly copy-pasting the link. This makes it difficult for marketers to understand how effective their social media marketing strategy is and make changes accordingly.

To combat this lack of transparency, websites can include more attractive ways to share links than simply copy-pasting into another application; for example, sites can implement highly visible share buttons, a copy-paste button, or buttons to share a link with a referral tag directly to a dark social channel like WhatsApp, Facebook Messenger, or email. Rules can also be made within traditional analytics tools to filter out dark social traffic that can include direct links, but exclude those that weren't referred from the homepage. Analytics tools are also beginning to incorporate the ability to distinguish between dark social copy-paste based traffic and other types of traffic.

== Relationship to the invisible web and dark web ==
The invisible web is also known as the deep web. Where dark social is referring to web traffic that cannot be analyzed, invisible web is referring to websites and data that are not indexed in search engines. In essence, both kinds of information are invisible to the general population on the Internet. Dark social data cannot be found by web analytics software to see where traffic originates from and invisible web data will not show when using search engines like Google Search or Microsoft Bing. Both of these hidden results are unintentional. The dark web is associated with Dark social and invisible web, but mainly because of its hidden nature. Dark web data is data that is intentionally hidden on the Internet because those involved wish to remain anonymous.

== Users ==
There is interest in who shares content and how they share it. The psychology of dark social sharing has found that people share for three reasons.

1. Identity and context

Dark social sharing allows for individualism as people are able to freely express themselves in choosing what- and with whom- to share rather than broadcasting everything to all their "friends".

2. Relationship building

Dark social sharing creates a "personal" channel where sharing elevates and builds personal relationships, even defying geographical boundaries.

3. Social currency

Dark Social sharing allows for people to feel helpful, on trend, or interesting. When sharing to a smaller, intimate social circle, the sharer gets to be knowledgeable within their groups.

Email and IM are the common sources of dark social sharing but Facebook may actually be the part of the cause of the increase in dark social-through their chatting and messaging services. Other sources of Dark Social are Reddit, StumbleUpon, Twitter, Tumblr, LinkedIn and Google+, WhatsApp, Viber, Kwik, Firechat, OM and Livetext. There is some evidence by Pew research that age accounts for who is sharing darkly and those sharing by means that can be tracked easier. Baby Boomers (born between 1946 and 1964) and Gen Xers (born between 1965 and 1981) commonly share by email and word of mouth. In fact, Gen Xers are the heaviest users of email, which is considered dark social. Millennials (born 1982–1995) and younger tend toward social media and sharing through these applications, often reported as dark. In addition, sharing professionally and darkly, as on LinkedIn, requires upwards of 15 hours a week to have an impact. Certain platforms also attract other types of populations such as blogs with the LGBT community.
