= John Wallop =

English soldier and diplomat

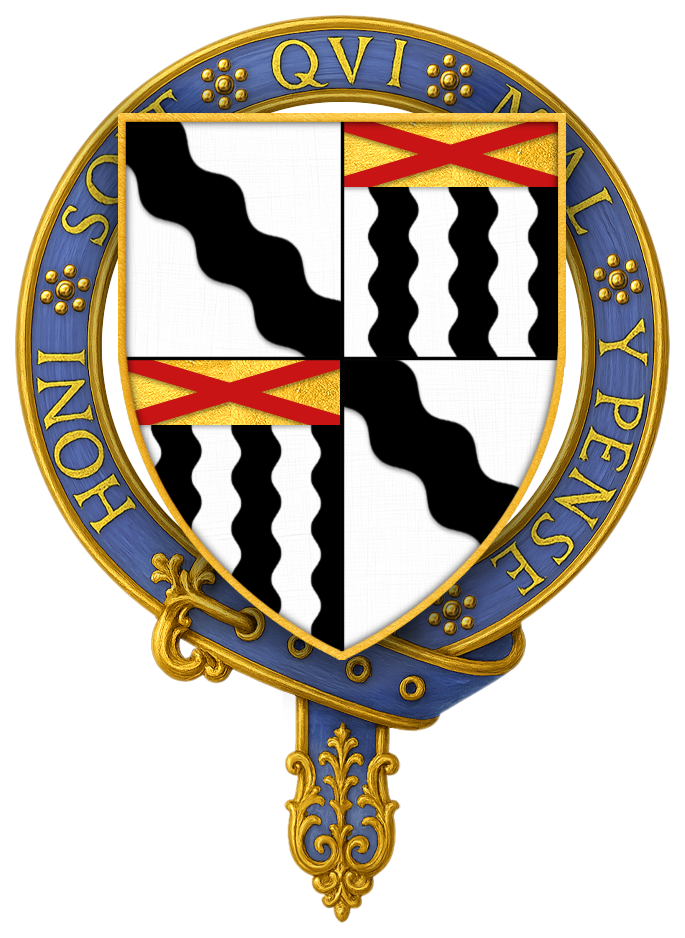
Arms of Sir John Wallop, KG

Sir John Wallop, KG (c. 1490 – 13 July 1551) was an English soldier and diplomat who belonged to an old Hampshire family from the village of Farleigh Wallop.

== Biography ==
Wallop was son of Stephen Wallop, by the daughter of Hugh Ashley. (Note: The family of Wallop had, according to a pedigree drawn up by Augustine Vincent, been very long settled in Hampshire. They held various manors there, but John Wallop, who lived in the time of Henry VI and Edward IV, having inherited Farleigh, or, as it was afterwards called, Farleigh-Wallop, from his mother, made that the chief residence of his family. A son of this John Wallop, Richard Wallop, was sheriff of Hampshire in 1502, and seems to have died just after holding that office. By his wife, Elizabeth Hampton, he left no children, and therefore was succeeded by his brother, Sir Robert Wallop, and he, also dying without issue in 1535, was succeeded by Sir John Wallop, his nephew. Thus it will be evident that Sir John Wallop had at first mainly his own exertions to depend on.)

Wallop may have taken part in Sir Edward Poynings's expedition to the Low Countries in 1511 and may have been knighted there. He certainly was knighted before 1513, when he accompanied Sir Edward Howard on his unfortunate but glorious journey to Brest. In July 1513 he was captain of the Sancho de Gara, a hired ship, and in May 1514 he was captain of the Gret Barbara. In these years he did a great deal of damage to French shipping. On 12 August 1515, he was sent with letters for Margaret, Duchess of Savoy, regent of the Netherlands. (Note: This may really be the journey which Strype, who has been followed by Collins, places in 1513.)

In 1516 he left England on a more honourable errand. Armed with a letter from Henry VIII, dated 14 September 1516, to Emmanuel I, king of Portugal, he sailed to that country and offered his services at his own expense against the Moors. He remained fighting at or near Tangier, and then came back to England having been made a knight of the order of Christ. In September 1518, his name occurs as one of the king's pensioners, and for the next three years he was serving under Earl of Surrey in Ireland, frequently being the means of communication between the Lord Deputy and Henry VIII. Wallop took a prominent part in the fighting in France in 1522 and 1523. Doubtless as a reward he was on 31 March 1524 appointed high marshal of Calais.

In September 1526, Wallop was sent on an embassy. He first went to Margaret, Duchess of Savoy, then to the Archduke, reaching Cologne on 30 September. He remained there until well on in November, writing to Cardinal Wolsey as to the progress of the Turkish War. On 30 November he was back in Brussels with Hacket, thence he returned again early in December to Cologne, and went on to Mainz. On 12 January 1527, he was at Augsburg. On 1 February he was at Prague, and saw the entry of Ferdinand, future king of the Romans, before his coronation as King of Bohemia. It was doubtless at this time that he received the two great gilt cups that he mentions in his will as having been given him by Ferdinand. On 26 April, he was at Olmütz. On 20 May, he was at Breslau in Silesia, visiting Sigismund I, King of Poland, who made vague but pleasant promises of hostility against "the ungraciose sect of Lutere". King Ferdinand would not let him go to Hungary, where he wished to communicate with the waiwode. On 11 July, he was at Vienna, and probably returned to England in the autumn.

Wallop seems to have paid a hasty visit to Paris in January 1528. On 29 January 1528, he received an annuity of fifty marks. About 17 February he left England on a formal embassy to France, and wrote from Poissy on 29 February that he had seen Francis and congratulated him on his recovery from illness. On 2 April 1528, he was at St. Maur "sore vexed with the coughe and murre". He was made, with Richard Paget, surveyor of the subsidies on kerseys on 17 March 1528 at a joint salary of £100. He remained in Paris for some time, but was at Calais on 2 June.

Wallop rapidly received valuable rewards for his services. He had long been a gentleman of the privy chamber. On 1 March 1522 he had received the constableship of Trim in Ireland, but had surrendered it before 1524. On 6 April 1529, he became keeper of the lordship and park of Dytton, Buckinghamshire. On 23 June 1530 he received a formal grant of the lieutenancy of Calais as "from 6 October last".

This was a promotion, as the lieutenant of Calais who commanded the citadel was next in rank to the deputy. He was at Calais during the great repairs of 1531.

In April 1532 Wallop was sent as ambassador to Paris, which he visited at frequent intervals as the English resident for the next eight or nine years. He went into the south of France with Gardiner and Bryan in 1533, and was at Marseilles on 5 October at the meeting of Francis and the pope. The Venetian Marin Giustinian, writing from Paris on 15 April 1533, spoke of Wallop as one who did not approve of the divorce. He was probably in London in the middle of 1534, but was certainly back in Paris in December, and remained there for the first half of 1535, taking part in the attempt to persuade Melanchthon to come to England. In October, he was at Dijon, and remained for some time in the south. He was at Lyon from the beginning of 1536 until June. In July there was a rumour that he was going to Spain. A curious letter to him from Henry, dated 12 September 1536, directs him to investigate the strength of the French fortresses. On 2 October 1536, he was at Valence. He was back in Paris in December and in January reported the wedding of James V and Madeleine of Valois, noting their rich costume. He left Paris on 1 March 1537, and was in London in May.

Wallop was now rich, as his uncle had been some time dead. In 1538 he was granted the lands of the dissolved priory of Barlinch, Somerset, and some manors in Somerset and Devonshire. In May 1539 he was in the Pale of Calais, where there were troubles as to religion.

In February 1540, Wallop succeeded Bonner as ambassador resident at Paris; at Abbeville he was presented to the king of France and had an interview with the queen of Navarre. He had reached Paris by June 1540, and was soon joined there by Carne. For the rest of this year he followed the court, sometimes going as far as Rouen or Caudebec. Wallop visited the Palace of Fontainebleau with Francis I and wrote about the magnificence of its gallery. He was an advocate for the employment of one of the artists, Niccolo da Modena, at Henry's court.

William, lord Sandys of the Vyne, captain of Guisnes, died on 4 December 1540, and Wallop's friends made a successful application in his favour. It is strange that the captaincy of Guisnes should have been considered a more advantageous post than that which he already held, particularly as we know that Francis liked him. Chapuys, indeed, says that many thought he had been retired for fear he should withdraw himself. On 18 January 1541, he was revoked in favour of Lord William Howard. Suddenly he fell into disgrace. He was accused of "sundry notable offences and treasons done towards us", but in consideration of his long service he was allowed to explain his conduct.

Brought before the council (some time earlier than 26 March 1541),

at his first examination he stood very stiffly to his truth and circumspection, neither calling to remembrance what he had written with his own hand. … Whereupon the king's majesty of his goodness caused his own sundry letters written to Pate, that traitor, and others to be laid before him; which when he once saw and read he cried for mercy, acknowledging his offences with the danger he was in by the same, and refusing all shifts and trials, for indeed the things were most manifest. Nevertheless, he made most earnest and hearty protestation, that the same never passed him upon any evil mind or malicious purpose, but only upon wilfulness … which he confessed had been in him, whereby he had not only in the things of treason but also [in] other ways … meddled above his capacity and whereof he had no commission, far otherwise than became a good subject. … Whereupon his majesty conceiving that the man did not at the first deny his transgressions upon any purpose to cloak and cover the same but only by "slippernes of memory", being a man unlearned, and taking his submission pardoned him.

Queen Catherine Howard, it seems, had made intercession, and Henry himself, who was fond of men of Wallop's type, would not need much persuading. Thus he became captain of Guisnes in March 1541.

At Guisnes, he remained, no doubt taking an active part in the engineering operations in the Pale of this time, and attending the meetings of the deputy's council, of which, as captain of Guisnes, he was a member. In 1543, when Henry and Charles were in alliance and an English force was ordered to co-operate with the imperialists in the north of France, the Earl of Surrey supposed he should have the command; but, to his disappointment, it was given to Wallop, with Sir Thomas Seymour as his marshal; Surrey had to accept a subordinate post. The expedition effected little, though the soldiers were long in the field. Wallop was ill during part of the operations, but gained great glory, and Emperor Charles V commended his conduct to Henry VIII.

On Christmas Eve 1543 Wallop was elected KG, the king providing him with robes from his own wardrobe. He was installed on 18 May 1544. The war of that year kept him busily occupied, as he had to keep a large number of men at Guisnes. During the next few years there are many notes of his activity in the Acts of the Privy Council. On 19 June 1545 he was specially thanked by the council for his courage. In 1546 he was placed on the second commission for the delimitation of the frontier of the Boulonnais, and in March following he was appointed on the third commission for the same purpose. As relations between France and England grew strained, Wallop was involved in various frontier conflicts which were the subject of prolonged recriminations between the English and French courts. He retained his post during the ensuing war, 1549–50, and after the conclusion of peace was on 29 November 1550 once more made a commissioner for the delimitation of the English and French boundaries.

Wallop died of the sweating sickness at Guisnes on 13 July 1551; he was buried with some state there, presumably in the churchyard. He had had a good deal to do with the restoration of the church. (Note: Wallop's will, dated 22 May 1551, is printed in Collins's Peerage and in Testamenta Vetusta p. 732 (Archbold 1899, p. 155).) He left a large annuity to Nicholas Alexander, who had been his secretary, and was afterwards hanged at Tyburn for cowardice.

== Character ==
Machyn, in speaking of the death of Wallop, calls him "a noble captain as ever was". Chapuys on 21 June 1532 spoke of him as being better trained to war than to the management of political affairs. In 1899, his portrait, by Holbein, belonged to the Earl of Portsmouth.

== Family ==
Wallop married, first, Elizabeth, daughter of Sir Oliver St. John, and widow of Gerald Fitzgerald, 8th Earl of Kildare; secondly, Elizabeth, daughter of Sir Clement Harleston of Ockendon in the county of Essex. She survived him. By neither wife did he leave any issue, and his estates passed therefore to his brother, Sir Oliver Wallop, and, he dying in 1566, his son Henry Wallop, succeeded.
