= Wallop =

American software company

Wallop is an American software company that was spun off from Microsoft in 2003 to provide a social networking service, and from 2008 made Adobe Flash-based applications for other social networks. Wallop was a research project from the Social Computing Group that was a part of the Microsoft Research team. In the beginning, membership to Wallop was limited so that the testing groups were more controlled for trial purposes.

== History ==
Wallop was originally designed around 2003 as an Internet social networking service from Microsoft Research. As a startup, the company behind Wallop was backed by $13 million from Microsoft and venture capitalists including Norwest Venture Partners, Bay Partners and Consor Capital. The company was later spun off of Microsoft.

While the Wallop team was working on launching their website, however, the expansion of other social networks and their opening up of APIs led to Wallop's changing directions. Instead of trying to compete with these already established social networking providers, the company scrapped their Beta application and, as stated in their website, "Wallop retooled their product and focused on developing cutting-edge applications for leading social networking platforms like Facebook, and Bebo". As of 2008, the company left its social networking service model and went into creating applications for other social networking sites instead.

== Products ==
Around 2009, Wallop had two products they called Cool Cards and Party On!. These applications were hosted by Wallop, and built using Facebook and Bebo APIs, thus supporting those two social networking platforms by default, but could also be posted to other sites by embedding Adobe Flash applications into HTML.

Cool Cards is a simple Adobe Flash-based application to display card-like graphics that users can customize before posting in someone's social networking site profile. Party On! is also an Adobe Flash-based application which can also be posted in the user's profile, and allows users to create a customized invitation that will keep track of guest lists, making a place for people to plan parties inside such a profile.

== Social network ==
As a social networking provider in its beta release, Wallop, with its application accessible through the domain name wallop.com, provided users with the basic features a social networking site provides, such as creation of personalized profiles where users can put the personal information, establishing links with other users as "friends", and being able to react to other users' profiles by being able to leave comments. Additional features such as ability to upload and show image files, creation of blogs, and a fully functional music player where users can upload audio files within their accounts and put restrictions as to who can play these files, were also built into the application.

Aside from being supposedly a social networking application, Wallop was originally designed also as an online market place for mods that are to be made and sold by its users. It was stated that these mods, as they used to call the software members will develop and sell to the community, will allow users to add characters, graphics, games, backgrounds, and more to put on their profiles, with price ranging from $0.99 to $4.00. The concept gave a lot of possibilities for users on what applications, such as a calendar or a flash game, to put on their account profiles. The beta release already had a sandbox and a developer API established, before Wallop suddenly changed course to instead becoming a company providing users of then competitors the ability to add Wallop's applications to their profiles.

=== Public reception ===
With the site's front-end functionality generally depending in Adobe Flash technology, it was at that aspect different from prevailing social networks, such as Friendster and MySpace, which by that time at 2003, was mostly rendered as traditional HTML pages. Using Adobe Flash gave the site aesthetics unique to its contemporaries, but making it not functional with browsers having no Adobe Flash installed.

One aspect of Wallop's beta release that most people react about, is its continued usage of the invite-only account creation strategy, wherein users will only be able to sign up for the site if an existing member invites them. It may be argued that it might have been only intended to be so in the beta release and that signups would have been open to all visitors afterward, nevertheless some felt that the approach long abandoned by other social networks, such as Facebook in October 2006, somehow contributed to its failure to get as much user-base possible.

Having started as a Microsoft Research project, the beta release of Wallop social networking site was moderately covered among tech savvies, with several articles written about it in technology related news websites. Several of such articles and some blogs speculated that Wallop would be Microsoft's answer to then growing demand in the social networking arena. Some entities, such as the internet-based community behind stonerocket.net who created the now defunct wallopmodding.com, even made sites dedicated to making Wallop mods with the aim of making business out of Wallop users. Nonetheless, time has proved these speculations false as Microsoft unveiled Windows Live services and with Wallop eventually leaving its goal as a main player in the social networking scene.
