= Farleigh Wallop =

Village and parish in Hampshire, England

Coordinates: 51.2166°N 1.1104°W

- Location within Hampshire
- District: Basingstoke and Deane
- Shire county: Hampshire
- Region: South East
- Country: England
- Sovereign state: United Kingdom
- Post town: BASINGSTOKE
- Postcode district: RG25
- Dialling code: 01256
- Police: Hampshire and Isle of Wight
- Fire: Hampshire and Isle of Wight
- Ambulance: South Central
- UK Parliament: Basingstoke

Farleigh Wallop is a small village and civil parish in Hampshire, England, approximately 4.7 miles (7.6 km) south of Basingstoke on the slopes of Farleigh Hill (208 m). The parish includes about 1,725 acres (6.98 km^{2}).

Since 1486, Farleigh Wallop has been the home of the Wallop family, including John Wallop, Henry Wallop, and Gerard Wallop, 9th Earl of Portsmouth, whose seat, Farleigh House, is in the village. In the 1930s, Farleigh Wallop was the centre of the English Array group.

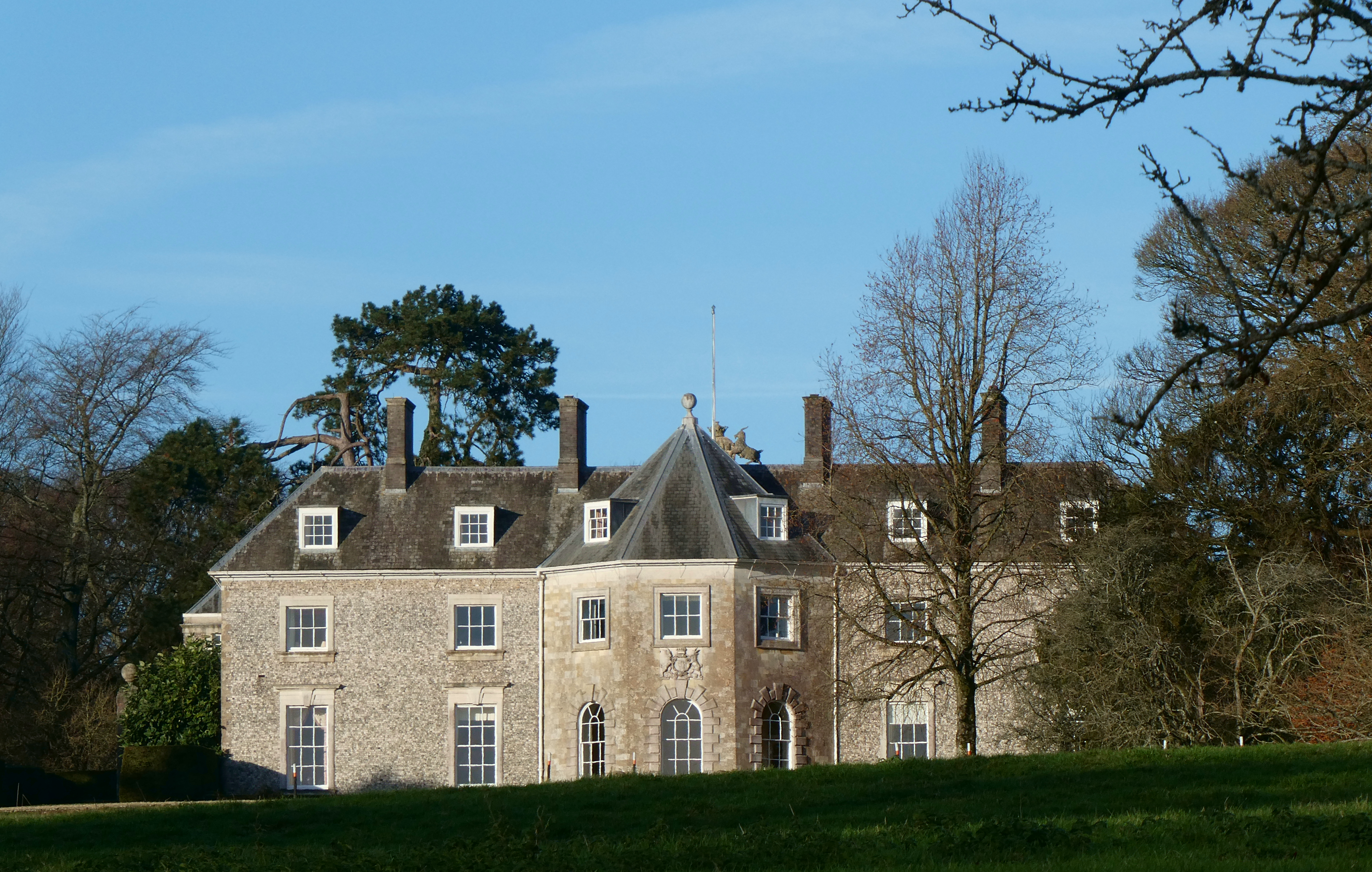
The garden front (south east front) of Farleigh House

Farleigh House is an 18th-century country mansion in the centre of the village. It is the country seat of the Earl of Portsmouth, and has been in the Wallop family hands since the 15th century. An earlier mansion on the same site burned down in the 17th century and the present building replaced it. In 2024, it offers a location for corporate events, private events, and is a filming location.

The Church of England parish church is Saint Andrew's, which stands alone in a field somewhat away from the present village. It is thought that the homes that once were beside the church were destroyed in the English Civil War. The church was entirely rebuilt both around 1733 and also around 1871, with the tower, dating from 1873, having three bells. The church has memorials to members of the Wallop family.

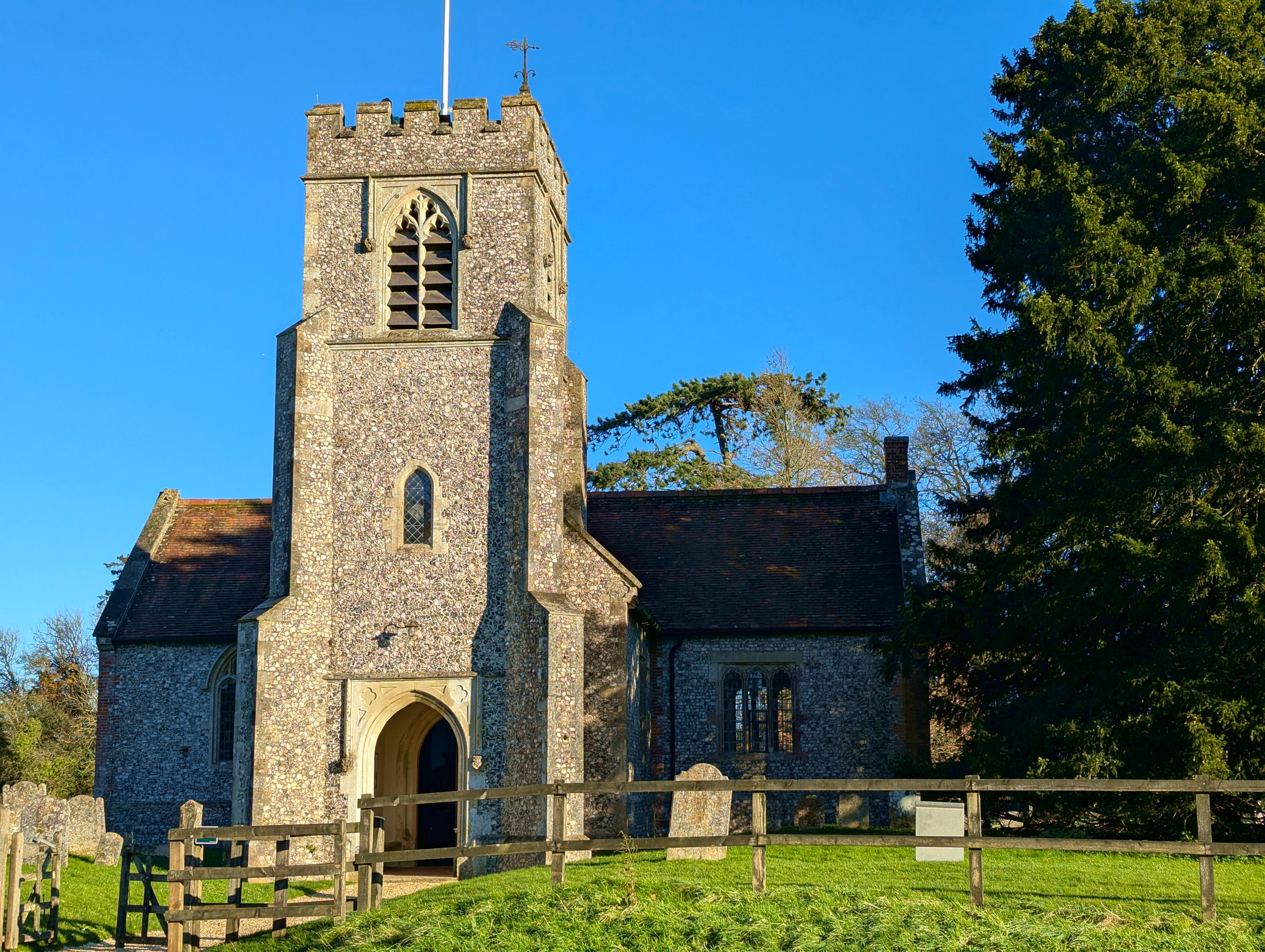
St Andrew's Church at Farleigh Wallop

== Articles ==
- Stone, Daniel (June 2003). "The English Mistery, the BUF, and the Dilemmas of British Fascism". The Journal of Modern History. 75 (2): 336–358.
