= Rolf Gardiner =

English rural revivalist

Rolf Gardiner at his wedding to Marabel Hodgkin in 1932. The North Skelton sword dance group form the guard of honour.

Henry Rolf Gardiner (5 November 1902 – 26 November 1971) was an English rural revivalist who helped to bring back folk dance styles including Morris dancing and sword dancing. He also founded groups significant in the British history of organic farming; his forestry methods were far ahead of their time and he was a founder member of the Soil Association. He sympathised with Nazism, more specifically its pro-ruralist policies, and participated in inter-war far right politics. He organised summer camps with music, dance and community aims across class and cultures.

== Early life ==
He was born in Fulham the son of Sir Alan Henderson Gardiner and his wife Hedwig, née Von Rosen. He was educated at West Downs School from 1913, Rugby School, and then at Bedales School. He was a student at St John's College, Cambridge, where he was a member of the Kibbo Kift youth group.

Initially he was a youth leader, involved in exchanges with Germany. He was heavily influenced in the 1920s by D. H. Lawrence; he visited Lawrence in Switzerland in 1928, and has been called his first genuine "disciple".

In this period, he was also much concerned with English folk dance, and convinced Morris dance revivalist Mary Neal that Morris was an essentially masculine form. He founded the Travelling Morrice in 1924, with Arthur Heffer, having taken a team of English dancers to Germany in 1922, and in 1923 met a few of the surviving dancers while walking in the Cotswolds with the poet Christopher Scaife. Gardiner was not, however, a founder of the Morris Ring, set up in 1934.

== Landowner ==
His uncle, the composer Henry Balfour Gardiner, bought Gore Farm in North Dorset in 1924. Rolf took over the farm in 1927 and continued what became a large-scale forestation project, based on training he had received at Dartington Hall, with conifers and beech trees. Here he set up a support group, the Gore Kinship.

He married Mariabella Honor Hodgkin in 1932; she was the daughter of the Irish fabric designer Florence Hodgkin. In 1933, he and 'Marabel' bought the estate at Springhead, near Fontmell Magna, Dorset. He became active in Dorset society, becoming a member of Dorset County Council between 1937 and 1946, High Sheriff of Dorset 1967–1968, President of the Dorset Federation of Young Farmers Clubs 1944–1946, Chairman and then President of the Dorset branch of the Council for the Protection of Rural England 1957–1972, as well as other rural and landscape committees and working parties.

He and his wife developed the Springhead Ring as a music, theatre and crafts network, as well as farming the estate and developing forestry operations. It also hosted much musical activity. The rural writer John Stewart Collis spent a year after the Second World War working for Gardiner, thinning a 14-acre ash wood on the estate; this formed the material for his 1947 book Down to Earth.

Gardiner was a founder member of the Soil Association and applied organic principles to both farm and forest. The family owned tea-growing estates in Nyasaland (now in Thyolo District, Malawi), known as the Nchima Tea and Tung Estate, of which Gardiner became chairman. He was active in the 1950s in dealing with colonial officials, with a view to conserving the underlying land. He had written about erosion in Nyasaland and Uganda already in the 1930s, in the New English Weekly. The Nchima estate became the Nchima Trust in 1962.

== Politics of the far right ==
He was editor of the magazine Youth from 1923, while a student. It had been founded in 1920, and at that point was left-leaning and supported guild socialism. In Gardiner's time it became internationally oriented and Germanophile, and his own political interests turned to Social Credit. He also published articles by John Hargrave, with whom he had associated in the Kibbo Kift. After its split from the Woodcraft Folk, Kibbo Kift was in transition, en route for the Social Credit Party of Great Britain and Northern Ireland ("Green Shirts").

It has been suggested that Gardiner moved from the ideas of guild socialism and social credit, current in the circle of A. R. Orage, towards a search for a masculine brotherhood, through his involvement in the "folk revival". His views of folk music and dance have been called "fundamentalist". In any case he took up with and formed small groups, rather than political organisations. He expressly rejected overtures made to him by members of Mosley's party, which at the time was gaining ground in rural areas in response to the effects of the depression and tithe collection on farming.

Gardiner later broke with Hargrave, of whom Lawrence disapproved. In 1929, Gardiner was writing with approval in the Times Literary Supplement of the Jugendbewegung (German Youth Movement) and its anti-scientific outlook. He debated the German Youth Movement in 1934 with Leslie Paul, in the pages of The Adelphi.

In a series of publications from 1928, he articulated racial theories (Baltic peoples versus Mediterranean peoples) and the need for national reversals of "impoverishment" of the stock. It has been said that he was an "ecocentric" looking for a united and pagan England and Germany, and a supporter of Nazi pro-ruralist policies. He reportedly expressed antisemitic views from 1933, writing first in German. However, as his mother was half Austrian Jewish, this is unlikely, and in the late thirties he specifically repudiated this. His thinking moved from a belief in the honest value of work, to connection and belonging, and ultimately to a vision of the interplay between the health of soil, animals, crops and people.

He was a member of the English Mistery, and then of the English Array, formed in 1936. Writing in the Array's Quarterly Gazette, Gardiner was an apologist for German "leadership" in Central Europe, dictatorships, and "racial regeneration". He later wrote for the periodical New Pioneer, set up in December 1938 by Lord Lymington and John Beckett as a pro-German and antisemitic organ.

After World War II, he kept in touch with Richard Walther Darré, an SS leader and NSDAP food and agriculture minister of the Nazi era, who had been one of the chief proponents of the links between a people and the land.

== Kinship in Husbandry ==
In 1941 he formed with H. J. Massingham and Gerald Wallop, Lord Lymington, the Kinship in Husbandry, a group of a dozen men with an interest in rural revival. It was a precursor organisation of the Soil Association, which was set up in 1946. Original members were: Adrian Bell, Edmund Blunden, Arthur Bryant, J. E. Hosking, Douglas Kennedy, Philip Mairet, Lord Northbourne, Robert Payne and C. Henry Warren. The group first met in Blunden's rooms at Merton College, Oxford, in September 1941. They drew ideas from agricultural experts: Albert Howard, Robert McCarrison, George Stapledon and G. T. Wrench. Other members included Laurence Easterbrook and Jorian Jenks. In official eyes, this grouping or think-tank was treated with less suspicion than its correlated far-right political organisations. It had some effect on agricultural policy, particularly in relation to self-sufficiency. It also affected the thinking of the Rural Reconstruction Association founded in 1935 by Montague Fordham, and the Biodynamic Association.

== Nudism ==
Gardiner published in his maiden issue of Youth in June 1923, a first-hand account of The Cult of Nakedness in Germany by Harold Barlow. It was one of the earliest attempts to introduce the German Nacktkultur (naturism) movement to a general British readership.

== Works ==
- The Second Coming and Other Poems, 1919–1921 (Vienna 1921)
- Britain and Germany. A Frank Discussion instigated by Members of the Younger Generation (1928) editor with Heinz Rocholl
- World Without End: British politics and the younger generation (1932)
- England Herself: Ventures in Rural Restoration (1943)
- Love and Memory: a garland of poems (1960)
- Europe awaits British Ecological Leadership (1972)
- Water Springing from the Ground: an anthology of the writings of Rolf Gardiner (1972) editor Andrew Best

== Family ==
His father was Alan Henderson Gardiner, the Egyptologist. His mother Hedwig, née von Rosen, was Austrian, though with a Roman Catholic father and Swedish-Finnish mother. His sister Margaret was a patron of artists and sculptors, and the mother of the historian Martin Bernal. The composer Henry Balfour Gardiner was his uncle (the folk-song collector George Barnet Gardiner, with whom Balfour Gardiner worked, was not a relative). The conductor John Eliot Gardiner is his son. The artist Howard Hodgkin is another grandson of Florence Hodgkin.

== Legacy ==
Gardiner was a regular writer of letters to The Times. In 2008, he was mentioned in that paper again in a report on the book Youth Culture in Modern Britain, c1920 to c1970 by David Fowler of Clare Hall, Cambridge, who praised "people like Gardiner" as "true cultural subversives – pop stars before pop even existed. In terms of the influence he had on giving Britain's young people a sense of identity, there's no doubt [Gardiner] is just as important as Mick Jagger".

=== The Springhead Trust ===
After Gardiner's death, the family placed the Springhead estate in the care of a trust which was registered as a charity – The Springhead Trust – in 1973. Rosalind Richards, daughter of Rolf and Marabel, was life tenant of the house; after her death in 2016 the charity took on management of the house. The estate hosts children and young people on day trips or longer stays, and is also a venue for weddings and other events.
