= Jorian Jenks =

English farmer, environmentalist and fascist

- Born: Jorian Edward Forwood Jenks; 1889; Oxford, United Kingdom
- Died: August 20, 1963 (aged 73–74)
- Citizenship: British
- Education: Harper Adams Agricultural College
- Alma mater: Balliol College, Oxford
- Known for: Environmentalism pioneer and fascist
- Political party: British Union of Fascists

Jorian Edward Forwood Jenks (1899 – 20 August 1963) was an English farmer, environmentalism pioneer and fascist. He has been described as "one of the most dominant figures in the development of the organic movement".

== Early life ==
Born in Oxford, Jenks was the son of Edward Jenks, a leading expert on jurisprudence, and his second wife. A farmer, Jenks was educated at the Harper Adams Agricultural College and Balliol College, Oxford, whilst he also served in the First World War. After emigrating to New Zealand during the 1920s, Jenks returned to England. After lecturing for a spell Jenks took over his own farm in Angmering, West Sussex. However he was forced to give up his farm due to the slump in agricultural prices and his own chronic asthma. From this point on Jenks was forced to rely on writing as his source of income, penning articles for such journals as Philip Mairet's New English Weekly and Maurice Reckitt's Christendom.

== Pre-war fascism ==
A member of the British Union of Fascists, he was the agricultural advisor to the party. He organised garden parties to raise funds for the BUF, a fairly common technique amongst the party's more affluent and rural supporters. A self-styled 'critic of modern economy', he wrote for the BUF journal Action under the pseudonym 'Vergillius'. He was one of the group's most active members in Surrey, where a particularly active branch existed. He also wrote articles on animal husbandry for the non-BUF journal New Pioneer, an anti-Semitic work founded in late 1938 by John Beckett and Lord Lymington. In 1936 Jenks was picked as candidate for the forthcoming general election for Horsham and Worthing.

Jenks took charge of the agricultural policy of the BUF, seeking to lead Britain to agricultural autarky. He called for import controls and the establishment of an Agricultural Land Bank in order to make farm debt more manageable as well as an Agricultural Corporation to fix prices and fit in with the BUF corporatist economic policy. Landowners who were seen to be misusing their land would also be subject to compulsory purchase, with a Volunteer Land Army established to restore the reclaimed territory. Whilst Jenks' ideas were never put into practice it has been argued that they did affect government policy, as moves towards agricultural self-sufficiency became the cornerstone of policy in the late 1940s whilst earlier initiatives such as the British Empire Economic Conference and Import Duties Act 1932 also borrowed from Jenks' protectionist vision. Similarly the Defence Regulations included DR49 which allowed for compulsory land purchase, whilst the Agriculture Act 1947 allowed for price-fixing as Jenks had suggested.

Although an important member of the BUF Jenks was something of a maverick who disagreed with leader Oswald Mosley on a number of issues. Unlike Mosley, who felt that British society was in rapid decline, Jenks felt that the country was in a slow Spenglerian decay. Neither did he share the BUF leader's unbounded faith in modern science, instead taking a more sceptical stance. Despite these disagreements Jenks had a personal loyalty to Mosley, describing him as having "twice Cobbett's intellect and none of Cobbett's bigotry". He remained a BUF member and in common with most of the leading figures in the group was detained under Defence Regulation 18B in 1940. Indeed, in the run-up to the detentions Mosley's contingency plans in the event that he was imprisoned named Jenks as temporary leader in his absence, although this did not come to pass due to Jenks' own internment. Jenks was initially detained at Latchmere House in the London Borough of Richmond upon Thames for interrogation, before being transferred to Walton Gaol where he was subject to 23-hour lockdown. He was released in 1941 and became a tenant farmer in Seaford, East Sussex.

== Post-war activism ==
After the war he sought to build a 'spiritual ecologism' that would bond man and soil. To this end he joined Lady Eve Balfour's Soil Association, a pro-organic farming group, in 1945. He also joined Rolf Gardiner's Kinship in Husbandry and H. J. Massingham's Council for the Church and Countryside, two other traditionalist rural groups. He argued in favour of organicism, feeling that the quality of food and the health of a nation were inextricably linked. He felt that the key to health was Bergsonian vitalism, but added to this the belief that the decline in food standards would directly precipitate the fall of Western civilisation.

It was with the Soil Association that he reached the widest audience as he edited the group's Mother Earth journal. Whilst the Association had a wide membership Jenks saw it as a vehicle keeping Mosleyism alive in a time before the formation of the Union Movement. Although Jenks remained associated with the Soil Association until his death the group later moved to the left and Jenks' role has subsequently been marginalised. His other main group involvement was in the Rural Reconstruction Association, a group initially founded in 1929 by Quaker Montague Fordham. Jenks served as press secretary for the RRA and edited their journal Rural Economy whilst building up a coterie of former fascists or fascist sympathisers within the group in the shape of ex-BUF members Derek Stuckey and Robert Saunders as well as some former members of the English Mistery. Jenks used his position as editor of the RRA journal to advocate agricultural autarky. Ultimately he did not join the Union Movement. He also helped to produce their None Need Starve document, which offered a new agricultural plan.

Jenks' post-war writings included The Country Year (1946), British Agriculture and International Trade (1948), From the Ground Up: An Outline of the Rural Economy (1950) and The Stuff Man's Made Of: The Positive Approach to Health through Nutrition (1959) which was much more ecological and less fascist than his previous works. Although the organic movement has in general moved away from the politics espoused by Jenks, his influence has been felt as his themes of sustainability, small farming, opposition to the over-reliance on mechanised farming and mistrust of international food trade over local produce remain central. At the suggestion of Rolf Gardiner he sent his work to the former Nazi Agriculture Minister Richard Walther Darré who continued to write on the themes of blood and soil after the war.

== See also ==
- Ecofascism
- History of organic farming
