= William Courtenay =

William Courtenay may refer to:

- William Courtenay (bishop) (1342–1396), archbishop of Canterbury
- William Courtenay, 1st Earl of Devon (1475–1511)
- Sir William Courtenay (1451–1512)
- Sir William Courtenay (1477–1535), MP for Devon
- Sir William Courtenay (died 1557) (c. 1529–1557), de jure 2nd Earl of Devon
- Sir William Courtenay (died 1630) (1553–1630), de jure 3rd Earl of Devon
- Sir William Courtenay, 1st Baronet (1628–1702), de jure 5th Earl of Devon
- Sir William Courtenay, 2nd Baronet (1676–1735), de jure 6th Earl of Devon
- William Courtenay, 1st Viscount Courtenay (1709–1762), de jure 7th Earl of Devon
- William Courtenay, 2nd Viscount Courtenay (1742–1788), de jure 8th Earl of Devon
- William Courtenay, 9th Earl of Devon (1768–1835)
- William Courtenay, 10th Earl of Devon (1777–1859), British aristocrat and politician
- William Courtenay, 11th Earl of Devon (1807–1888)
- John Nichols Thom or William Courtenay (1799–1838), Cornish rebel leader
- William Courtenay (actor) (1875–1933), American stage and film actor
- William Courtenay (filmmaker) (1896–1960), British film maker
- William Courtenay, in 1455, MP for Somerset
- William Courtenay (MP for Fowey) (c. 1582–1603), eldest son of 3rd Earl of Devon, represented Fowey
- William Ashmead Courtenay (1831–1908), mayor of Charleston, South Carolina

== See also ==
- William Courtney (disambiguation)
- Earl of Devon
