= Robert Waller =

Robert Waller may refer to:

- Robert Ferns Waller (1913–2005), poet and ecologist
- Robert James Waller (1939–2017), American novelist
- Robert Waller (pundit) (born 1955), British political analyst
- Robert Waller (Chipping Wycombe MP) (c. 1732–1814), British politician
- Robert Waller (York MP) (died 1698)
- Robert Waller (musician), American rapper and songwriter
