= Ashridge Dining Club =

English political club 1933–1938

The Ashridge Dining Club was a political club set up in 1933 in West London with the object of extending the associations and activities of the Bonar Law College, Ashridge, by discussion over the dinner table. The Bonar Law College had been opened in 1929 by Stanley Baldwin having been presented to the Conservative Party by Mr Urban Broughton as a training college for Conservative workers. It was named as a memorial to Bonar Law, the British Conservative Party politician and Prime Minister, who had died in 1923.

Associated with the College were regional or county circles or clubs; their activities were reported by The Ashridge Journal.

Ordinary membership was open to those who had attended courses at Ashridge, with others being associate members. Membership was by subscription. Meetings took place at York Mansions Restaurant, Petty France, London. The president of the club was Mr Arthur Bryant, editor of the Ashridge Journal and author of "The Spirit of Conservatism"; the founder and chairman was Miss Sheelagh Dumay Kerr (1908–1995). The organising secretary was Mrs A B P Kerr.

Other members of the committee were:

Vice-Presidents Mr L H Sutton, Mr T N Graham, The Principal of Ashridge.

Hon. Secretary Miss E M Soutter

Hon Treasurer Lt. Col. A. H. Burne, D.S.O.

The speakers and subjects discussed by the dining club illustrate some of the political concerns at that time. Meetings continued until the outbreak of the Second World War.

In London there was also the London Ashridge Circle, which arranged dinners at St Ermin's Hotel, Caxton Street, Westminster, and the London Ashridge Club.

Following the fiftieth dinner in 1938 a review of the club was included in the Ashridge Journal on the occasion of Miss Kerr resigning as chairman and Mr W R C Snape taking over.

== Meetings ==
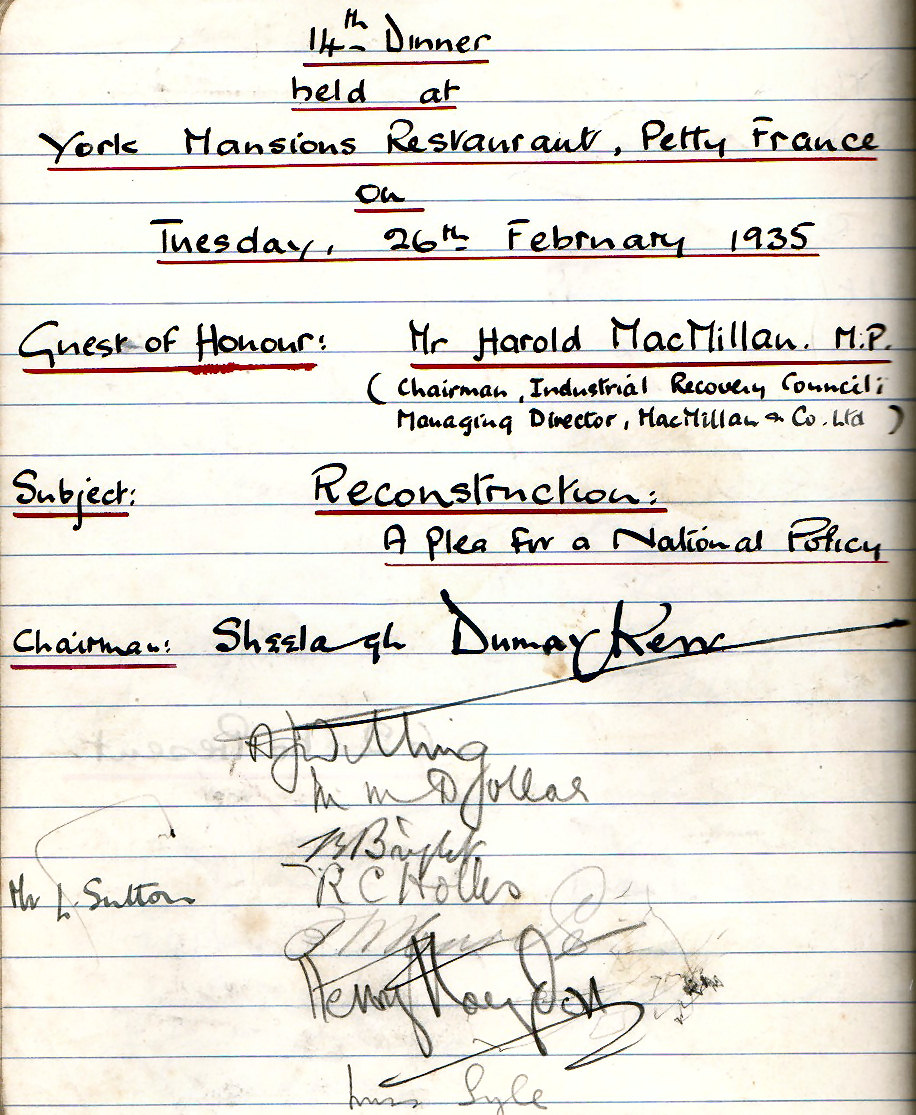
Extract from the Ashridge Dining Club Register

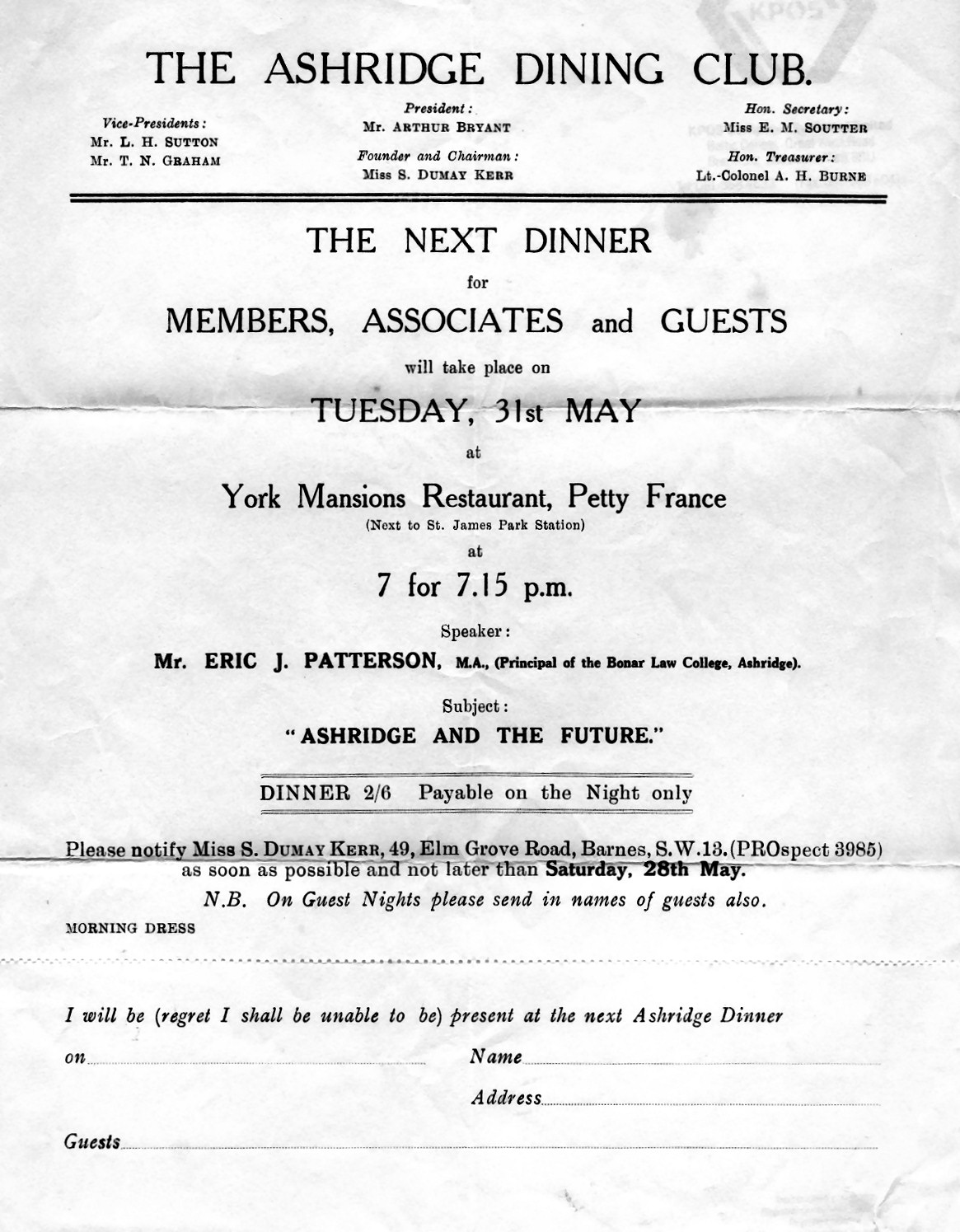
Leaflet

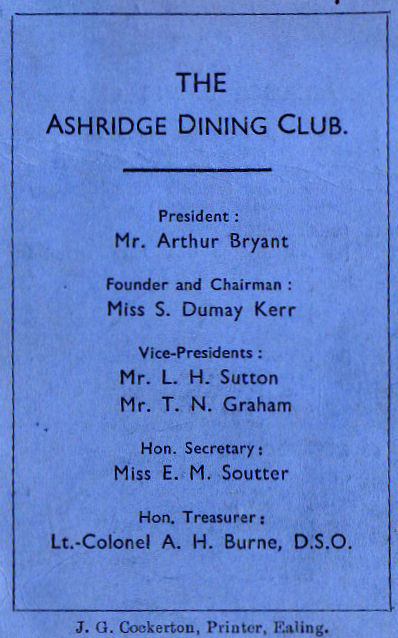
Membership Card

No.	Date	Guest of Honour	Subject
1	4 December 1933	Mr L Sutton	Inaugural Meeting
2	22 January 1934	Mr John Green	Post War Conservatism
3	21 February 1934	Mr Henry Snell	Local Government
4	20 March 1934	Professor F J C Hearnshaw M.A.	Fundamentals of Conservatism
5	17 April 1934	Mr H R Selley J.P. M.P. (Late Chairman, L.C.C. Housing Committee)	Housing & Slum Clearance
6	24 May 1934	Sir John Marriott M.A.	The Empire
7	18 June 1934	Mr Hugh Gilbert R Sellon M.A.	The Future of Conservatism
8	9 July 1934	Commander John Irving R.N. (of the Navy League)	Disarmament
9	19 September 1934	Captain C Waterhouse M.C., M.P.	Unemployment Insurance
10	15 October 1934	Mr Hugh Molson M.P.	The Work of the National Government
11	20 November 1934	Mr G D Amery	Agriculture
12	13 December 1934	Sir Michael O'Dwyer G.C.I.E., K.C.S.I. (formerly Lieut. Governor of the Punjab)	The Future Government of India
13	16 January 1934	Sir A Hamilton Grant K.C.I.E., K.C.S.I. (Chief Commissioner of the North West Frontier Province 1919-22)	The Future Constitution of India
14	26 February 1935	Mr Harold Macmillan M.P. (Chairman Industrial Recovery Council)	Reconstruction: A Plea for a National Policy
15	19 March 1935	Air Commander J A Chamier C.B., C.M.G., D.S.O., O.B.E. (Secretary General of the Air League)	Air Defence
16	30 April 1935	Major-General Sir Reginald Hoskins K.C.B., C.M.G., D.S.O. (Principal of the Bonar Law College)	Italy and Abyssinia
17	30 May 1935	Mr R Cross, M.P., Mrs R Cross	World Affairs: 1910-1935
18	19 June 1935	Mr Douglas Jerrold (Editor of "The English Review")	Peace
19	17 July 1935	Mr Allan Monkhouse, M.I.E.E. (author of 'Moscow 1911-1933'), Mrs Allan Monkhouse	Russia
20	18 September 1935	Mr H G Williams, M.P., Mrs Williams	Dangers of Economic Planning
21	22 October 1935	Sir John Harris (Parliamentary Secretary, The Anti-Slavery & Aborigines Protection Society)	The Present Italo-Abyssinian Dispute
22	28 November 1935	Mr H G R Sellon M.A.	The International Situation
23	19 February 1936	Miss Florence Horsbrugh O.B.E., M.P.	Women's Work at Geneva
24	1 April 1936	Mr J A L Duncan, M.P.	Progress & Prosperity
25	30 April 1936	Dr Vladimir de Korestevelz	Russia & Ukraine
26	20 May 1936	Mr Patrick Donner, M.P.	Some Imperial & Foreign Questions
27	11 June 1936	Lord Mansfield (Imperial Policy Group)	Foreign Affairs
28	9 July 1936	Mr Arthur Bryant	Conservatism
29	29 September 1936	Mr L Sutton (Vice President)	The Demand for Colonies
30	19 October 1936	Dr Fitz Randolph (attache - German Embassy)	
31	30 November 1936	Lord Burghley M.P.	The Political Outlook
32	7 December 1936	Major Cole (The Staff College, Camberley)	Imperial Co-ordination in Defence
33	4 January 1937	Mr Eric Patterson M.A.	The International Situation
34	8 February 1937	Alderman W H Webbe (Leader of the Municipal Reform Party)	The L.C.C. Election
35	11 March 1937	John Boyd Carpenter (Barrister at Law)	The Constitution & the Empire
36	13 April 1937	Mr Bertram B Benas M.A., LL.B	The Law & the Citizen
37	26 May 1937	Mr K W M Pickthorn M.P.	Education & the challenge to democracy
38	22 June 1937	Capt H C Armstrong (Author of 'Grey Wolf', 'Grey Steel' etc.)	The Middle East
39	6 July 1937	Sir Geoffrey Ellis, Bart D.L., J.P., M.P.	Paying our way
40	22 September 1937	Mr C Allport B.A., Mrs Allport	The United States
41	28 October 1937	The Rt Hon. the Viscount Davidson G.C.V.D., C.H., C.B.	Conservatism
42	16 November 1937	Field Marshal Lord Milne G.C.B., G.C.M.G., D.S.O.	Imperial Defence
43	16 December 1937	Mr & Mrs Wentworth-Shields	Imperial Affairs
44	26 January 1938	Mr T N Graham M.C.C. (Vice-President)	The Humour of Politics
45	22 February 1938	Viscountess Davidson	Women in Politics
46	21 March 1938	Mr Douglas Jerrold (Editor of "The English Review")	Spain
47	27 April 1938	The Lord William Scott M.C., M.P.	The Evolution of Dictators
48	31 May 1938	Mr Eric Patterson M.A. (Principal, The Bonar Law College), Mrs Eric Patterson	Ashridge & the future
49	28 June 1938	Mr William Courtenay (Aeronautical correspondent to the "Evening Standard")	Air Defence
50	26 July 1938	Mr H G R Sellon M.A.	Britain & the International Situation
51	26 September 1938	Mr L Sutton	
52	17 November 1938	Mr Anthony Crossley M.P.	Palestine
