= Fran Balkwill =

English scientist children's books author (born 1952)

Fran Balkwill OBE FRS FMedSci
- Born: Frances Rosemary Balkwil; 1952 (age 73–74); London, England
- Education: Surbiton High School
- Alma mater: University of Bristol (BSc); Queen Mary University of London (PhD)
- Occupations: Scientist and author
- Known for: Children's books on scientific topics
- Awards: Michael Faraday Prize (2005)
- Scientific career
- Workplaces: Queen Mary University of London
- Thesis: Investigations into the Nature of Human Acute Leukaemia Using Cell Culture Techniques (1977)
- Doctoral advisor: Gordon Hamilton Fairley

Frances Rosemary Balkwill OBE FRS FMedSci (born 1952) is an English scientist, Professor of Cancer Biology at Queen Mary University of London, and author of children's books about scientific topics.

== Early life and education ==
Balkwill was born in south-west London in 1952, and was educated at Surbiton High School. She obtained a BSc in Cellular Pathology at the University of Bristol and a PhD on leukaemia cell biology in the Medical Oncology Department at St Bartholomew's Hospital supervised by Gordon Hamilton Fairley.

== Career ==
She worked for several years at the ICRF Lincoln's Inn Fields (now Cancer Research UK London Research Institute) on the effect of interferon on cancer. In 2000 she moved to Queen Mary, University of London, where she is Professor of Cancer Biology and Director of the Centre for Translational Oncology in the Cancer Research UK Clinical Cancer Centre.

In addition to her laboratory research, Balkwill has written many children's books about science, illustrated by Mic Rolph, and is Director of Centre of the Cell, a science education centre for children in the new Barts and The London Medical School building in Whitechapel, east London. Her books for children cover a range of topics in biology. For her first book on HIV and Aids, Staying Alive: Fighting HIV/AIDS (2002), Balkwill and Rolph travelled to South Africa to carry out research and to determine the educational needs of local communities. 19,000 free copies of the book were distributed throughout South Africa, funded by the publisher Cold Spring Harbor Laboratory Press.

From 2008 to 2011, Balkwill served as Chairman of the Public Engagement Strategy Committee at the Wellcome Trust. In 2016 she was a judge for the Wellcome Book Prize.

=== Awards and honours ===
In 2008 Balkwill was awarded an Order of the British Empire (OBE).

Balkwill's books for children Cells are Us and Cell Wars won the Royal Society Young People Book Prize in 1991.

She won the European Molecular Biology Organization (EMBO) Award for Communication in the Life Sciences in 2004. She was awarded the Michael Faraday Prize in 2005 "for her outstanding work in communicating the concepts, facts and fascination of science in a way that appeals to children of all ages, backgrounds and nationalities, while at the same time maintaining a distinguished research career". In 2006 she was awarded Fellowship of the Academy of Medical Sciences (FMedSci) for her contributions to and achievements in medicine.

In 2015 she received an Honorary degree from the University of Bristol.

In 2017 she was awarded the Inspiring Leadership in Research Engagement Prize from Cancer Research UK.

In 2021 she received the Beetlestone Award, recognising her leadership and legacy in the field of informal science learning.

In 2024, she was elected a Fellow of the Royal Society (FRS).

== Personal life ==
Balkwill has two children, Jessica and Barnaby. She has 5 grandchildren Sabrina, Esme, Casper, Balthazar and Aurelius.
