= Worcestershire Farmers Limited =

Cooperative

- Type: Agricultural cooperative Producer cooperative
- Industry: Agriculture, commerce, retail, food supply
- Founded: 1919
- Defunct: 1964
- Successor: Midland Shires Farmers
- Headquarters: Worcester, United Kingdom of Great Britain and Ireland
- Area served: Worcestershire
- Key people: Hugh W Dixon, Thomas Bernard Davies
- Services: Agricultural goods producer and retailer, foodstuffs supplier, fuel retailer
- Members: 2,571 in 1957

Worcestershire Farmers Limited (WFL) was an agricultural cooperative society, which served the farmers of Worcestershire for much of the Twentieth Century. It was unusual in that it both supplied its members with inputs for agricultural production, including feed-stuffs, seeds and fuel, while at the same time packing, distributing and marketing their produce. A combination that prompted Sir Frederick Brundrett, chairman of the Agricultural Central Co-operative Association, to write in 1958 that it was not only unique in England but probably in Europe as well.

== Early years ==
Worcestershire Farmers Limited (WFL) was established in 1919 as part of a wave of new agricultural cooperatives founded with the active encouragement of the Agricultural Organisation Society after the end of the First World War. The decision to establish the WFL was taken by members of the executive committee of the Worcestershire county National Farmers’ Union (NFU) at a meeting held in Worcester in August 1919. A nine-person provisional committee was established under the chairmanship of Hugh W. Dixon, with its members drawn from the various local NFU branches throughout the county. From the beginning, this established a tight link between the county NFU and WFL which was to persist throughout its existence. Annual meetings were always held at the Farmer's Club in Worcester and the cooperative's chairman was always a senior member of the executive of the county NFU.

After they returned home from the meeting in Worcester, members of the provisional committee convened local NFU branch meetings to encourage farmers to become shareholders in the new cooperative. Their efforts seem to have met with mixed results. The poor attendance at one meeting on 14 October 1919 at the Star Hotel in Tenbury Wells was excused by the fact that there was a busy market at the time, although it was also thought that the reluctance of some within a profession known for its high degree of individualism to engage in a form of organisation more associated with socialism played a role. However, at another better attended meeting at the same venue a few weeks later the assembled farmers showed more enthusiasm and afterwards it was reported that there had been 400 applications for the £1 shares which had a prospective dividend yield of 6%. After 100 further members joined, following another gathering held in Worcester on 17 November, which was addressed by a prominent figure from the agricultural cooperative movement, Percy Whiteley of Preston Farmers Limited, it was reported that altogether £20,000 of share capital had been pledged and this was deemed sufficient to allow WFL to be officially established at the end of the month. The first general manager and secretary, E. H. Davies was appointed and operations, which had begun from a small desk in the corner of the Farmer's Union Office in the city, soon moved to the cooperative's own premises at 59 Broad Street, Worcester. Trading began on 17 January 1920 and the first corn and seed traveller, Mr F. Golledge, was employed. With such a small staff, the management committee inevitably had to play a full role in the day-to-day affairs of the new society. They not only handled matters of administration but also actively sought business, for which they were allowed to claim the cost of railway fares and ‘where absolutely necessary’ for the hire of a motor car.

During the war years, rising agricultural costs had by and large been offset by an increase in the amount that farmers received for their products. Once the war ended, however, there arose a widespread fear in the agricultural community that food prices would fall, especially if an expected decline in shipping rates again opened up the British market to competition from abroad. The new agricultural cooperative societies, such as WFL, aimed to strengthen the position of the farmers by removing middlemen from the supply chain. WFL would bulk-buy items such as seeds, feeding stuffs and fertilisers directly from the manufacturers and supply them at cost price to its members plus a 10% operation charge, which would cover such things as carriage and bags for the delivery of clover and grass seeds. Not only would this reduce the price of inputs for the farmers — it was reported that they could save up to 30 shillings a ton on linseed cattle cake — but they also stood to benefit from the annual redistribution of any trading surplus, which would be returned to members in direct proportion to the amount of business they had done with the cooperative. This applied not just to buying but also to selling, because the cooperative also intended to help its members market their produce although initially this was to be limited to fruit and vegetables.

During the First World War the Worcestershire Fruit and Vegetable Society, originally founded in Upton-on-Severn as the Upton Produce Committee, had been established to provide a constant flow of fresh produce to both its wholesale market in Angel Street, Worcester and to the canteens of a number of large Birmingham factories. This was not only probably the first attempt at cooperative marketing in England but in the process it also contributed to the establishment of the concept of workplace catering. By 1920, however, the Worcestershire Fruit and Vegetable Society was in dire financial straits and the WFL ‘to help the co-operative ideal‘ agreed to step in to save it, offering its members 15 shillings in the pound on their share capital. By taking over the Society, WFL acquired control of its Worcester market and this helped strengthen its balance sheet which, in its first year of trading, showed a healthy profit of £1,336 on a turnover of £109,546.

After this successful beginning, the early 1920s were difficult trading years for WFL. The society staff worked hard to build sufficient confidence in the cooperative to attract new members but it was not until 1928 that the board was able to recommend a payment of interest on share capital and not until the following year, 1929, that they were able to pay a bonus on the trading surplus at the rate of two pence in the pound. In 1931 the first chairman, Hugh Dixon, died to be replaced by Frank Smith of Yielding Tree, Clent but the change of leadership brought little appreciable change in fortunes. Profits slowly rose to £2,464 in 1935 and £3,383 in 1937 before falling again in 1939. Dividends never reached the 6% promised at the foundation of the society, but the bonus paid did increase to nine pence in the pound on all corn products bought in 1937, most likely as part of an effort to attract more farmers to trade with the society.

== Post Second World War expansion ==
The Second World War brought new challenges for WFL as thousands of acres of pasture were ploughed up for grain and every cottage garden became the home of pigs and poultry. The staff of WFL, like the rest of the country, struggled with shortages and rationing, eking out the little that was available among the many members who needed it. Nonetheless, after the war the renewed emphasis on domestic food production was to provide the base for a major expansion in the cooperatives' business. First, in 1946, came the purchase of the St John's Egg Packing Station in Worcester. Here, 370,700 eggs were graded every week before being sent out to shops in Worcester, Malvern, Kidderminster and the Midlands generally. Two years later, in order to supply the northern half of the county and parts of Birmingham, a second egg packing plant with some of the most advanced grading machinery in the country was established on the Stourport Road in Kidderminster. By 1958 this was dealing with 16.5 million eggs per annum and had total sales of £591,000.

Concurrent with this expansion in the egg trade, the corn department built its first central depot at 23 The Butts in Worcester. In 1946 the Clockhouse in Tenbury Wells was also acquired and developed into a corn and fertiliser store with a general farm supplies shop, dealing in feeding stuffs for anything from cattle to canaries. This was followed in 1950 by the opening of a depot in Kidderminster where, in addition to the normal agricultural products, there was also a large seed cleaning plant. A garage and workshop was also established on Henshall Road in Worcester and by 1958 the society had 34 distinctly liveried lorries on the road. During this period, WFL also took over the role of fuel distributor for the Regent Oil Company in the county, running four tankers supplying diesel and other fuels direct to farms from riverside depots.

The leadership of WFL also changed as the Second World War came to an end. Frank Smith was succeeded as chairman by A.B. Quinney of Frankley in 1945 and then by J.H. Wythes. At the same time there were also significant changes in the administration of the society. E. H. Davies, who had been manager of WFL since its inception, retired at the beginning of 1947 and in March 1948 J.B. Alexander was appointed, first as the manager of the corn department and then as E.H. Davies’ successor as secretary and general manager of the business as a whole. In 1952 Thomas Bernard Davies of Chadwich Manor Farm, near Rubery, Bromsgrove took over the reins of the chairmanship. He had served on the board of WFL since 1944 and was to remain as chairman until WFL amalgamated with Warwickshire Farmers Limited in 1964. Always a strong believer in cooperation in farming, in a newspaper interview in 1958 he recalled how he had only become a member of WFL when he found a book of forgotten shares in an old roll-top desk which had been left at Chadwich when he took over the farm in 1924: 'I was going through the drawers with the previous tenant when I came across the book. It was dusty and dog-eared and he advised me to throw it away. Those were the bad days for farmers and he told me the society had never paid any interest on its shares. In spite of that I decided to have them transferred to my name and to keep them.’ Under the chairmanship of T.B. Davies the post war expansion of WFL continued apace. In 1954 a new depot, Bridge House, was established beside the river at Upton-on-Severn to serve members in the southern part of the county, and on 1 January 1957, a corn and seed depot was opened at the Smithfield fruit and vegetable market in Evesham to perform a similar service for farmers in that area. The market in Evesham had been purchased by WFL from a private company in 1951 and it rapidly expanded, so that by 1964 it had more than tripled its pre-takeover turnover to over £300,000 per annum. On 30 July 1956 a permanent premises for the Worcester fruit and vegetable market also opened at a specially built facility on Hylton Road in Worcester,

However, by far the most ambitious project at this time was the construction of a new headquarters for the society in Worcester on the site of its previous depot at 23 The Butts. Indeed, its opening on 4 September 1958, by Sir James Turner, the President of the National Farmers' Union, even warranted the production of a special four-page supplement in local newspapers. The new premises, which have taken two and a half years to build at a cost of over £250,000, was a distinctive three-storey red brick building. It was constructed on concrete piles sunk 30 feet into the ground and had a ground floor raised four feet above road level to protect it from flooding by the nearby River Severn. Inside, as well as an office block for the cooperatives’ administrative staff and a retail store, there was a mill for the manufacture of cattle, poultry and pig foods. The idea of building a mill to produce animal feedstuffs had first been proposed in 1953 and it seems to have been driven by a desire to both create a more assured market for grain produced by the cooperative's members and to have greater control over the quality of the feedstuffs it supplied to them. Ambitions which were to lead Turner to remark at the opening of the building that 'here we have integration in the fullest sense; that is integration of farming operations, business enterprise, and direct service.'

The expansion in services was matched by a growth in the membership of the society which expanded rapidly from 846 in 1948 to 2,571 in 1957. During this decade, sales also increased sharply from £391,642 to £2,478,100, while the total of bonuses and interest paid back to members amounted to well over £300,000. This rapid growth led Sir Frederick Brundrett to state at the time of the opening of the new Worcester premises that ‘There is no other society in England, or to my knowledge in Europe, which provides such a wide service. providing, as it does, on the one hand the needs of production such as feeding stuffs, fertilisers, seeds, fuel oils, etc….. and on the other markets for grain, eggs, fruit and vegetables.’

The building of the new premises in Worcester did not stop the society's expansion. After a protracted debate within the borough council about the conditions to be applied to the lease, on 1 January 1963 WFL took over the loss-making Worcester cattle market. This was quickly sublet to Worcester Livestock Auctions, a collective of three local auctioneers who had previously operated separately. Within a year, alterations had been made to the animal pens in the market and a new canteen built for its clients at a cost of £2,500. In 1963 a large new egg packing station opened in Kidderminister, replacing the two previously operating in the same town and Worcester. Serving 800 egg producers across the county it was fully automated and capable of packing 750,000 eggs a week. In the same year a second £95,000 mill for animal feeds also opened in a converted hangar at a former RAF airfield at Defford in Worcestershire. Capable of producing twenty tons an hour it was judged to be one of the most modern in Europe with a main control panel which ‘looks like a device for launching space rockets’. The exhibition at its opening, however, was marred by such stormy weather that the tent erected for the directors was hurled 30 feet from its wooden base and they had to be 're-housed' in the mill office.

At the time of the opening of the new Worcester premises in 1958, Sir Frederick Brundrett had written that 'an outstanding feature of this successful organisation is the manner in which the society's strong committee of management has diligently sought to serve the interests of the farmers’ of Worcestershire rather than extend the activities of the society into neighbouring counties.' The continued expansion at the beginning of the 1960s, however, was to bring a change of heart. In May 1964 WFL had opened its first branch outside Worcestershire at Chipping Norton in Oxfordshire but already the directors were making more ambitious plans. A proposal was made that WFL should merge with the neighbouring Warwickshire Farmers Limited to create one of the six largest agricultural cooperatives in England, with a total membership of 5,800 and a turnover approaching £6,000,000. This seems to have received widespread backing from the Worcestershire farmers but was openly questioned in Warwickshire where a director of the county NFU tried to reassure his colleagues that it was not just a case of the smaller Warwickshire Farmers Limited being ‘swallowed up’ by the much bigger WFL but rather ‘a happy marriage of equal partners’. Eventually, a joint meeting of WFL and Warwickshire Farmers Limited members, held at Stratford-upon-Avon in Warwickshire on 28 October 1964, unanimously confirmed the merger of the two cooperatives. The new combined society, which was to be called Midland Shire Farmers, was scheduled to operate from January 1, 1965, under the chairmanship of T.B. Davies of WFL.

== Successor Organisations ==
Between 1919 and 1964 WFL grew to be one of the main agricultural cooperative societies in England. Its successor Midland Shire Farmers eventually became part of the even larger Countrywide Farmers, which remained headquartered in Worcestershire at Evesham. Demutualised in 1999 when it became Countrywide Farmers plc, this new company went into administration in 2018, bringing to an end a century-old tradition of successful agricultural cooperation.
