= Guest Night =

1938 British TV series

Guest Night is a British television programme broadcast by the BBC from 1938 until the start of the Second World War in September 1939, with an additional set of episodes made in 1946. According to a contemporary account, it was similar to a radio programme called Men Talking.

The series was hosted by A. G. Street, with each episode featuring a meeting of guests from a particular field. The first episodes included travellers and explorers, followed by town-planners and architects.

None of the episodes still exist, as television recording was not possible at the time.
