= William Courtney =

William Courtney may refer to:

- William Leonard Courtney (1850–1928), English author
- William Harrison Courtney (born 1944), American diplomat
- William Prideaux Courtney (1845–1913), English biographer

== See also ==
- William Courtenay (disambiguation)
