= Margaret Robertson Watt =

Canadian author and activist

Margaret Rose Robertson Watt MBE
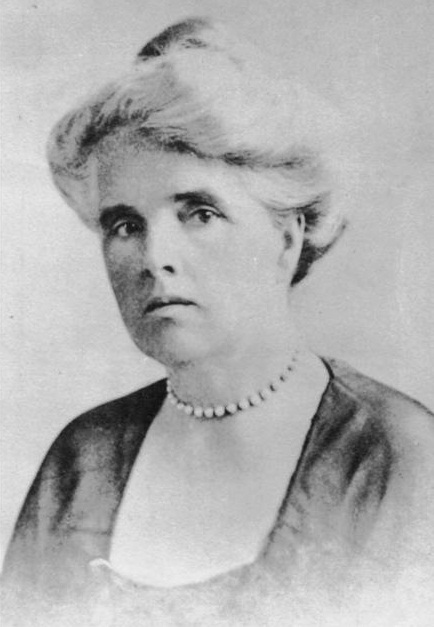
- Mrs Alfred Watt, one of the founders of the Women's Institutes in Great Britain.
- Born: June 4, 1868; Collingwood, Ontario, Canada
- Died: November 29, 1948; Montreal, Quebec, Canada
- Education: University of Toronto
- Spouse: Alfred Tennyson Watt

Margaret Robertson Watt MBE (June 4, 1868 – November 29, 1948) was a Canadian writer, editor and activist. She was noted for her energy and commitment, and advocated for the collective influence of women working together. She is known to members of Women's Institutes in the United Kingdom for introducing the concepts and practices of the Canadian Women's Institute movement to Britain in 1914. She is remembered internationally as one of the founding members of the Associated Country Women of the World (ACWW) in 1933.

== Personal life ==
Madge Robertson Watt was born Margaret Rose Robertson in Collingwood, Ontario, on June 4, 1868. Her father was Henry Robertson Q.C. (1840-1923), son of John and Catherine Robertson of Hamilton. Her mother Bethia (1844-1893) was the daughter of John and Margaret Climie Rose of Bradford. Both parents were Canadian-born children of Scottish emigrants.

Her forebears had all emigrated to Simcoe District (now County), Ontario, in the years following the War of 1812, when the land was opened to pioneer farming These Scottish pioneers contributed to Madge's genetic makeup, evidenced by her traits of stamina, determination, and persistence. These, combined with her ability to draw women together to develop and advance a common cause, led to her future success as an inspired organizer of Women's Institutes, following the founding of that organization by Adelaide Hoodless in 1897.

She liked "Madge" as the short name for Margaret and used it all her life. She also liked short hair and wore hers that way in spite of the fashion in her early life that dictated otherwise.

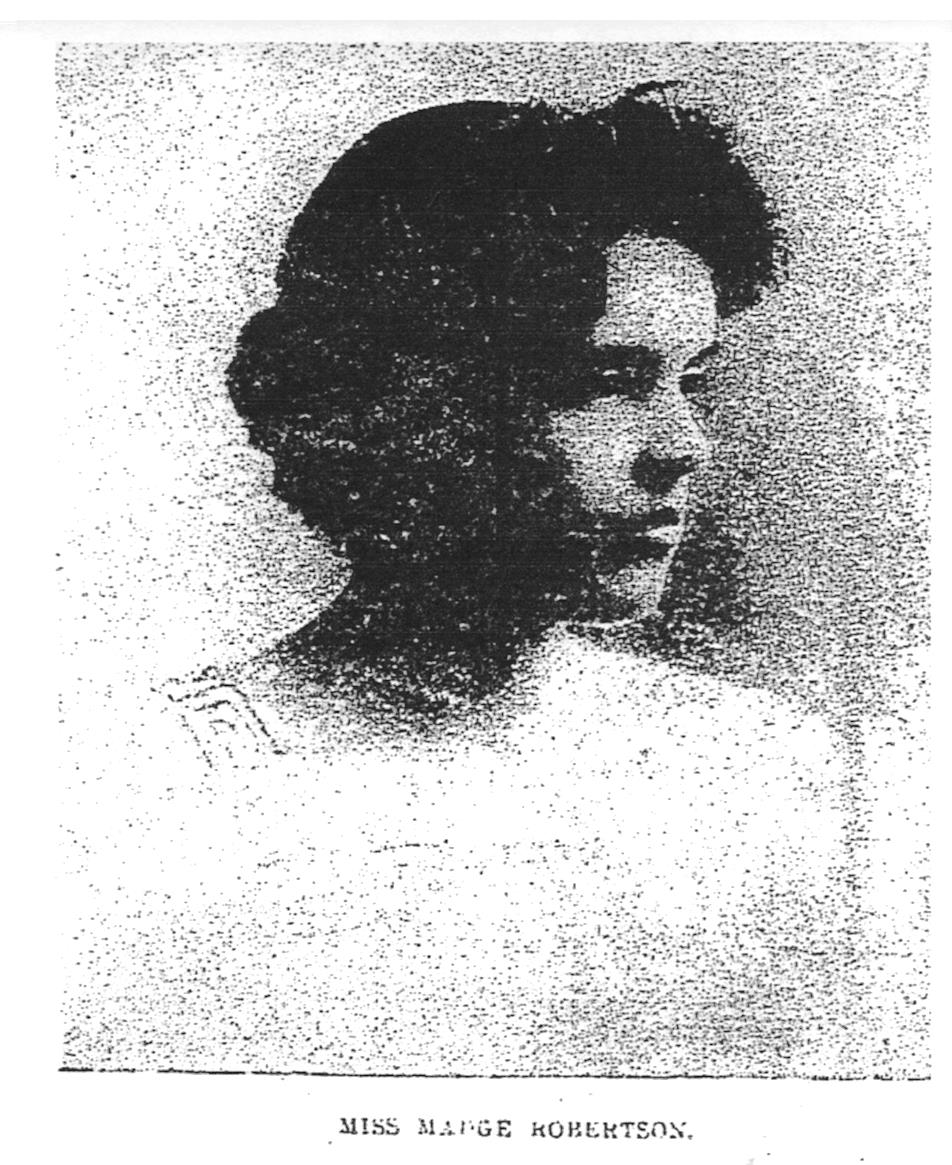
Madge Robertson, writer, 1893

Madge graduated from the University of Toronto, where she was a member of Kappa Alpha Theta, in 1890. She was one of the first women to be granted a Master of Arts degree. She earned her living as a Canadian writer, editor, and reviewer in the years between 1890 and 1907. Writing under the name of Madge Robertson, she had many articles published by newspapers and magazines, such as the University of Toronto's The Varsity, the Ladies Pictorial Weekly (she also edited it in 1892), The Globe, some USA titles, and the British Columbia Victoria Times. Ambrose & Hall (2007) hail her as an example of a New Woman because, in her writings, she used ideas from emerging feminist thought. She also recognized that most women saw such ideas as being distant from basic family life and ties.

Although a believer in marriage reform, Madge became engaged to, and then married, Alfred Tennyson Watt, M.D., and bore two sons, Henry Robertson (Robin) in 1896 and Hugh Sholto (Sholto) in 1906. She continued her writing in William Head, Metchosin, British Columbia, where they lived while Dr Watt carried out his duties as chief medical officer, Superintendent of Quarantine for the Province of British Columbia. She joined the Metchosin Women's Institute in 1909, wrote pamphlets to entice agriculture settlers to Vancouver Island, and became a member of the Senate of the University of British Columbia. She was also appointed to the first Advisory Board of the British Columbia Women's Institute.

When Dr Watt died suddenly in 1913, Madge took her two sons to England to complete their education. When World War I broke out, many men left their jobs to join the army and navy, so farm and village women had to do the work they had left behind. Madge realized that a concerted, effective agricultural effort was needed in the country and set about spreading the concepts of Women's Institutes.

== Early Women's Institutes in the U.K. ==
Jane Robinson, in A Force to be reckoned with, noted that Adelaide Hoodless had already visited London and spoken about Women's Institutes, the movement she had founded after her son died from drinking contaminated milk. The first group of women met together in the Ontario town of Stoney Creek, Canada in 1897. Other WIs formed in Ontario soon after, especially as Hoodless was a good speaker and could inspire women to set up their own small WIs . In 1899, Lady Aberdeen, wife of a former Governor General of Canada, welcomed Hoodless to England and was enthusiastic about the usefulness of such a women's organization. But English women were not willing to take it on at that time.

The ideas around Women's Institutes needed the right time and place to take root. With World War I already underway, Madge Watt had the determination and stamina to keep bringing WI concepts to everyone's attention until the Agricultural Organisation Society (AOS) began offering funds. This initiative enabled a group of women to organize in 1915 as the first Women's Institute. They lived in and about the village of Llanfair PG in Wales.

With funds from the Agricultural Organisation Society, Madge went on to help a number of WIs to organize quickly, following the success of the Welsh group. By the end of World War I, the movement was credited with being a strong force in agriculture, having increased the food supply from 35% to 60% of the country's requirements.

Madge was a good speaker and able to put her points across clearly. Audience members sometimes said they felt as if she was speaking directly to each individual. Madge continued encouraging women to set up and work within Women's Institutes and helped train workers to carry on the administrative side of the organization. As a superlative organizer, she helped set up the first 100 Institutes and was Chief Organizer under the Board of Agriculture.

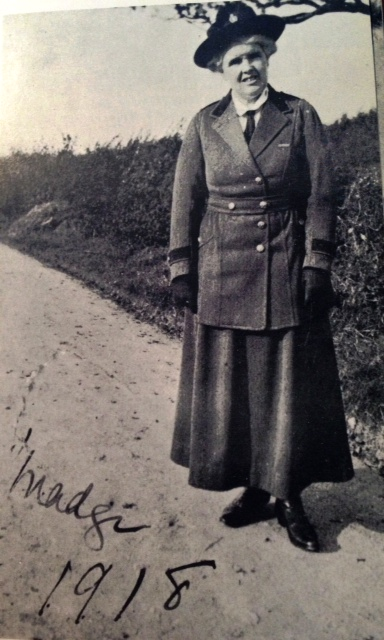
As Chief Organizer of WIs in Great Britain during World War I, Mrs Watt helped bring over 100 Institutes into being within three years. In this picture, she wears the uniform for Voluntary County Organizers.

She developed and presented the first Women's Institute School in Sussex in 1918. The School's aim was to interest and begin to train good administrative staff who would continue to bring on new groups. She wanted women to realize their own talents and skills for this type of work. In her history of women leaders of the ACWW, Jean M. Robinson reproduced an excerpt from the first Women's Institute School manual, which may have been the words that Madge actually spoke:

I always tell them, in getting out a programme, to remember these points:

Something to hear. Something to see. Something to do.

This provides for everyone. I explain the glorious unity of the Women's Institute Organization, and then how the home is the beginning of all that the country will be.

The ideas behind WI 'schools' helped sustain the training of leaders and administrators, although the short courses ran for many years on a shoestring. In 1917,Gertrude Denman accepted the presidency of the newly established National Federation of Woman's Institutes (NFWI) in the United Kingdom. She, like Madge Watt, was a strong believer in women's abilities to develop leadership and organizational skills. In the years after World War 1, the WI offerings gradually changed into adult education short courses to meet their members' needs. These overnight educationals became well attended once WW2 had ended but the demand for them out-grew the accommodation that could be hired to present them.

Jane Robinson described the trials and tribulations that the NFWI experienced while finding, and funding, a permanent home for their popular short courses. When Lady Denman retired in 1946 as the NFWI President, she agreed to the members' proposal to name their new building Denman College, to mark her on-going support for continuing education for all WI members who wished it. Denman College's success has, in a way, its beginning in the First Women's Institute school in 1918, designed and presented by Madge Watt. Like Denman, Madge often expressed her faith in women's abilities to learn and to use their knowledge to help themselves, their families and their communities.

On Madge's return to British Columbia in 1919, she became involved with British Columbia Women's Institutes and was again appointed to the Women's Institute Advisory Board, this time as president. Madge organized the first British Columbia Women's Institute Provincial Convention. She ensured that, from 1924, delegates to the convention rather than government appointees would constitute future Boards.

== ACWW: International organization for rural women ==
Madge belonged to a number of women's organizations from time to time, including the International Council of Women. From 1919 on, she talked up the idea of an international organization of rural women. From her research, she knew rural women around the world had many of the same problems, and that these were different from urban women's problems.

The International Council of Women thought their organization could have a rural women's branch and encouraged its formation. Madge, with others, thought through the implications and eventually decided that a truly independent body was needed. Although a great deal of talk and some personality clashes caused difficulties around this idea, Madge was noted for being able to keep her train of thought and talk above the hubbub. She worked with the International Council of Women's president, Lady Aberdeen, and with its general secretary, Elsie Zimmern, to organize a first international conference of rural women in 1929.

The resulting conference was held in London, England, and provided opportunities for rural women to articulate their views and find commonality across many countries. Many of the same women met again in 2 years' time to continue planning an international organization. In 1933, representatives of 28 agriculture-related women's groups met in Stockholm, Sweden, to consolidate work done at previous meetings. They agreed on the official name for their new world-wide organization for rural women and also agreed on methods of financing, an important part of assuring their future independence.

Thus, The Associated Countrywomen of the World was launched at Stockholm, Sweden. A famous photograph of Madge showed her standing beside a blackboard at this conference with the title of the organization written in English, French, German and Swedish. Madge became its first president and remained in that position until she retired in 1947. In 1936, she traveled around the world and visited many Women's Institutes in a number of countries. Elizabeth Smart, who became a writer in later years, accompanied Madge as her companion and secretary.

ACWW logo

Madge cooperated and collaborated with many women to dream the dream of an international rural women's organization. She had good ideas that could help the organization become known to women in many countries. These ideas could become expensive, such as the writing, editing and production of an ACWW magazine, The Countrywoman. To help this idea happen quickly, she persuaded her son Sholto to use his skills as a journalist to edit the first few issues. When the nascent organization could not afford to publish an expensive version, The Countrywoman appeared in a smaller, less costly format. Because it filled a need, publication of the magazine has continued and is a part of ACWW media today. The organization also needed a logo, so Madge persuaded her older son Robin, who was an artist, to design the ACWW badge. In 1936, he created the well-known logo, depicted as the 4 compass points, with 2 green circles symbolizing friendship, surrounded by green, the 'carpet' of the Earth.

Although Madge Watt had begun her adult career as the writer, Madge Robertson, she never wrote her own story. She was not a person who gathered things for herself. Except for a short period following World War 1, she lived on very little money and moved from one set of rented quarters to another. Over the years, Madge wrote many letters to her younger sister Katie describing her work and travels but did not ask her to keep these. Had the letters, postcards and notes been saved, they would have represented a useful record. Another disappointment to those hoping for contemporary records lies in Elizabeth Smart's published diaries in which Smart wrote only a small amount about the happenings, places and people she met on the tour around the world with Madge Watt. The first detailed biography was published in 2015. Author L.M. Ambrose had to employ sophisticated detective skills to obtain the comprehensive material discussed in the book.

Madge Watt lived in Victoria, British Columbia, during World War II and then lived with son Sholto in Montreal, where she died aged eighty on November 30, 1948. In accord with family wishes, a plain marker was placed on her grave.

The Federation of Women's Institutes of Canada has since replaced this marker with a stone bearing the ACWW logo and a commemorative message.

== Legacy and influence ==
Madge was appointed a Member of the Order of British Empire by King George V in 1919 for her work in helping establish Women's Institutes in the United Kingdom.

With others, Madge founded the Associated Country Women of the World in 1933 to take the concepts to other countries. She recognized that a number of other countries had organizations somewhat similar to the Women's Institutes but, in many cases, these groups required stronger leadership and/or clearer goals. The Women's Institute mission and goals appealed to them, so the women of these countries joined together under the auspices of the Associated Countrywomen of the World and spread the movement around the world.

Madge advocated for women’s leadership and supported efforts to help women realize their potential. She did not present herself as the sole founder of the Associated Country Women of the World (ACWW) or as a founder of the Women's Institutes. Known for her communication skills and strong personality, she sometimes overshadowed other members. The development of the ACWW relied on contributions from several individuals, including Mrs. Godfrey Drage (Finance) and Miss Elsie Zimmern (Secretary) from 1927 on.

She received the Order of Agricultural Merit conferred by the governments of France and Belgium. Jean M. Robinson reports that she gained the cooperation of French and Belgian women in spite of their aversion to sharing recipes with anyone, not even their best friends.

Under the name 'Mrs Alfred Watt', the Canadian government honoured Madge and the ACWW by issuing a Canadian postage stamp in 1959. The stamp, designed by Helen Fitzgerald Bacon, depicts a kneeling woman tending a green tree surmounted by a globe. Forming the border on three sides are the words, 'Associated Country Women of the World Union Mondiale des Femmes Rurale'.

In 1958, the Ontario Government honoured Madge and the Associated Country Women of the World by installing a plaque at the front of the small house in which people thought she had been born in Collingwood.

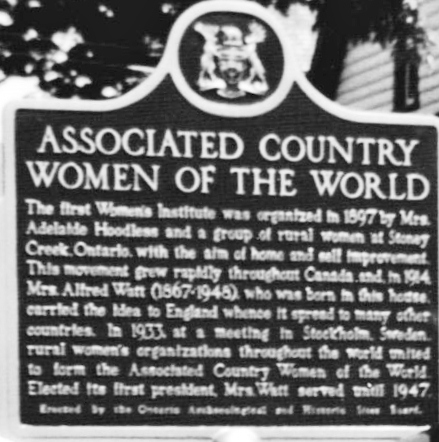
Long-lost Associated Country Women of the World plaque formerly installed outside the Collingwood house thought to be Madge's 1868 birthplace.

At a square metre in size, this handsome plaque was somewhat overpowering in appearance, compared to the modest building behind it. The home owner asked that it be installed in a more appropriate place. It was taken down and stored, but later could not be located. In 1990, a new plaque dedicated to the Associated Country Women of the World was placed near the Collingwood Museum. This plaque disappeared after being damaged. A replacement plaque installed several years later on the grounds of that Museum is still displayed.

Another plaque that played a disappearing act was installed in the middle of the Peace Bridge between Canada and the United States of America in 1936. Following the ACWW Third World Conference held in Washington, the delegates went to the Bridge and held an unveiling ceremony complete with a speech by Madge Watt. The plaque was dedicated to the rural women of Canada and the United States of America. In the 1950s, it was taken down when bridge repairs were undertaken but was then misplaced. Members of the Federation of Women's Institutes of Ontario were eventually successful in finding it and having it re-installed and re-dedicated at the ACWW 23rd Triennial Conference in June, 2001. The ceremony included a re-enactment of Madge's 1936 speech.

British Columbia WI historian Ruth Fenner notes that the Associated Country Women of the World now have non-governmental status at the United Nations and that ACWW representatives speak at international meetings held to decide how rural families can be helped. The ACWW's current UN status is entirely in keeping with Madge's insistence that women should make their own rules, rather than conforming to those set by men. The resulting strength of the ACWW organization lies in its emphasis on women's wellbeing through education and learning, resulting in the wellbeing of their families and thus of the nation in which they live.

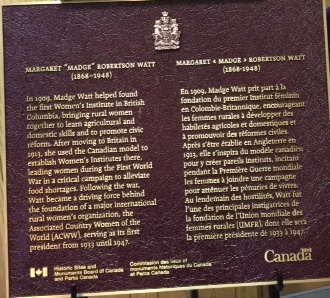
The British Columbia Women's Institutes unveiled a plaque at Colwood, BC, on August 14, 2015, eight years after the Canadian Government formally recognized Madge Watt's work.

Margaret Robertson Watt was named a Person of National Historic Significance by the Canadian government in 2007. A plaque honoring this designation was unveiled at Colwood, British Columbia on August 14, 2015.

Several plantings keep Madge's memory green:

1. a flowering crabapple tree in Beacon Hill Park, Victoria, Vancouver Island,
2. an avenue of lime trees in the grounds of Denman College (the National Federation Of Women's Institutes' short-stay residential college), Oxfordshire, paid for by donations by WI members,
3. a memorial picnic shelter in the International Peace Gardens near the Canada–US border, erected by the Manitoba Women's Institutes.

As author Jane Robinson has stated: "It is clear that at certain periods in its history the Women's Institute appears to have lost its way. No doubt there are problems ahead. But it was never in danger of collapsing, and it won’t for a very long time because, at its core, working quietly and behind the scenes, are the women for whom and by whom it was created... supportive ‘sisters’ are still meeting together in villages and towns across the country to make the world a better place."

She believed in women working on common goals, both locally and internationally as well as supporting women working together, their rights to higher education, their access to careers, and their opportunities to express their individuality through use of their skills and talents.
