= Molly Mahood =

British literary scholar (1919–2017)

Professor Molly Mahood
- Born: Molly Maureen Mahood; 17 June 1919; Wimbledon, London, England
- Died: 14 February 2017 (aged 97)
- Title: Professor of English Literature
- Awards: Rose Mary Crawshay Prize, British Academy (2009)

Academic background
- Education: Surbiton High School
- Alma mater: King's College, London

Academic work
- Discipline: Literary criticism
- Institutions: St Hugh's College, Oxford; University of Ibadan; University of Dar es Salaam; University of Kent at Canterbury

Molly Maureen Mahood (17 June 1919 – 14 February 2017) was a British literary scholar, whose interests ranged from Shakespeare to postcolonial African literature. She taught at St Hugh's College, Oxford (1947–1954), the University of Ibadan in Nigeria (1954–1963), the University of Dar es Salaam in Tanzania (1963–1967), and the University of Kent at Canterbury (1967–1979).

== Early life and education ==
The daughter of James Mahood, CBE, assistant paymaster-general, Molly Mahood was born on 17 June 1919 in Wimbledon, London, England. She was educated at Surbiton High School, an all-girls private school in Kingston upon Thames, London. She studied English at King's College, London, and graduated with a first-class honours degree in 1941. She and her fellow students were evacuated to Bristol because of the increasing threat of bombs during the Second World War. She continued her studies and completed a Master of Arts (MA) degree with a dissertation on 17th-century comedy.

== Academic career ==
From 1947 to 1954, Mahood was a Fellow of St Hugh's College, Oxford, then an all-female college of the University of Oxford. She then moved to Nigeria where she became professor of English at the University of Ibadan. Moving to Tanzania, she held the Chair of English at the University of Dar es Salaam from 1963 to 1967. She returned to England and was appointed Professor of English Literature at the University of Kent at Canterbury. Having retired in 1979, she was made Professor Emeritus by Kent and she maintained her links with the university into old age.

Mahood taught at four universities in three countries. Notable former students of hers include Robert Mugabe (President of Zimbabwe), Abiola Irele (Nigerian literary scholar), and Wole Soyinka (Nobel prizewinner).

== Later life ==
In retirement, Mahood studied for and completed a degree in biological sciences.

Mahood died on 14 February 2017, aged 97. Her funeral was held on 3 March 2017 at Clayton Wood Natural Burial Ground near Hassocks, Sussex, England.

== Honours ==
In 1972, Mahood was selected to give the Annual Shakespeare Lecture at the British Academy, the United Kingdom's national academy for the humanities and social sciences. In 2009, she was awarded the Rose Mary Crawshay Prize by the British Academy for The Poet as Botanist. In July 2010, she was awarded an honorary Doctor of Letters (DLitt) degree by the University of Kent.

== Selected works ==
- Poetry and Humanism. London: Cape. 1950.
- Shakespeare's Wordplay. London: Methuen Publishing. 1957.
- Joyce Cary's Africa. London: Methuen. 1964. ISBN 978-0416223200.
- "1972 Annual Shakespeare Lecture - Unblotted Lines: Shakespeare at Work" (PDF). Proceedings of the British Academy (58): 163–176. 1974.
- The Colonial Encounter: A Reading of Six Novels. London: Rex Collings. 1977. ISBN 978-0860360162.
- Bit Parts in Shakespeare's Plays. Cambridge: Cambridge University Press. 1992. ISBN 978-0521416122.
- Playing Bit Parts in Shakespeare. London: Routledge. 1998. ISBN 978-0415182423.
- The Poet as Botanist. Cambridge: Cambridge University Press. 2008. ISBN 978-0521862363.
- A John Clare Flora. Nottingham: Trent Editions. 2016. ISBN 978-1842331590.
