= Robert Ferns Waller =

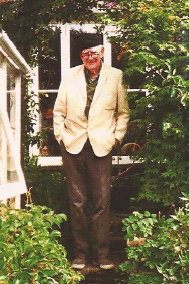
- Robert Ferns Waller aged 83
- Born: Robert Ferns Waller; 30 April 1913; Manchester, England
- Died: 3 November 2005 (aged 92); Exeter, England

Robert Ferns Waller (30 April 1913 – 3 November 2005) was a poet, editor, environmentalist, biographer and radio producer.

== Life ==
Waller was brought up in South London, attended Dulwich College, and spent a year in bed with rheumatic fever, during which time he read voraciously and formed a lifelong love of Shakespeare. He took a course in journalism at University College, London, where he also studied philosophy under Professor John Macmurray, whose ideas were another lifelong influence. Waller was on the fringes of the Euston Road School of artists; he became a protégé of T.S. Eliot, and worked as literary secretary to Sir Desmond MacCarthy. During World War II he served in the Royal Signals and was present at the D-Day landings. Two of his close friends, the artist Graham Bell and the writer John Mair, were killed during the war.

After demobilisation he was fortunate to land a post with the BBC's newly established Third Programme, as a producer of talks on philosophy and poetry. Having tired of London, he transferred in 1949 to BBC's Western Region in Bristol; he and his family lived for a time in the house of the novelist L.P. Hartley. For eight years he produced a variety of programmes including poetry, cricket commentary and agriculture. Through this last topic he came to know the agronomist Sir George Stapledon and to develop an ecological outlook. From 1957 to 1962 he worked as a freelance producer and researched his biography of Stapledon, Prophet of the New Age (1962). As a result of his contacts with the environmental movement, he became Editorial Secretary to the Soil Association, where he worked closely with Michael Allaby and persuaded the economist E. F. Schumacher (a Soil Association member since the early 1950s) to play a more prominent role. Waller resigned in 1972 and was for many years an Associate Editor of The Ecologist. During the 1970s he lived in rural Norfolk, moving to Bath in the early 1980s. In his later years he undertook editorial work for the Commonwealth Human Ecology Council (CHEC), and returned to write a column for the Soil Association journal Living Earth. Waller moved to Richmond in the mid-1990s, then, following the death in 2000 of his third wife Sue Dowdall, moved into an Exeter nursing home.

== Writing and literary activities ==
Robert Waller was a prolific writer throughout his life, contributing to the UCL student journal in the 1930s, and to Hugh Ross Williamson’s The Bookman. An inheritance enabled him to subsidise himself to write poetry, and in 1939 the Hogarth Press chose him as one of their Poets of Tomorrow. Erica Marx’s Hand and Flower Press published his long poem The Two Natures in 1951. During this period, influenced by Stapledon, he began to write on agriculture and ecology. His dissatisfaction with the BBC took satirical form in his 1956 novel Shadow of Authority. On Stapledon’s death in 1960 Waller became his literary executor, writing the biography Prophet of the New Age (1962) and then editing, and providing a long introduction to, Stapledon’s unpublished notes on environmentalism, Human Ecology. Waller’s attempt at summing up his own philosophy, Be Human or Die (1973), though not without interest, is over-ambitious and perhaps reflects the confusion of his domestic life at the time he was drafting it. In 1992 he published an autobiographical collection The Pilgrimage of Eros, which covered his pre-war life. Regrettably, he never completed an account of his years with the BBC or the Soil Association.

Waller also wrote for The Ecologist and Resurgence; his poetry appeared in The Criterion, Outposts, and New Writing, among other places; and he reviewed for Time and Tide and Books and Bookmen.

== Environmentalism ==
Waller worked as a Western Region producer of agricultural programmes, with figures such as A.G. Street, Ralph Wightman and Henry Williamson, coming to appreciate the importance of farming for a nation’s social structure and economy. The grassland authority and plant breeder R.G. (Sir George) Stapledon influenced him in the 1950s as powerfully as John Macmurray had in the 1930s, with his concept of “human ecology”: the study of humans in their total environment, including the natural world, society and the inner world of emotion and culture. Waller’s work on Stapledon’s biography brought him into contact with the organic husbandry movement, and during his time as editorial secretary of the Soil Association he sought to broaden the organisation’s appeal to the younger generation of environmental activists concerned by the revelations of Rachel Carson’s Silent Spring (1962). In the end, the ethos of the Association remained rather too squirearchical for him and he, along with Michael Allaby, found the radical atmosphere of The Ecologist more to his taste.

== Publications ==
=== Poetry ===
Contribution to Poets of Tomorrow, Hogarth Press, 1939

The Two Natures, Hand and Flower Press, 1951

=== Shadow of Authority, Jonathan Cape, 1956. ===
Part romance, part autobiography, predominantly satire, this novel deals with questions of bureaucratic control of the arts, cultural standards, the role - if any - of poetry in the “social state”, and the significance of regions in a national organisation. It explores the differences between those who try to preserve their personal integrity, and those content to abandon it for career advancement and security.

=== Sir George Stapledon ===
Prophet of the New Age: The Life and Thought of Sir George Stapledon, FRS, Faber and Faber, 1962. A biography of the noted agronomist which pays attention not just to his scientific work but to his interest in the arts.

Human Ecology by Sir George Stapledon, Faber and Faber, 1964, edited and introduced by Robert Waller. A blueprint for an ecologically balanced and progressive society. [Second edition published in 1971 by Charles Knight.]

=== Just Consequences, edited by Robert Waller, Charles Knight, 1971. ===
Subtitled “A survey of some contemporary health problems in relation to nutrition which suggests that there is a new pattern of diseases in Western civilisation”, this is a symposium based on the Soil Association's Attingham conference of 1969. It includes contributions from Dr. Hugh Sinclair, Surgeon-Captain T.L. Cleave, Dr. Innes Pearse and Professor Kenneth Mellanby, among others.

=== Be Human or Die, Charles Knight, 1973. ===
Subtitled “A study of humanism in European history as the background to a philosophy of human ecology; and an attempt to assess how an ecological humanism will change personality, the idea of reason and the form of civilisation”, this book attempts to provide a philosophical basis for an ecological approach to life, while avoiding the anti-human implications of Deep Ecology.

=== The Agricultural Balance Sheet, Green Alliance/Conservation Society, 1982. ===
A booklet assessing the achievements of post-war farming, and its environmental consequences.

=== The Pilgrimage of Eros, Antony Rowe, 1992. ===
Subtitled “A Sequence of Poems and Sketches from an Autobiography”, this consists of 40 pages of poetry written, with a few exceptions, between 1933 and 1952, followed by 130 pages of pre-war memoirs. These include vignettes of T.S. Eliot, Desmond MacCarthy, John Macmurray and Henry Miller.

=== The Poet of Ecology: A Selection of Writings in Memory of Robert Waller, Norroy Press, 2008. ===
Edited by Philip Conford, with the help of Robert Waller's daughter Anne Baillie and her husband Richard, this contains extracts from a wide range of Waller's writings, both prose and poetry, as well as tributes from many of Waller's friends and colleagues.

== Personal life ==
Waller married three times. In 1939 he married Janet Truman, by whom he had two children: Anne (b.1944) and William (b.1946). William was killed in a road accident in 1963 and Janet died aged 51 in 1970. A second marriage, to Helen Stenhouse-Simpson, was not a success. In 1979 he married Susan Shelley, née Dowdall, former wife of his friend the actor Frank Shelley and herself a successful actress; two decades of happiness followed, ended by her death in 2000.

Waller underwent a vivid out-of-body experience during an operation when a young man, which made him lastingly sceptical of materialist philosophies. Describing himself as an “undogmatic Christian”, he developed in many essays and long letters a philosophical outlook that steered between arid rationalism (whether theological or atheistic) and self-indulgent emotionalism or mysticism. Politically, this outlook implied a mistrust of both top-down socialism and the imposition of Thatcherism's free-market economics, against which he frequently inveighed. Waller supported the Green Party for much of the 1980s and 1990s.

Robert Waller was a prolific and generous letter-writer, and a close friend of the poet, critic and pacifist Derek Savage, with whom he maintained a correspondence for many years.

== Archival material ==
Robert Waller's papers are in the process of being lodged with the Special Collections at the University of Reading. Much of the material is already there; more will follow. Jennifer Glanville is managing this process.
