= Surbiton High School =

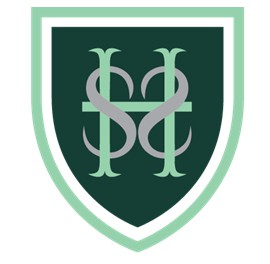

Location
- Surbiton Crescent; Kingston upon Thames, Greater London, KT1 2JT; England
- Coordinates: 51°24′00″N 0°18′17″W

Information
- Type: Private day school
- Motto: 'Amor Nos Semper Ducat' (May Love Always Lead Us)
- Religious affiliation: Church of England
- Established: 1884; 142 years ago
- Department for Education URN: 102611 Tables
- Head teacher: Principal: Matthew Shoults
- Gender: Girls (4–18); boys (4–11)
- Age: 4 to 18
- Houses: Austen, Curie, Fonteyn, Nightingale, Pankhurst, Parks and Teresa
- Colours: Green and silver
- Affiliation: United Learning
- Website: http://www.surbitonhigh.com
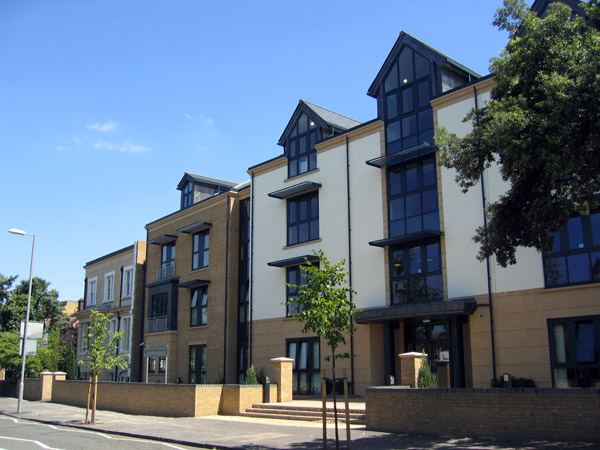
- Main building

Surbiton High School is a private day school in Surbiton in the Royal Borough of Kingston upon Thames, Greater London, England. It has seven buildings overall including the Boys’ Preparatory School, Girls’ Preparatory School, the Senior School and the Sixth Form.

== History ==
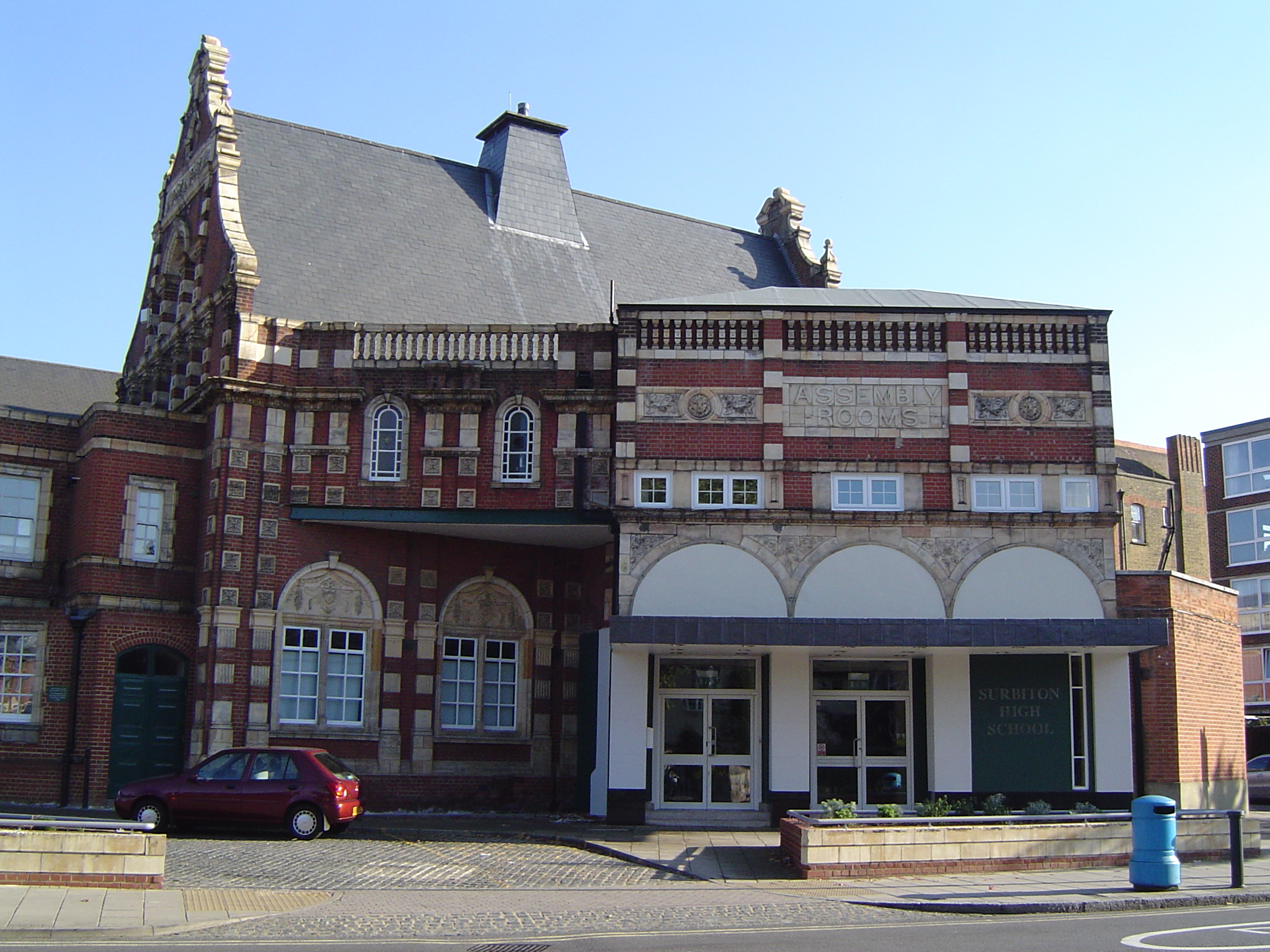
Assembly Rooms

The school was founded in 1884 by a group of Anglican clergymen who instituted the Church Schools Company. Its objective was "to establish superior education for girls in accordance with the principles of the Church of England" wherever the need was felt.

Surbiton High is the founding member school of the Church Schools Company, now the United Church Schools Trust. It has seven sites in Surbiton: the Boys' Preparatory School (over two sites Charles Burney House and Avenue Elmers), the Girls' Preparatory School, Main Senior School, Surbiton Assembly Rooms, Mary Bennett House and the Sixth Form Centre, as well as sports grounds at Hinchley Wood and Oaken Lane.

Since January 2025 the principal of Surbiton High School has been Matthew Shoults. Surbiton High School takes female students from 4 to 18 years old, while the Boys' Preparatory School caters for 4 to 11 year olds.

== Academics and Academic Results ==
Surbiton High School has a highly selective admissions process and students usually perform extremely well in GCSE and A-Level exams.

2024 GCSE exam results: 46% of all grades awarded at the highest level of Grade 9. Over 91% of all grades were awarded a Grade 7 or above and 100% of grades were Grade 9-4.

2024 A-level exam results and advancement to higher education: 62% of all grades were A* to A and over 85% of grades were A* to B. 81% of students headed to Russell Group and Times Top 10 Universities, and medical or dental schools with eleven Oxbridge students.

The school's 6th Form offers a very wide range of academic subjects: art and design, biology, business, chemistry, classical civilisation, classical Greek, computer science, dance, drama, design and technology textiles, design and technology product design, English language, English literature, French, German, geography, history of art, Latin, mathematics, further mathematics, music, politics, religious studies, philosophy, physics, photography, psychology, Spanish, sociology and sport science.

== Sport ==
Surbiton High School prides itself in being one the best schools in the United Kingdom for girls' sports. The school has been shortlisted for Times Educational Supplement (TES) sports awards multiple times, most recently in 2019 when it won the award. The School's SAS (Surbiton Advanced Sports) programme mentors their high performing athlete girls, helping them coordinate their training and competition schedule with their academic work. The school's sporting grounds are at the nearby Hinchley Wood Playing Fields.

=== Gymnastics ===
Both the senior school's and the prep school's gymnastics team regularly win regional and national titles. In the most recent, post-Covid years of 2024, 2023 and 2022 the gymnastics team won the BSGA (British Schools Gymnastics Association) floor and vault national title or podium places, as well as the acrobatic gymnastics national trophy. In April 2024 every single gymnast the school entered to the National Finals earned a medal. The coaching team consists of multiple British Gymnastics Level 5 High Performance coaches, as well as past world champions and medalists.

=== Rowing ===
The school has a rowing club called the Surbiton High School Boat Club which is based on the River Thames at Trowlock Way, Off Broom Road, Teddington. The club is affiliated to British Rowing (Boat code SBT) and produced a junior national champion crew at the 2013 British Rowing Junior Championships.

== Alumni ==
- Chemmy Alcott, Olympic skier
- Lola Anderson, Olympic rower
- Fran Balkwill OBE, scientist and author
- Muriel Box, Lady Gardiner, screenwriter and director
- Tina Cooper OBE, paediatrician
- Edwina Dunn OBE, entrepreneur
- Agnes Mary Field CBE, film producer and director
- Danusia Francis, Olympic gymnast
- Jane Hutt MS, Welsh Labour Party politician
- Mollie King, singer with The Saturdays
- Lara Lewington, journalist and television presenter
- Molly Mahood, literary scholar
- Florence Macdonald Mayor, writer
- Nicky Morgan, Baroness Morgan of Cotes, former Conservative MP and minister
- Lucie Silvas, singer
- Kim Thomas, Olympic rower
- Nora S. Unwin, book illustrator
- Emma Wilson, academic and writer
- Dorothy Maud Wrinch, mathematician
- Elsie Zimmern, women's rights activist
