= George Stapledon =

British plant scientist (1882–1960)

Sir George Stapledon FRS
- Stapledon in 1940
- Born: 22 September 1882; Northam, Devon, England
- Died: 16 September 1960; Bath, Somerset, England
- Education: United Services College
- Alma mater: Emmanuel College, Cambridge
- Occupation: Grassland scientist
- Known for: Scientist and environmentalism pioneer
- Title: Knight, Fellow of the Royal Society
- Spouse: Doris Wood Bourne
- Parent(s): William Stapledon and Mary Clibbert

Sir Reginald George Stapledon FRS (22 September 1882 – 16 September 1960) was a British grassland scientist and pioneer environmentalist.

== Early life ==
The sixth of the seven children born to shipping agent William Stapledon and Mary Clibbert (daughter of shipbuilder William Clibbert), Stapledon, who was born in Northam, Devon, also had three half-siblings. The family claimed to be related to Walter de Stapledon, the 14th century Bishop of Exeter. Educated at United Services College, Westward Ho!, and Emmanuel College, Cambridge (where he took the natural science tripos of geology, chemistry and botany) he worked in Suez for the family firm between 1904 and 1906 before giving up the commercial life.

== Grassland sciences ==
Developing a strong support for the idea of agricultural autarky, he returned to the University of Cambridge in 1907 to study biology and in 1910 joined the Royal Agricultural College where he came to argue that grasslands were at the heart of successful agriculture which in turn was at the heart of Britain's economic and spiritual well-being. He moved to University College of Wales in 1912 and whilst there married Doris Wood Bourne, who joined him in his work. Here he headed up a newly created Department of Botany. Between 1914 and 1918 he worked for the Board of Agriculture and Fisheries in London and succeeded in getting them to set up a seed testing station.

His longest service however was as director of the Welsh Plant Breeding Station in Aberystwyth, a post he held from 1919 to 1942. This had been set up using a £10,000 grant from Sir Laurence Philipps, who contributed a further £1000 for the first ten years of the institute's existence. Stapledon came to love the natural beauty of Wales and indeed argued that anybody who interfered with the 'shapely outline' of the Cambrian Mountains should be treated as a criminal. Following an ecological approach he developed a number of new varieties of grass, oats and clover, known as 'S' strains, and increased awareness of the importance of grasslands in agriculture, particularly in New Zealand where his work was especially influential. He had visited the country in 1926 during a bout of ill health and whilst there made a strong impression on Bruce Levy who followed much of Stapledon's work. His work was recognised in 1939 when he was elected a Fellow of the Royal Society and knighted. His work on grasslands continued during the Second World War when he took up the directorship of the grassland research station at Drayton, Stratford upon Avon in 1942, whilst he was also a founder member and first President of the British Grassland Society. Around this time he became a strong advocate of ley farming, feeling that it would help to feed Britain during the conflict. He also persuaded the government to set up a grassland research station at Hurley, Berkshire before his retirement in 1946.

== Politics and writing ==
As well as producing a number of scientific papers Stapledon also produced a number of works that were more political in tone, notably The Land: Now and Tomorrow (1935), The Way of the Land (1943), and Disraeli and the New Age (1943). In these he developed his idea of renewing society by making farming the central part of economic life. Looking for a return to small-holdings based on some of the social reforming ideas of Benjamin Disraeli, Stapledon argued that capitalism should exist only to serve his new rural vision. He was also a strong supporter of the National Parks movement, arguing that they were an important factor in bringing the city dweller into contact with the countryside. He found kindred spirits in some of the highly conservative rural organisations that existed at the time and was a member of both Rolf Gardiner's Kinship in Husbandry group and Montague Fordham's Rural Reconstruction Association.

== Later life ==
Given the low-levels of pensions for government science workers he was forced to return to work in 1947, accepting the position of Science Adviser to the Messrs Dunn's Farm Seeds company in Salisbury. His work was interrupted in 1952 by major surgery and he spent the rest of his life in severe ill health, suffering variously from angina, kidney problems, bronchitis, Ménière's disease and in his final three years profound hearing loss.

His contributions to science were honoured by a number of awards apart from the FRS and knighthood. He was an honorary member of the Highland and Agricultural Society and the Academies of Agriculture of Sweden and Czechoslovakia, received the Gold Medal of the Royal Agricultural Society and, in 1932, the CBE. Both the University of Nottingham (1951) and the University of Wales (1952) conferred honorary doctorates on him, although he was unable to accept the same honour from the University of Durham in 1958 as his ill health meant he was unable to travel to accept the award.

He died without offspring in 1960 in Bath, Somerset, having suffered several nervous breakdowns from 1926 onwards. His life was commemorated by the BBC who organised a series of tributes entitled 'I Remember Stapledon' for both the Welsh Service and then the Home Service. The Home Service tribute, in July 1961, was presented by Robert Ferns Waller, whose biography Prophet of the New Age gives the most complete account of Stapledon’s work. His nephew was the science fiction writer and philosopher Olaf Stapledon, son of George Stapledon's eldest brother William.

== Bibliography ==
- Stapledon, R.G.; Hanley, J.A. (1927). Grass Land. Clarendon Press.
- Stapledon, R.G. (1928). A Tour in Australia and New Zealand. Oxford University Press.
- Stapledon, R.G. (1935). The Land: Now and To-Morrow. Faber.
- Stapledon, R.G., ed. (1936). A Survey of the Agricultural and Waste Lands of Wales. Faber.
- Stapledon, R.G. (1937). The Hill Lands of Britain. Faber.
- Stapledon, Sir George (1939). The Plough-Up Policy and Ley Farming. Faber.
- Stapledon, Sir R. George; Davies, William (1941). Ley Farming. Penguin.
- Stapledon, Sir R. George (1941). Make Fruitful the Land!. Kegan Paul.
- Stapledon, Sir George (1943). The Way of the Land. Faber.
- Stapledon, Sir R. George (1943). Disraeli and the New Age. Faber.
- Stapledon, Sir George (1964). Waller, Robert (ed.). Human Ecology. Faber.
