= Emma Wilson =

British academic and writer

Emma Wilson FBA
- Born: 1967 (age 58–59)
- Occupations: Academic, writer
- Mother: Jacqueline Wilson
- Awards: Ordre des Palmes académiques (Chevalier, 2009)

Academic background
- Education: Surbiton High School
- Alma mater: Newnham College, University of Cambridge (BA, Ph.D)
- Thesis: The pain of the pleasure of the text: Tournier, reading and sexuality (1991)

Academic work
- Institutions: University of Cambridge

Emma Wilson (born 1967) is a British academic and writer, specialising in French literature and cinema. She is Professor of French Literature and the Visual Arts at the University of Cambridge and a fellow of Corpus Christi College.

== Early life and education ==
Emma Wilson is the only child of novelist Jacqueline Wilson and her former husband, William Millar Wilson, a police officer. She was born in Kingston, London in early 1967. She was a scholarship student at Surbiton High School and then studied French and Latin at Cambridge. After her first degree, she embarked on a PhD in the French department. Her thesis was entitled The pain of the pleasure of the text: Tournier, reading and sexuality.

== Academic career ==
Wilson then got a post as a university lecturer at University of Cambridge. She is a fellow of Corpus Christi College and Professor of French Literature and the Visual Arts at the university. She was previously Reader in Contemporary French Literature and Film and head of the university's Department of French.

In 2022, she was elected a Fellow of the British Academy (FBA), the United Kingdom's national academy for the humanities and social sciences.

=== Research ===
As a researcher, Wilson is author of six books and over twenty articles published in scholarly journals in the field of modern languages and film. Her published work includes book studies of Alain Resnais and Krzysztof Kieslowski as well as specific work on writers such as Marcel Proust, Marguerite Duras, Hélène Cixous and Michel Tournier. As well as her contribution to these author fields, however, Wilson's writing has applications to critical theory. In her 1996 work, Sexuality and the Reading Encounter, Wilson makes a contribution to reader response theory in relation to feminism and queer theory. She argues for the potential for change in the reader's identity through reading. The encounter between reader and text, she says, depends "not on pre-constructed identities, but on the very performance of identity in the process of reading." Wilson is particularly interested in the way that readers position themselves in relation to representations of desiring relations.

Wilson's 2003 study of the cinematic treatment of missing children, Cinema's Missing Children, was described as "a book rich in academic and cultural backstory".

== Contribution to the dissemination of French culture ==
On 6 May 2009, Wilson was awarded an Ordre des Palmes académiques Chevalier (knight) medal by the French ambassador to the United Kingdom, Maurice Gourdault-Montagne. This prestigious award is awarded by the French government to academics and educators. It recognises Wilson's sustained contribution to the dissemination of French culture and to education. As well as her active contribution to the teaching and research of her department, Wilson has set up a number of links between Cambridge University and French institutions such as the École normale supérieure lettres et sciences humaines in Lyon with which Cambridge now has a very successful ERASMUS programme.

== Personal life ==
While at university, she ensured coverage of works by female, queer, and non-binary writers, artists, and filmmakers. Wilson is a feminist, and puts this down to her relationship with her mother, her love of female writers, her time at an all-girls school, as well as her sexuality itself. She has no children.

== Published work ==
- Love, Mortality, and the Moving Image (Basingstoke: Palgrave Macmillan, 2012) ISBN 978-0230308398
- Atom Egoyan (Urbana, Illinois: University of Illinois Press, 2009) ISBN 978-0-252-07620-6
- Alain Resnais (Manchester: Manchester University Press, 2006) ISBN 978-0-7190-6406-7
- Cinema's Missing Children (Wallflower, 2003)
- Memory and Survival: The French Cinema of Krzysztof Kieslowski (Oxford: Legenda, 2000)
- French Cinema since 1950: Personal Histories (Duckworth, 1999) ISBN 0-7156-2849-6
- Sexuality and the Reading Encounter: Identity and Desire in Proust, Duras, Cixous and Tournier (Oxford: Oxford University Press, 1996) ISBN 0-19-815885-8
- (editor) Sexuality and Masquerade: The Dedalus Book of Sexual Ambiguity (Dedalus, 1996)
