= Allotments Organization Society =

The Allotments Organization Society and Small Holders Limited (established 1924) was an association that encouraged cooperative organization among smallholders and allotment gardeners in the United Kingdom, primarily by registering smaller local associations as Industrial and Provident societies and providing them with model rules of association. The society also functioned as a central repository of information and statistics related to allotment gardening and smallholding, and of advice to smallholders about cooperative purchasing and distribution. Through its three seats on the Ministry of Agriculture's allotments advisory committee it also advised the government and served as a channel of communication between smallholders and the state.

The society was set up to replace the rural-based Agricultural Organisation Society (est. 1901) that had disbanded in 1924. In 1930 it merged with the more urban-based National Union of Allotment Holders to form the National Society of Allotment and Leisure Gardeners Ltd.
