= Elsie Zimmern =

English women's rights activist

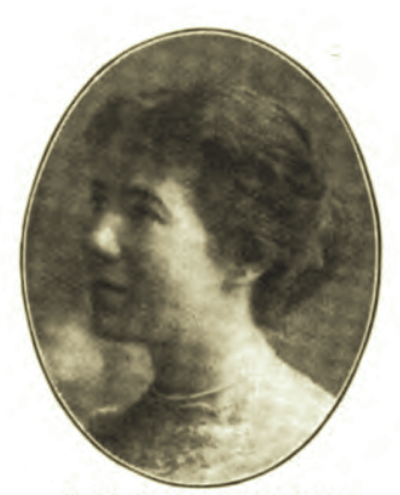
Elsie Zimmern

Elsie Mary Zimmern (1876–1967) was an English women's rights activist.

== Life ==
Elsie Zimmern was born in Surbiton and educated at Surbiton High School and later a private school in Geneva where she mastered French. She was the daughter of Adolf Zimmern, a naturalized British citizen who had been born in Germany. Her younger brother was the classical scholar and political scientist Alfred Eckhard Zimmern. Alice Zimmern and Helen Zimmern were cousins.

Elsie Zimmern helped found the Nursery Training School at Golders Green, and was its Honorary Secretary and Warden from 1911 to 1923. She became active in the National Council of Women, acting as Organizing Secretary of the NCW's Maternity and Child Welfare Committee from 1917 to 1928. From 1925 to 1930 she was the General Secretary of the International Council of Women, resigning when the ICW headquarters moved from London, as she could not leave her ill mother.

Lady Aberdeen introduced Zimmern to Madge Robertson Watt in 1928, and together they founded a new organization, the Associated Countrywomen of the World. Zimmern became Honorary Secretary of the ACW in 1929, working with Watt at the ACW until Watt's 1947 retirement. More pragmatic than Ward, Zimmern managed the ACWW financially. During the Second World War, Watt was in the United States and proposed moving the ACWW office to Cornell University; Zimmern resisted this relocation, and became acting chairman for the duration of the war.

Zimmern died in April 1967.
