= H. J. Massingham =

British writer (1888–1952)

- H. J. Massingham, by Elliott & Fry, 1948
- Born: 25 March 1888
- Died: 22 August 1952 (aged 64)
- Education: Westminster School; The Queen's College, Oxford
- Occupations: Writer, poet
- Spouse: Gertrude Massingham
- Parent: Henry William Massingham (father)

Harold John Massingham (25 March 1888 – 22 August 1952) was a prolific British writer on ruralism, matters to do with the countryside and agriculture. He was also a published poet.

== Life ==
Massingham was the son of the journalist H. W. Massingham. He was brought up in London, and was educated at Westminster School and Queen's College, Oxford. He failed to graduate from Oxford because of bad health. He then became a journalist in London. He worked for the Morning Leader, Athenaeum, and the Nation, and knew D. H. Lawrence. In the 1920s he became a research assistant for two anthropologists from University College, London, and an interest in archeology and anthropology, which proved lifelong, led to the publication of Downland Man (1926) and a number of other works. He worked on a research project whose aim was to show that all megalithic culture in England had spread from Egypt.

By 1932 Massingham began to write more and more on country life, and the first of a long series of such books, possibly his best-known, was Wold Without End (1932), reflecting his experiences living in Chipping Campden in the Cotswolds. A serious accident happened in 1937, when he injured his leg, leading to a two-year period of regular hospital visits, at the end of which he hurt the same leg again, and it had to be amputated. He was forced to stop travelling as frequently as he had been doing and settled down to writing some thirty more books.

He was strongly influenced by the writings of Gilbert White and edited selections of White's writings. He was one of a group of ruralist British writers of the period; Massingham's friend Adrian Bell, a farmer in Suffolk, was another prominent writer, and John Musty suggests that Massingham may have had a hand in getting Bell published. They have attracted subsequent attention both as precursors to later developments, such as organic farming, and because of their political entanglements in the 1930s (for example, Henry Williamson was a supporter of Oswald Mosley). Massingham himself wrote in a vein compatible with the Social Credit and distributist ideas current at the time, as in his 1943 The Tree of Life.

He was one of the twelve members of the Kinship in Husbandry, set up in 1941 by Rolf Gardiner, a society dedicated to countryside revival in a post-war world. According to academics Richard Moore-Colyer and Philip Conford, Massingham was uncomfortable with what he felt was a pro-German tendency in this group. When the Kinship later merged with two other bodies to form the Soil Association, Massingham with Gardiner, the landowner Lord Portsmouth and the agricultural journalist Lawrence Easterbrook came onto the Soil Association's Council.

Massingham was received into the Roman Catholic Church in the 1940s.

After Massingham's death his collection of tools, implements and products of craftsmanship and husbandry were donated to the Museum of English Rural Life. Many of the objects appear in his book "Country Relics".

== Works ==
- Letters to X from H.J. Massingham (1919) Constable & Co.
- Dogs, Birds, and Others (1921), letters to The Spectator, editor
- Some Birds of the Countryside: The Art Of Nature (1921)
- "John Clare". The Athenaeum, 4732 (7 January 1921): 9–10.
- Poems About Birds from the Middle Ages to the Present Day (1922), editor
- Andrew Marvell 1621–1678 Tercentenary Tributes (1922) co-editor
- Untrodden Ways – Adventures of English Coasts, Heaths and Marshes and Also Among the Works of Hudson, Crabbe and Other Country Writers (1923)
- Sanctuaries for Birds and How to Make Them (1924)
- In Praise of England (1924), miscellany
- H. W. M.: A Selection From the Writings of H. W. Massingham (1925), editor
- Downland Man (1926)
- Fee, Fi, Fo, Fum: The Giants in England (1926)
- The Golden Age: The Story of Human Nature (1927)
- The Heritage of Man (1929)
- Guide to the Cotswolds, with Clough Williams-Ellis, and others
- Pre-Roman Britain (1930)
- The Friend of Shelley: A Memoir of Edward John Trelawny (1930)
- A Treasury of seventeenth Century English Verse (1931) editor
- Birds of the Seashore (1931)
- Wold Without End (1932)
- London Scene (1933)
- The Great Victorians (1932), with Hugh Massingham
- English Country: Fifteen Essays by Various Authors (1934) editor, with H. E. Bates, Edmund Blunden, W. H. Davies, Vita Sackville-West, A. G. Street, John Collier
- Country (1934), illustrated with photographs by Edgar Ward
- World Without End (1935)
- Through the Wilderness (1935)
- The English Downland (1936), from The Face of Britain series
- The Genius of England (1937)
- The Writings of Gilbert White of Selborne (Nonesuch Press, 1938), editor, two volumes with engravings by Eric Ravilious
- Britain and the Beast (1937), essay volume with A. G. Street, J. M. Keynes, John Moore, E. M. Forster, Clough Williams-Ellis
- Shepherd's Country: a Record of the Crafts and People of the Hills (1938)
- Country Relics (1939)
- A Countryman's Journal (1939)
- The English Countryside (1939), editor, with Adrian Bell, Harry Batsford, H. E. Bates. Batsford, Harry; Fry, Charles; Clark, Geoffrey; Warren, C. Henry; Bozman, E. F.; Bell, Adrian; Fairfax- Blakeborough, J)
- The Sweet of the Year; March–April, May–June (1939)
- Chiltern Country (1940), from The Face of Britain series
- Cotswold Country (1941), from The Face of Britain series
- Remembrance, an autobiography (1941) with Paul Nash
- The Fall of the Year (1941)
- England and the Farmer a symposium (1941), editor, Viscount Lymington, Sir Albert Howard, C. Henry Warren, Adrian Bell, Rolf Gardiner, L. J. Picton and Sir George Stapledon.
- Field Fellowship (1942)
- The English Countryman: a Study of the English Tradition (1942)
- Men of Earth (1943)
- Tree of Life (1943)
- This Plot of Earth: A Gardener's Chronicle (1944)
- The Wisdom of the Fields (1945)
- Where Man Belongs: Rural Influence On Literature (1946)
- The Natural Order – Essays in the Return to Husbandry (1946) (editor, with Philip Mairet, Lord Northbourne, the Earl of Portsmouth (Illustrated by Thomas Hennell)
- The Small Farmer A Survey By Various Hands (1947), editor
- The Countryside and How to Enjoy it (1948)
- An Englishman's Year (1948)
- The Best Days (1949)
- The Curious Traveller (1950)
- The Faith of a Fieldsman (1951)
- Shakespeare Country, The, Including the Peak and the Cotswolds (1951)
- The Southern Marches (1952)

Published posthumously

- Prophesy of Famine: a Warning and the Remedy (1953), with Edward Hyams
- The Essential Gilbert White of Selborne (1983), editor, selected by Mark Daniel
- Fifteen Poems (Hayloft Press, 1987)
- A Mirror of England: an anthology of the Writings of H. J. Massingham (1882–1952), edited by Edward Abelson (1988)
