= Agricultural Organisation Society =

Cooperative promoter

- Founded: 1901
- Dissolved: 1924
- Type: Agricultural cooperative promoter
- Region served: England and Wales
- Members: More than 1,100 affiliated societies
- Key people: Robert Yerburgh (first president); J. Nugent Harris (secretary)

The Agricultural Organisation Society (AOS) was an agricultural association established in Great Britain in April 1901. Nominally an independent body, funded only by its members and supporters, the AOS soon forged close links with the British government which from 1909 gave it an annual grant. The AOS expanded its activities during the First World War but when peace returned the government cut its funding, leading to its eventual dissolution in 1924. During its relatively short life, the AOS was successful in fulfilling its main aim of promoting the growth of county-based agricultural co-operative societies. It was also instrumental in establishing the Women’s Institute movement in England and Wales.

== Foundation, organisational development and funding ==
The Agricultural Organisation Society (AOS) arose from the merger of the British Agricultural Organisation Society, which had been founded in 1900 in Newark-on-Trent, Nottinghamshire by W. L. Charleton, and the National Agricultural Union, a largely dormant body originally created following a National Agricultural Conference held in London on 7 December 1892. The president of the National Agricultural Union, Robert Yerburgh, the Conservative Member of Parliament (MP) for Chester, became the head of the new organisation with A.T. Matthews as the secretary, although by the close of 1901 he had been succeeded by J. Nugent Harris. A Board of Governors was also created and during the lifetime of the AOS many leading figures from the world of British agriculture were to sit on this, including the Earl of Shaftesbury, Lord Strachie, a former Parliamentary Secretary to the Board of Agriculture and Fisheries, Henry William Wolff, the founder and joint president of the International Co-operative Alliance, Hugh Fairfax-Cholmeley, the founder of the pioneering Brandsby Agricultural Trading Association, Montague Fordham, the founder of the Land Club Union and author of Mother earth: a proposal for the permanent reconstruction of our country life, the Conservative MP Charles Bathurst and the Liberal MPs George Nicholls, who was the chief organiser of the AOS’ Allotment and Small Holdings section, and Francis Dyke Acland, as well as the Liberal and later Labour MP and Minister of Agriculture and Fisheries, Noel Buxton.

The model for the AOS was the successful Irish Agricultural Organisation Society which had been created nearly a decade before in 1894. Originally the AOS’ remit was to cover the remainder of the British Isles but when it became apparent that this was overambitious, a separate Scottish Agricultural Organisation Society was formed in 1905, to be followed later, in 1922, by a Welsh Agricultural Organisation Society. Registered under the Industrial and Provident Societies Act as an organisation entirely independent of the British government, the AOS, which had its offices in Dacre House, Deere Street, Westminster, was at first solely financed by contributions from its members and supporters. However, as its workload continued to expand, especially following the enactment of the Smallholders Act 1907, it applied for government funding. Indeed, possibly in anticipation of this, the Smallholders Act specifically contained a provision allowing the Board of Agriculture and Fisheries to award money to any society which had as one of its objects the promotion of cooperation in connection with the cultivation of small holdings or allotments. Subsequently, the AOS was granted between £1,200 and £1,600 per annum for a period of three years starting from 1 April 1909, providing certain conditions were met. The AOS was to remain an independent body but one of these conditions was that its new 24 member Committee of Management would include six people nominated by the Board of Agriculture and Fisheries and two by the National Poultry Organisation Society, which had been absorbed into the AOS in 1909.

In July 1911, on the recommendation of the Development Commissioners, who had been appointed following the passing of the Development and Road Improvement Funds Act 1909, this government funding was placed on a more permanent footing, with the AOS again taking advantage of a specific provision in the legislation which permitted the awarding of grants to any non-profit making body that encouraged the formation of agricultural cooperatives. Following this change in its funding, at meetings held in April and May 1912, the old AOS was dissolved and a new society registered with the same name but this time under the Companies (Consolidation) Act 1908. Shortly afterwards the AOS moved into larger premises in Queen Anne's Chambers in Westminster and a new board of governors was appointed. In 1913 this had 36 members, 12 nominated by the Board of Agriculture, two each by the Association of County Councils and the Co-operative Union and 18 elected by affiliated societies alongside two others co-opted by the governors themselves.

During the First World War government grants given to the AOS continued to increase until in 1918 it was reported to be receiving £10,000 from the Treasury through the Food Production Department, £4,000 from the Small Holdings Account and £5,800 from the Development Fund together with a grant equal to four times the amount of the Society's income from contributions from affiliated farmers' societies and another equal to the amount of the subscriptions received. This rather complicated formula meant that by 1920 it was receiving a total yearly grant of £45,000 from the government.

== Activities and aims ==
The AOS was registered in April 1901 as a non-party and non-trading body whose main purpose was to ‘secure the co-operation of all connected with the land, whether as owners, occupiers or labourers, and to promote the formation of agricultural co-operative societies for the purchase of requisites, for the sale of produce, for agricultural credit banking and insurance, and for all other forms of co-operation for the benefits of agriculture.'

Among its aims the new society sought to:

1. Advertise the advantage of cooperatives by sending organisers to address meetings and give advice on how to form local societies.
2. Provide a set of “model rules” derived from the experience of similar societies.
3. Act as an information bureau giving expert advice to affiliated societies on matters such as the law and account keeping.
4. Act as arbitrator in disputes arising from the rules and administration of affiliated societies.
5. Encourage cooperation between affiliated members in trading matters.
6. Publish leaflets and circulars dealing with the various forms of agriculture cooperation as well as its own journal.
7. Act as a medium between affiliated members and government departments, county councils, railway companies etc.
8. Monitor the passage through parliament of any legislation that might impact on agricultural cooperatives or their members.

The AOS believed that the financial problems facing British farmers arose from the fact that they bought items at retail prices but sold their products at wholesale prices. The solution it advocated was the organisation of farmers into agricultural cooperative societies so that they would have more bargaining power when it came to negotiating with middlemen. Indeed, at a meeting organised by the newly created Worcestershire Farmers Limited in Tenbury Wells in October 1919, Jermyn Moorsom, a member of the AOS, openly spoke of cooperative societies being a form of self-defence and compared them with unions representing the miners and railway workers when making the general point that by acting as a unified group farmers would have more power in their negotiations with both suppliers and buyers. On their side the farmers seem to have seen the involvement of the AOS as giving some kind of guarantee that any organisation they were to form would remain solvent. At another meeting at the same venue, when a local farmer was asked what would happen if their new agricultural cooperative was to run into financial difficulties, he confidently asserted that this was highly unlikely in large part because it: ‘would be under the control of the A.O.S. who would give technical advice and keep them straight.’

== Achievements ==
The AOS seems to have been successful in its main aim of encouraging the creation of agricultural cooperative societies. The year it was founded it only had 25 registered affiliated societies but by 1904 this had already risen to 98. Following the passing of the Small Holdings Act 1907 the number rose even higher, so that by 1911 the AOS was able to claim that it represented 453 affiliated societies, 180 of which were focused on smallholdings and allotments. At the time the total collective turnover of these societies was £1,331,000 and they had a combined membership of 31,020. The increase in government funding during the First World War seems to have helped drive another surge in membership. By the end of the conflict in 1918, the number of affiliated societies was reported to have topped 1,000 and this figure continued to increase in the years afterwards, when a host of new societies were created, including South Shropshire Farmers and the Berks, Bucks and Oxon Farmers Limited.

Among its other aims, the AOS does seem to have had some successes in acting as a medium between affiliated members and government departments, county councils and railway companies. It is credited with playing a role in the establishment of schemes at Brandsby in Yorkshire and in the Teme Valley in Worcestershire in which railway companies purchased trucks specifically to carry produce at competitive rates to and from farms and local train stations. It also produced a number of publications, including an annual report and a monthly journal as well as a plethora of pamphlets. It helped found the Agricultural Wholesale Society and supported the creation of agricultural credit societies which were important in breaking down the traditional reluctance of farmers to borrow money.

During the First World War the AOS actively supported the formation of a Women’s Institute movement in England and Wales. It provided Madge Watt with funds to establish the first institutes in 1915, and in 1916 established a Women's Institute Sub-Committee, which was chaired by Gertrude Denman, who, in 1917, became president of the newly established National Federation of Women's Institutes.

== Dissolution ==
The AOS lost its government funding in 1923. The ending of the grant was not unexpected, as it had been announced earlier in 1919. MPs pressing for the ending of public funding argued that the AOS should instead be financed by its affiliated societies which by 1922 were reported to have a combined annual turnover of £11,179,422. However, although at the end of 1918 the AOS claimed to represent 1,100 affiliated societies, only 151 farmers' societies and 190 allotment societies had actually paid affiliation fees in 1917. Critics of the AOS in parliament also voiced concern over allegations that it was funding the Agricultural Wholesale Society, giving it an unfair advantage over its private competitors as well as complaining about the terms of a £15,000 loan it had been granted by the Treasury for the acquisition of new premises which was free of interest until 31 March 1922. The government grant was officially withdrawn on 31 March 1923 and the AOS seems to have ceased operating sometime in the first half of 1924.

== Successor organisations ==
The AOS only functioned for just over two decades but many of the cooperatives it helped create, such as Worcestershire Farmers Limited, continued to thrive throughout much of the twentieth century and even, in some cases, beyond. After its demise, some of the work of the AOS was continued by the Allotments Organization Society and Small Holders Limited but no real successor organisation ever appeared in England. In contrast the Welsh and Scottish agricultural organisation societies continue to operate as does the Irish Agricultural Organisation Society although it has been renamed the Irish Co-operative Organisation Society Limited.
