= A. G. Street =

English farmer, writer and broadcaster (1892–1966)

Arthur George Street (7 April 1892 – 21 July 1966), who wrote under the name of A. G. Street, was an English farmer, writer and broadcaster. A number of his books were published by the literary publishing house of Faber and Faber. His best-known book was Farmer's Glory, describing his time in Canada and how he returned to Wiltshire.

== Life and work ==
The son of a Wiltshire tenant farmer, Street was born at Ditchampton Farm, Wilton, near Salisbury, where he eventually took over the tenancy. He was educated at Dauntsey's School, where agriculture was part of the curriculum, and left school in 1907 at the age of sixteen. He then spent some years learning farming from his father. He later wrote that:

I did not do much actual laborious work, but my father made me do every job on the farm at some time or another in order that I might, from personal knowledge, be able to estimate whether a man was working well or ill at any particular job. I was much older before I realised how much I did learn in those first years after leaving school.

Next, Street spent some years working on a farm in Canada, arriving in Winnipeg in 1910. There he learnt a more expansive form of agriculture than he knew at home.

First of all a working farmer, Street began to try his hand at writing as a way to supplement his farm income when it was severely reduced by prices falling during the great agricultural depression of the 1920s and 1930s. He continued to farm after he became a popular author. He portrayed farm life in the south of England without idealizing it, and his use of dialect strengthens his imagery of rural life. His books were mainly light fiction, often based on the Wiltshire farming community and to some degree autobiographical. His book Strawberry Roan was turned into a film. A critical work of 2006 brackets him with George Sturt, Adrian Bell, Henry Williamson, W. H. Hudson, H. J. Massingham, H. V. Morton, Constance Holme and Mary Webb. A number of his books were illustrated by the artist Lionel Edwards.

He wrote a weekly column for Farmers Weekly for thirty years. He was also a prolific radio broadcaster, appearing on The Brains Trust and many other BBC radio programmes, and a member of the Empire Poetry League. He hosted the programme Guest Night from 1938 to 1939 and in 1946.

During the Second World War he was a member of the Home Guard, on one occasion joining the chase for a missing German parachutist.

Street is himself the subject of a radio programme by the poet Sean Street.

== Family ==
Street's sister Dorothea Street was also an author, her children's book The Dog-Leg Garden being published in 1951. His sister Fanny Street founded Hillcroft College.

His daughter Pamela Street was an author and poet, and wrote a biography My Father, A. G. Street (Robert Hale, 1969), with a foreword by the historian Arthur Bryant.

== Books ==
Street's books include the following, with year of publication:

- Farmer's Glory (1932); new edition by Little Toller Books (2017)
- Strawberry Roan (1932)
- Country Days: a series of broadcast talks (1933)
- Land Everlasting (1934)
- Thinking Aloud (1934)
- The Endless Furrow (1934)
- Country Calendar (1935)
- To be a Farmers Boy (1935); re-issued as Farming: How to Begin
- The Gentlemen of The Party (1936)
- Moonraking (1936)
- Farming England (1937)
- Already Walks To-Morrow (1938)
- Hedge Trimmings (1938)
- A Year of My Life (1939)
- A Crook in the Furrow (1940)
- Round the Year on the Farm (1941)
- Wessex Wins (1941)
- Harvest by Lamplight (1941)
- From Dusk till Dawn (1943)
- Hitler's Whistle (1943)
- Ditchampton Farm (1946)
- Holdfast (1946)
- England today in Pictures (1949)
- Landmarks (1949)
- In His own Country (1950)
- Wheat and Chaff (1950)
- Shameful Harvest (1952)
- Feather Bedding (1954)
- Kittle Cattle (1954)
- Master of None (1956)
- Sweetacres (1956)
- Bobby Bocker (1957)
- Coopers Crossing (1962)
- Fair Enough (1962), writing as "James Brian"
- Fish and Chips (1964)
- Johnny Cowslip (1964)

== Other work ==
Street also wrote many newspaper and magazine articles and contributed to travel and other books, including:

- Essay in English Country: Fifteen Essays by Various Authors (1934, ed. H. J. Massingham, with H. E. Bates, Edmund Blunden, W. H. Davies, Vita Sackville-West, and John Collier)
- Foreword to Dorothy Hartley's The Countryman's England (1935)
- Essay in Britain and the Beast (1937, with J. M. Keynes, John Moore, E. M. Forster, Clough Williams-Ellis and H. J. Massingham)
- "This Bloody Sport" in The London Mercury and Bookman (1938), pp. 139–143
- "Farm Cottages and Post-War Farming" in Design for Britain (E. C. Fairchild 1942)
- "Work and Wages: A Farmer's View", in New English Review, Vol. 12 (1946), pp. 241–249
- "The Farming Year" in The Countryside and How to Enjoy it (1948)
- "The Inner History of Camping" in A Book of Modern Prose (ed. Margaret Flower, 1951)

During the 1950s and early 1960s he co-edited a monthly journal, Country Fair, with Macdonald Hastings.
