= Arthur Bryant =

English historian and columnist (1899–1985)

Sir Arthur Bryant
- Born: 18 February 1899; Dersingham, England
- Died: 22 January 1985 (aged 85); Salisbury, England
- Occupations: Historian, columnist

Sir Arthur Wynne Morgan Bryant, CH, CBE (18 February 1899 – 22 January 1985) was an English historian, columnist for The Illustrated London News and man of affairs. His books included studies of Samuel Pepys, accounts of English eighteenth- and nineteenth-century history, and a life of George V. He moved in high government circles, where his works were influential, writing histories of three prime ministers: Winston Churchill, Clement Attlee, and Harold Wilson.

Bryant's historiography was often based on an English romantic exceptionalism drawn from his nostalgia for an idealised agrarian past. He hated modern commercial and financial capitalism, he emphasised duty over rights, and he equated democracy with the consent of "fools" and "knaves".

Whilst his scholarly reputation has declined somewhat since his death, he continues to be read and to be the subject of historical studies.

== Early life ==
Arthur Bryant was the son of Sir Francis Morgan Bryant, who was the chief clerk to the Prince of Wales, and wife, Margaret Edmunds. His father would later hold a number of offices in the royal secretariat, eventually becoming registrar of the Royal Victorian Order. Arthur grew up in a house bordering the Buckingham Palace gardens near the Royal Mews. There, he developed a feel for the trappings of traditional British protocol and a strong attachment to the history of England.

He attended school at Pelham House, Sandgate, and Harrow School where his younger brother the Rev. Philip Henry Bryant later became an assistant Master. Though he expected to join the British Army, he won in 1916 a scholarship to Pembroke College, Cambridge. Despite that, he joined the Royal Flying Corps and was commissioned as a second lieutenant in October 1917.

While there, he served in the first squadron to bomb the towns of the Rhineland during the First World War. He was for a time the only British subject formally attached to the American Expeditionary Forces' Air Service, to one of its detachments that had arrived in England for training for frontline service.

In 1919, he read Modern History at Queen's College, Oxford, obtaining distinction in the honours courses offered to ex-servicemen in 1920.

== Early career ==
Bryant started work at a school operated by the London County Council, where he developed a strong sense of social justice and became convinced that education would be an effective way of uniting the people. That conviction led him to become a historian. Tall, dark, and handsome, he was popular at the debutante balls he regularly attended, where he often persuaded his dancing partners to help him teach some of the less fortunate children at a children's library he had established in Charles Dickens's old house in Somers Town, London.

He became a barrister at the Inner Temple in 1923, but left later that year to take the headmaster position of the Cambridge School of Arts, Crafts, and Technology, becoming the youngest headmaster in England. He organised the Cambridge Pageant in 1924 and the Oxford Pageant in 1926. Altogether, he proved remarkably successful in enrolling students, the school growing from three hundred to two thousand students in his three years there.

During 1926, he married Sylvia Mary Shakerley, daughter of Walter Geoffrey Shakerley, the third Baronet Shakerley. See later for his divorce and second marriage.

In 1927 he became a lecturer in history for the Oxford University delegacy for extramural studies, a position he retained until 1936. His marriage was dissolved in 1930. He served as an advisor at the Bonar Law College at Ashridge in Hertfordshire. His first book, The Spirit of Conservatism, appeared in 1929 and was written with his former students in mind.

== Historian ==
=== 1930s ===
In 1929, after cataloguing the Shakerley family library, he was asked by a friend in publishing to produce a new biography of Charles II of England. Yale Professor Frank W. Notestein suggested that he begin the work with Charles's escape following the Battle of Worcester, incorporating details of his earlier life into the narrative thereafter. This dramatic opening led the Book Society to choose it as their October 1931 selection, and it became a best-seller. Bryant's success with this volume encouraged him, and he remained in that field. The book has been described as being both readable and informed by solid scholarship.

He was a Tory, and edited the Ashridge Journal for the Tory think-tank. He wrote works on Stanley Baldwin and Neville Chamberlain. He was described as a "fellow traveller of the right, open Nazi sympathiser in Britain, an extreme apologist for Nazi Germany and an anti-Semite." He reminded readers that Winston Churchill was a "disloyal renegade" who had promised to support Chamberlain as leader in 1937.

He regularly continued to produce pageants. These included the Wisbech and Hyde Park pageants, and the Naval Night Pageant in Greenwich, which was attended by the King, Queen, Prince of Wales, British Cabinet, and members of the World Economic Conference. For the quality of his work in this field, he was acclaimed "the English Reinhardt".

He helped found the National Book Association, and its subsidiary, the Right Book Club, as an alternative to the Left Book Club. The new organisation was not outstandingly successful, however, although it did publish several of his own writings.

In January 1939, the National Book Club published a new English edition of Mein Kampf, for which Bryant wrote a foreword praising Hitler (with reservations: he denounced Nazi persecution of Jews) and comparing him to Benjamin Disraeli.

His next book was a three-volume biography of Samuel Pepys, completed in 1938 and regarded as "one of the great historical biographies in the language" by John Kenyon.

Bryant also was a frequent contributor to London papers and magazines, and scripted radio broadcasts relating to his historical interests, as well as radio plays for the BBC. He published a collection of scripts in his book The National Character. He was editor of the Ashridge Journal and president of the Ashridge Dining Club.

=== 1940s and Second World War ===
Unfinished Victory was a book which Bryant had published in January 1940; it dealt with recent German history, and explained sympathetically how Germany had rebuilt herself after World War I. Bryant asserted that certain German Jews had benefited from the economic crises and controlled the national wealth, and although he criticised the destruction of Jewish shops and synagogues, he declared that the Third Reich might produce "a newer and happier Germany in the future". Historian Richard Griffiths described the text in Patterns of Prejudice as "clearly pro-Nazi and antisemitic".

Initially, most reviewers received the book positively, but after the 'phoney war' ended, public and elite opinion turned sharply against appeasement of any sort. Bryant realised his mistake in proposing a compromise and tried to buy up unsold copies.

After the fall of France in 1940, Bryant's writing celebrated British patriotism. His English Saga, published at the end of that year, described England as "an island fortress...fighting a war of redemption, not only for Europe but for her own soul". Roberts says of his popular essays and books, "Bryant did a superb job in helping to stiffen the people's resolve by putting their sacrifices in historical context."

He married again, in 1941, to Anne Elaine Brooke, daughter of Bertram Willes Dayrell Brooke, one of the White Rajahs of Sarawak. His books during this decade dealt less prominently with the 17th century, and included a collection of Neville Chamberlain's speeches.

His works during this period were well-received for their style and readability, although they also tended to be less well researched, which has caused them to be questioned by younger historians. Several of these works, including English Saga (1940), The Years of Endurance 1793–1802 (1942), and Years of Victory, 1802–1812, drew notable criticism, particularly for his preoccupation with comparing Napoleon with Hitler. The shortcomings of these works, possibly combined with their unusual popularity, helped ensure that he never received the highest academic honours.

=== 1950s ===
His single major work in the decade was a two-volume collection of Alan Brooke, 1st Viscount Alanbrooke's diaries with additional commentary, The Turn of the Tide (1957) and The Triumph in the West (1959). These books created substantial controversy, given their criticism of Churchill, who was then at the height of his popularity. they are still considered essential reading for understanding the British Armed Forces during the war, although they have been superseded by the 2001 unexperguated edition, with criticism of people still alive in the 1950s.

== Final years ==
The books he wrote during his later years included several volumes of broad English histories. They include Set in a Silver Sea (1984), Freedom's Own Island (1986, edited posthumously by John Kenyon), and a third volume. He retained a large readership and was guest-of-honour at the Conservative Monday Club's 1966 annual dinner. He spoke on "The Preservation of our National Character". The dinner, at the Savoy Hotel, was sold out.

Bryant was knighted in 1954 and appointed a Member of the Order of the Companions of Honour in 1967. J. H. Plumb wrote, "both of his public honours, his Knighthood and his C.H., were given to him by Harold Wilson, whose favourite historian he had long been." His second marriage dissolved in 1976. In his final years, he lived at Myles Place, Salisbury, Wiltshire.

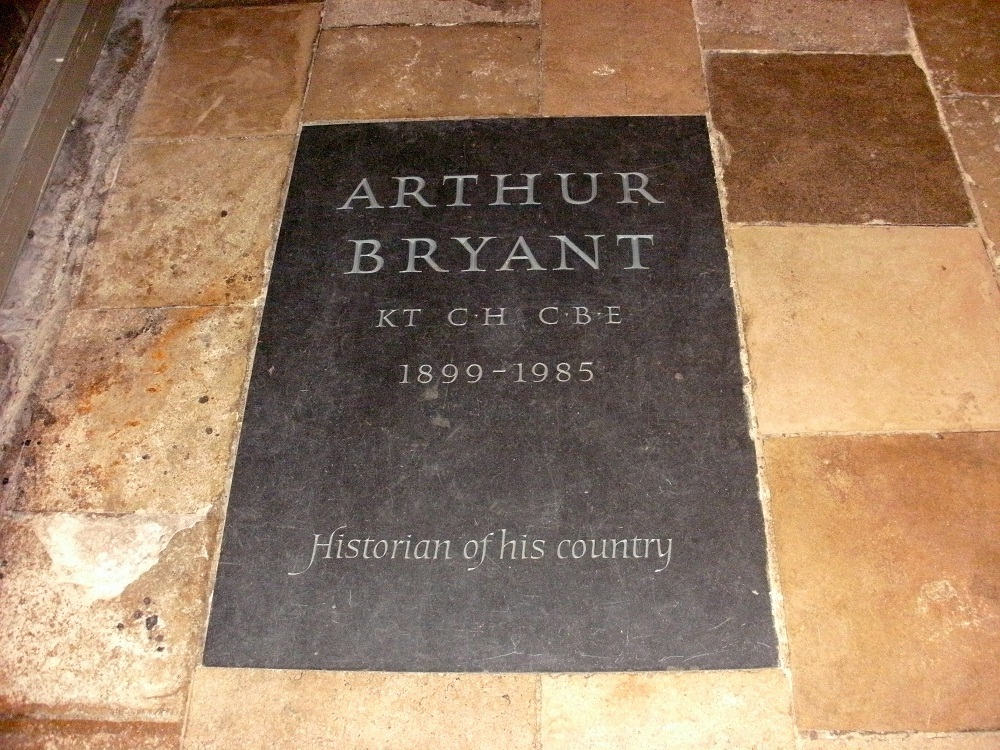
Bryant's grave in Salisbury Cathedral

== Death ==
Bryant died after a brief illness at the age of 85 at Salisbury in the county of Wiltshire on 22 January 1985. He was cremated, with his ashes being entombed in Salisbury Cathedral.

== Works ==
Bryant's total output was remarkable. He wrote over forty books overall, which collectively sold over two million copies. Most were published by William Collins, Sons and Co. Ltd. Also, in collaboration with W. P. Lipscomb, he wrote a play Thank You, Mr. Pepys! dramatising Pepys' life which ran for one hundred and fifty performances in London. He was a frequent lecturer, speaking at many of the leading cities and schools in Great Britain, as well as in the United States and fourteen European countries. His public speeches included the 1935 Watson Chair lectures sponsored by the Sulgrave Manor Trust. These lectures, on American history, literature, and biography, were later collected into the book The American Ideal.

In 1936, Bryant took over G. K. Chesterton's "Our Note Book" column for the Illustrated London News. (Bryant paid tribute to Chesterton in his introduction to Chesterton's posthumously-published essay collection The Glass Walking-Stick.) He continued writing this column until his death, which occurred almost half a century after Chesterton's. Overall, Bryant produced about 2.7 million words for that magazine.

== Historical reputation ==
Andrew Roberts claims that Bryant's work on Samuel Pepys gave insufficient credit to the scholarly work of Joseph Robson Tanner (1860–1931). J. H. Plumb gives this account of how G. M. Trevelyan passed Tanner's notes to Bryant:

he found Bryant's book [on Charles II] convincing and, equally exciting for Trevelyan, beautifully written. [...] Trevelyan thought Arthur Bryant ideal for the job (he quickly accepted the task) and the notes were handed over. The notes reached 1689 and so did Bryant's biography; the last decade of Pepys's life went unrecorded.

Roberts also claimed that Bryant remained in indirect contact with the Nazis in early 1940, after the outbreak of World War II, and that these ties had been requested by the Foreign Secretary.

Although professional historians were frequently negative about his best-sellers, Bryant's histories were explicitly praised by prime ministers Stanley Baldwin, Neville Chamberlain, Churchill, Attlee, Macmillan, Wilson, James Callaghan and Margaret Thatcher.

J. H. Plumb, one of Bryant's detractors, wrote:

What Bryant longed for, his one abiding disappointment of life, was professional recognition. He would have given anything for an Hon. D. Litt at Cambridge, perhaps more for a Fellowship of the British Academy. He never had the slightest chance of either. [...] Bryant of course had gifts. He wrote far better than nearly all professional historians. [...] He over-wrote certainly, and there was often a note of falsity, even of vulgarity, but largely his failure was of intellect.

Plumb's verdict is that Bryant killed off 'patrician history':

Like Churchill, but unlike Trevelyan, Bryant inflated patrician history so much that he destroyed it. Indeed he vulgarised it to a degree that made it incredible.

Plumb cites Trevelyan's possible heirs as C.V. Wedgwood and A. L. Rowse.

Another detractor is the British historian Andrew Roberts, who has said

Bryant was in fact a Nazi sympathiser and fascist fellow-traveller, who only narrowly escaped internment as a potential traitor in 1940. He was also, incidentally, a supreme toady, fraudulent scholar and humbug.

Roberts's polemical essay, prompted by the opening of archive material on Bryant, has been followed (and rebutted) by Julia Stapleton's full academic study. Bryant's first biographer was Pamela Street, a neighbour of his in Salisbury, who on occasion had collaborated with Bryant in his historical works, and who was a daughter of farmer-author A. G. Street. Her book appeared during Bryant's lifetime.

Bryant was aware of the liabilities of writing fast-moving, grand, rather literary narratives. With more self-awareness than some scholars may give him, Bryant answered his critics to some extent when he wrote in 1962,

In these days of specialized and cumulative scholarship, for one man to try to survey a nation's history in all its aspects is an act of great presumption. It involves problems of arrangement and writing so baffling that it is seldom attempted, and with reason, since, through compression and generalization on the one hand and the selection of misleading detail on the other, it can so easily lead to over-simplification and misrepresentation. I am very conscious of the imperfections of a work that seeks to cover a field of knowledge so much wider and deeper than any single mind can master. Yet, if my work has any virtue, it is that it attempts, however imperfectly, just this. For if the ordinary reader is to understand his country's past, someone must essay the task or the truth will go by default. Because of this I had thought of calling my book The Tower of Memory. Unless those responsible for a nation's policy--in a parliamentary democracy the electors--can climb that tower, they cannot see the road along which they have come or comprehend their continuing destiny (The Age of Chivalry, 14).

== List of works ==
- Rupert Buxton. A Memoir (privately printed, Cambridge, 1925)
- The Spirit of Conservatism (Methuen & Co., 1929)
- King Charles II (Longmans, Green & Co., 1931) - revised (Collins, 1955)
- Macaulay (Peter Davies, 1932) - about Thomas Babington Macaulay, reprinted (Collins, 1979)
- Life of Samuel Pepys in three volumes:
  - The Man in the Making (Cambridge University Press, 1933)
  - The Years of Peril (Cambridge University Press, 1935)
  - The Saviour of the Navy (Cambridge University Press, 1938)
- The Man and the Hour: Studies of Six Great Men of Our Time (Philip Allan, 1934) - Edward VII; Lenin; Briand; Pilsudski; Mussolini; Hitler
- The Letters, Speeches and Declarations of King Charles II (editor; Cassell, 1935)
- The England of Charles II (Longmans, Green & Co., 1935) - reprinted as Restoration England (Collins, 1960)
- Postman's Horn: Anthology of the Letters of Latter Seventeenth Century England (editor; Longmans, 1936) - revised (Van Thal, 1946)
- The American Ideal (Longmans, Green & Co., 1936)
- George V (Peter Davies, 1936) - George V
- Stanley Baldwin: A Tribute (Hamish Hamilton, 1937) - Stanley Baldwin
- The Search for Peace (1939), a collection of Neville Chamberlains' speeches up to the end of the Munich Crisis
- Unfinished Victory (Macmillan & Co., 1940)
- English Saga, 1840–1940 (Collins/Eyre & Spottiswoode, 1940)
- The Years of Endurance, 1793–1802 (Collins, 1942)
- Dunkirk (A Memorial) (Macmillan, 1943) - pamphlet
- Years of Victory, 1802–1812 (Collins, 1944)
- The Battle of Britain/The Few (Daily Sketch, 1944) - with Edward Shanks
- Historian's Holiday (Dropmore Press, 1946) - limited ed., reprinted (Collins, 1951)
- Trafalgar and Alamein (Withy Grove Press, 1948), with Edward Shanks and Field Marshal Montgomery of Alamein
- The Summer of Dunkirk/The Great Miracle (Daily Sketch, 1948) - with Edward Shanks
- The Age of Elegance, 1812–1822 (Collins, 1950)
- The Story of England: Makers of the Realm (Collins, 1953)
- The Turn of the Tide 1939–1943 (Collins, 1957) - Alanbrooke Diaries, vol. 1
- Triumph in the West 1943–1946 (Collins, 1959) - Alanbrooke Diaries, vol. 2
- Liquid History (Curwen Press, 1960) - "Fifty Years of the Port of London Authority"
- Jimmy, the Dog of My Life (Lutterworth Press, 1960)
- The Age of Chivalry (Collins, 1963)
- The Fire and the Rose (Collins, 1965)
- The Medieval Foundation (Collins, 1966)
- Protestant Island (Collins, 1967) - prequel to The Medieval Foundation
- The Lion and the Unicorn: A Historian's Testament (Collins, 1969)
- The Great Duke; or the Invincible General (Collins, 1971) - biography of the Duke of Wellington
- Jackets of Green (Collins, 1972) - study of the Rifle Brigade
- A Thousand Years of British Monarchy (Collins, 1975)
- Leeds Castle: A Brief History (1980) - Leeds Castle Foundation
- The Elizabethan Deliverance (Collins, 1980)
- Spirit of England (Collins, 1982)
- Set in a Silver Sea: A History of Britain and the British People (Collins, 1984) - vol. 1
- Freedom's Own Island: A History of Britain and the British People (Collins, 1986) - vol. 2
- Search for Justice: A History of Britain and the British People (Collins, 1990) - vol. 3

== Sources ==
- Plumb, J. H. (1988). "Chapter 8 The Last Patricians". The Making of an Historian. Vol. 1. University of Georgia Press. ISBN 978-0-8203-1095-4..
- Roberts, Andrew (1994). "Patriotism: The Last Refuge of Sir Arthur Bryant". Eminent Churchillians. Simon & Schuster. ISBN 978-0-671-76940-6..
- Soffer, Reba (2009). History, Historians, and Conservatism in Britain and America: From the Great War to Thatcher and Reagan. OUP Oxford. pp. 110–78. ISBN 978-0199208111.
