= Rural Reconstruction Association =

British agricultural reform movement

The Rural Reconstruction Association (RRA) was a British agricultural reform movement established in 1926 with Montague Fordham as its Council Secretary, a post he held for 20 years.

== History ==
Influenced by the ideas of guild socialism, the RRA sought for a time the creation of a National Agricultural Guild with land ownership held by land councils who would operate as local sections of the Guild. Its main consistent aims however were to revive agriculture and to decentralise the population of Britain. It sought to standardise prices and produce grading, regulate imports and encourage more of a balance between agriculture and industry which, it argued, would benefit both sectors by ending over-reliance on manufacturing. As such, the Agricultural Marketing Act 1931, Wheat Act 1932 and Agricultural Marketing Act 1933, all of which moved towards protectionism in agriculture, were seen by the RRA as a vindication of their arguments.

Their 1936 document The Revival of Agriculture attacked modern economics whilst praising what they saw as the more realistic approach of Elizabethan times, where financiers were servants of producers rather than masters. They argued that this system could be returned by controlling imports and so allowing domestic agricultural produce to reach a higher value. This would mean that banks would be more prepared to advance loans to farmers and would lead to the creation of a system of agricultural credit banks. A revived agricultural sector was also presented as being central to national well-being as it would encourage fresh organic produce.

The group grew close to the Economic Reform Club and Institute (ECRI) in the 1940s and with the ECRI it produced, between 1944 and 1956, a journal dedicated to the reform of the rural economy edited by Jorian Jenks. Jenks' Rural Economy journal proved the focal point for fascist sympathies within the movement as Jenks, a former member of the British Union of Fascists, was close to the Union Movement.

The group enjoyed the support of some leading British figures as Sir George Stapledon and Lord Lymington were amongst the members of its board whilst Lord O'Hagan served as President of the movement for a time.
