= William Courtenay (filmmaker) =

British soldier and war correspondent

William Courtenay OBE MM (1896 – 6 June 1960) was a British soldier and war correspondent who created unprecedented colour film of various locales and events of the Second World War.

== Early life ==
Courtenay was born in Wallasey, Cheshire in 1896.

== Military career ==
Courtenay fought in a battalion of the Cheshire Regiment at Gallipoli in 1915 and Gaza in 1917 before becoming a pilot in the Royal Flying Corps that same year. He was also a founder-member of the Royal Air Force. Courtenay was awarded the Military Medal during the Battle of Gaza.

== Journalist ==
In 1931 Courtenay became the aviation correspondent with the Evening Standard and then joined Kemsley newspapers in 1939. He was an aeronautical correspondent and lecturer in the United Kingdom and United States until 1942. Courtenay served initially in the Auxiliary Air Force during the Second World War before resuming as a journalist. In 1942 he was accredited to United States forces and sailed to Australia with them in February 1942. Courtenay took part in campaigns and landings of the pacific islands including Guam and Okinawa and landed in Japan on V-J Day with the American 11th Airborne Division.

Through his work he formed a close friendship with General Douglas MacArthur.

== Films and legacy ==
Courtenay had purchased a 16mm cinema camera and a large stock of colour film while in America. While a correspondent for the Sunday Times travelling with American forces through the Pacific, Courtenay took films of the events and locales he visited, including attacks on islands, the aftermath of the Hiroshima and Nagasaki bombings, and Emperor Hirohito's public addresses. After the war his films were shown to a wide variety of audiences including those in the British parliament and the White House. Today his films are considered among the best colour images of the Second World War. In 2016 the Smithsonian television channel aired a special about Courtenay's travels and films called Fall of Japan: In Color.

Courtenay was appointed an Officer of the Order of the British Empire (OBE) in the 1950 New Year Honours.

== Family life ==
Courtenay married Greta Harting in 1932 and had a son, Paul. After her death in 1934 he married a second time and had two daughters. He died at his home in Saltdean in Sussex on 6 June 1960 aged 64.
