= Montague Fordham =

Montague Edward Fordham (1864–1948) was an English agriculturalist and advocate of rural reform. He belonged to the Religious Society of Friends, and was a historian and barrister by profession.

Fordham first gained notability in Birmingham where he was involved in a number of initiatives in support of traditional handicraft. To this end, he was the first director of the Birmingham Guild and School of Handicrafts following its 1890 foundation, as well as serving as the director of the Arts and Craft Gallery from 1899 to 1908 and head of the Artificers Guild from 1903 to 1906.

Fordham's main passion, however, was rural reform, and he formed the Land Club Union in 1908 which aimed to establish model farms, organise farmers' banks and loans, provide machinery, and revive traditional life and festivals in the country. The following year, he published Mother Earth: A Proposal for the Permanent Reconstruction of our Country Life as an effective manifesto for the Union, with a foreword by John A. Hobson. The book attacked what he saw as the anti-farmer nature of the economic system; it also anticipated the modern organic movement by attacking modern methods. After the publication of this book, he became involved with a number of rural reform groups, such as the Agricultural Organisation Society and Land Clubs League, arguing in favour of his desire to see a return to small-holdings. He desired autarky in food production for all countries, while also highlighting the dangers of soil erosion caused by the concentration of agriculture in certain countries.

His 1924 book The Rebuilding of Rural England contained an attack on the existing monetary systems, and argued instead in favour of making money available as credit, thus indicating a link with Social Credit. His criticisms of the economic system of Britain became more marked after the 1931 slump.

He established the Rural Reconstruction Association in 1926 and served as its Council Secretary for 20 years, with the group at the forefront of the agricultural reform movement.

His son Michael Fordham became a noted psychiatrist.
