= Barchard =

Barchard is a surname. Notable people with the surname include:

- Des Barchard (1924–1987), New Zealand rugby league footballer
- Elphinstone Barchard (1827–1893), English barrister and cricketer
- Francis Barchard (1796–1856), English dyer
- Harry Barchard (1860–1935), English cricketer
- Len Barchard (1909–1975), New Zealand rugby league footballer
