= Lord Rupert Nevill =

English nobleman

Captain Lord Rupert Nevill CVO KStJ DL JP

Treasurer to Duke of Edinburgh
- In office 1970–1982
- Monarch: Elizabeth II
- Preceded by: Sir Christopher Bonham-Carter
- Succeeded by: Sir Richard Davies

Private Secretary to Duke of Edinburgh
- In office 1976–1982
- Preceded by: Cdr William Willett
- Succeeded by: Sir Richard Davies

Personal details
- Born: 29 January 1923
- Died: 19 July 1982 (aged 59)
- Spouse: Lady Anne Wallop (m. 1944)
- Children: Guy Nevill; Lady Angela Keating; Christopher Nevill, 6th Marquess of Abergavenny; Lady Henrietta Purbrick
- Parent(s): 4th Marquess of Abergavenny; Isabel Nellie Larnach
- Education: Eton College

Lord Rupert Charles Montecute Nevill CVO KStJ DL JP (29 January 1923 – 19 July 1982) was Chairman of the British Olympic Association from 1966 to 1977 and then its President until his death. As a courtier, he was treasurer and later private secretary to Prince Philip, Duke of Edinburgh, between 1970 and 1982. He was a close confidant, friend and associate to Elizabeth II and the Duke of Edinburgh.

== Early life ==
Nevill was born on 29 January 1923, the younger son of Guy Larnach-Nevill, 4th Marquess of Abergavenny, and his wife Isabel Nellie Larnach and was educated at Eton College.

== Career ==
During the Second World War, Lord Rupert Nevill gained the rank of captain in the Life Guards. He served as aide-de-camp to Lieutenant-General Sir Brian Horrocks during the allied advance in 1945 and continued as aide-de-camp after the war until 1947.

Nevill served as Chairman of the British Olympic Association from 1966 to 1977 and as its President from 1977 until his death in 1982, being succeeded in this role by Anne, Princess Royal. He was President of the British Show Jumping Association between 1973 and 1976.

Nevill was also President of the Metropolitan Union of the YMCA from 1956, a member of the World Council of the YMCA from 1956, vice-chairman of the National YMCA 1963-1966, and president from 1966. He was president of the East Grinstead and Uckfield branch of the RSPCA. He was also an ardent defender of fox hunting and member of the Eridge Hunt. In 1959, he resigned after a decision by the branch to offer a free service for gassing foxes by a qualified pest controller. The Council of the RSPCA responded by claiming the decision of the branch had not been made with any authority or prior consultation.

He was a member of the Uckfield Rural District Council (1949–1967) and of East Sussex County Council (1954–1967), a Justice of the Peace of Sussex from 1953, and a Deputy Lieutenant of Sussex from 1960. He was High Sheriff of Sussex for 1952–1953. He was a member of the Sussex St John's Council from 1952 and chairman from 1966.

Nevill was treasurer to the Prince Philip, Duke of Edinburgh from 1970 to 1982 and his private secretary from 1976 to 1982. He was one of the godfathers of Princess Margaret’s son David Armstrong-Jones, 2nd Earl of Snowdon.

== Personal life ==
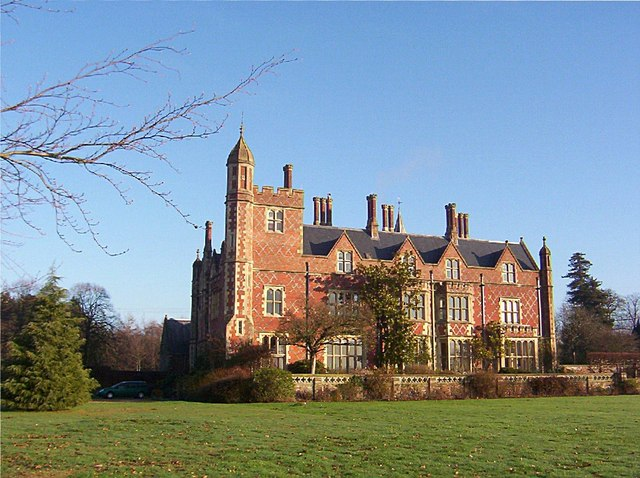
Horsted Place

On 22 April 1944, Nevill married Lady Anne Camilla Evelyn "Micky" Wallop (12 July 1925 – 25 January 2023; aged 97) a daughter of Gerard Vernon Wallop, 9th Earl of Portsmouth and Mary Lawrence Post. Both Nevill and his wife were childhood friends of Queen Elizabeth II. They lived at Horsted Place and were sometimes referred to at court as ‘the little people’ because of their small stature.

The Nevills had four children:

- Guy Rupert Gerard Nevill (29 March 1945 – 5 February 1993; aged 47), godson of Elizabeth II; he married Lady Beatrix Mary Lambton, daughter of Antony Lambton, 6th Earl of Durham.
- Lady Angela Isabel Mary Nevill (born 2 January 1948), a bridesmaid at the wedding of Princess Margaret and Antony Armstrong-Jones; married William Keating (died 4 November 1998) on 12 March 1994.
- Christopher George Charles Nevill, 6th Marquess of Abergavenny (born 23 April 1955), married Venetia V. Maynard and had twins.
- Lady Henrietta Emily Charlotte Nevill (born 21 June 1964), goddaughter of Prince Philip, Duke of Edinburgh; married Lt. Col. Timothy Purbrick. They have four children.

Lord Rupert Nevill died on 19 July 1982, aged 59. A memorial service was held at St Margaret's Westminster, and he was buried at Holy Trinity Church, Eridge.

== Honours ==
He was vested as a Knight of the Most Venerable Order of the Hospital of St. John of Jerusalem (K.St.J.) in 1972, and he was appointed a Commander of the Royal Victorian Order (C.V.O.) in 1978.
