= Lady Anne Wallop =

British aristocrat and confidante of Elizabeth II

Lady Anne Camilla Eveline "Micky" Nevill (née Wallop; 12 July 1925 – 25 January 2023) was a British aristocrat and confidante of Elizabeth II.

== Early life ==
Lady Anne was born at Ellisfield, Hampshire, the second daughter of Gerard Wallop (later the Earl of Portsmouth) and his first wife, Mary Lawrence Post. Her parents were both born in the United States; her paternal grandfather Oliver was a horse breeder in the American West in the late 1800s and remained there even after inheriting the Earldom.

Two months after her birth, her great-grandfather the 7th Earl of Portsmouth died, and her father was styled Viscount Lymington until he inherited the earldom. From 1929–34, he was a Member of Parliament for Basingstoke parliamentary constituency, with the family home in Farleigh Wallop. Her parents divorced in 1936. The following year, she was one of a selection of aristocratic girls around the same age as the then-Princess Elizabeth, later to be Queen Elizabeth II, who was brought to Buckingham Palace to form the Guides group there. Anne, known by her middle name Camilla, and nicknamed "Micky" from this, had become a good friend of Elizabeth by World War II.

When she was 15 and living with her mother in London, their home was bombed; they moved to the Savoy Hotel with her maternal uncle.

== Marriage ==
In 1944, when she was 19, Lady Anne married Lord Rupert Nevill at St George's, Hanover Square. At the time, Rupert was one of the Life Guards serving as the personal bodyguard of King George VI. She was then often known as Lady Rupert Nevill. In the early years of their marriage, they lived at Uckfield House. They sold it in 1965 (it was subsequently demolished in 1974) and moved to Horsted Place, which Anne restored and renovated extensively. When Lord Rupert died in 1982, Anne moved to Glynde and Horsted Place was sold.

They were popular at court, and were sometimes affectionately referred to as "the little people", due to both being short. Well-versed as courtiers, they were often handed a role of making lively more dull events at court, and to make people feel more at ease around Elizabeth II at awkward events.

The couple had four children:

- Guy Rupert Gerard Nevill (29 March 1945 – 5 February 1993; aged 47), godson of Elizabeth II; he married Lady Beatrix Mary Lambton, daughter of Antony Lambton, 6th Earl of Durham.
- Angela Isabel Mary Nevill (born 2 January 1948), a bridesmaid at the wedding of Princess Margaret and Antony Armstrong-Jones; married William Keating (died 4 November 1998) on 12 March 1994.
- Christopher George Charles Nevill, 6th Marquess of Abergavenny (born 23 April 1955), married Venetia V. Maynard and had twins.
- Henrietta Emily Charlotte Nevill (born 21 June 1964), goddaughter of Prince Philip, Duke of Edinburgh; married Lt. Col. Timothy Purbrick. They have four children.

== Associations ==
After their childhood friendship, Anne remained close with Elizabeth. In 1946, Anne was the host of the first charity ball that Elizabeth attended. They remained close for the rest of Elizabeth's life, with one insider saying that Anne "probably knew more royal secrets than any other outsider". After ascending to the throne, Elizabeth and Philip would still frequently visit the Nevills, "reportedly [enjoying] a level of freedom during their trips", including going to places incognito; one friend said that "the Royal family come nearest to being ordinary people" at the Nevills' home. Anne's cousin Jean Herbert, Countess of Carnarvon was also a friend of Elizabeth.

Anne and Nevill had also been close to both Princess Margaret and Peter Townsend since before their affair, and "played a central role" when Margaret and Townsend separated.

The Nevills hosted Princess Anne at Uckfield House, serving as Princess Anne's home-away-from-home on the weekends while she boarded at the Benenden School in Kent.

In the 2004 Julian Fellowes fictional novel Snobs the character of the Marchioness of Uckfield is based on Anne. Though she rather liked Fellowes, a distant relative, she was unimpressed with how she was depicted. When Anne died, Fellowes said: "I will miss her tremendously, we had been friends for more than half a century. In fact, she was one of the main influences in my life. Her knowledge, her judgment, her taste, were all extraordinary, and I consider knowing her as one of my greatest blessings."

== Charity ==
Anne was fond of the area of East Sussex where she lived, and worked with various charities in the area.
