= Waterpark Hall =

Listed building in Broughton, Salford, England

- Location within Greater Manchester

General information
- Type: Congregational church (1874–1972); United Reformed Church (1972–c. 1980); Vacant (c. 1980–2003); Residential (2003–present)
- Architectural style: Decorated Gothic
- Location: Montpellier Mews, Broughton Park, Salford, England
- Coordinates: 53.5156°N 2.2549°W
- Year built: 1872–1874; 152 years ago

Design and construction
- Architect: S. W. Daukes
- Main contractor: Southern & Son

Listed Building – Grade II*
- Official name: Waterpark Hall (former Congregational church, latterly United Reformed Church)
- Designated: 18 January 1980
- Reference no.: 1386187

Waterpark Hall is a Grade II* listed building on Montpellier Mews in Broughton Park, an area within Salford, England. Designed by S. W. Daukes and constructed between 1872 and 1874 as a Congregational church, later used by the United Reformed Church, it closed in 1980 and remained vacant for over two decades before being converted to residential use in 2003.

== History ==
The church was built to serve the growing Congregational community in Broughton Park during the late 19th century. Designed by S. W. Daukes, it was constructed between 1872 and 1874 by the contractors Southern & Son of Salford. Although built for a Nonconformist congregation, the building was noted at the time for its strong resemblance to contemporary Anglican Gothic Revival churches.

In 1972 the Congregational and Presbyterian churches combined to form the Broughton Park United Reformed Church, and the building continued in use as a place of worship.

On 18 January 1980, Waterpark Hall was designated a Grade II* listed building.

Declining congregations led to the church's closure around 1980. A local resident purchased the building to prevent possible demolition, but attempts to secure an alternative use acceptable to Salford City Council were initially unsuccessful. The empty church was included on the Heritage at Risk Register for many years, during which its condition deteriorated through weathering and vandalism. In 1999 a proposal to restore the building and convert the site for residential use finally gained approval. Completed in 2003, the scheme added nine houses within the grounds, arranged in the manner of a traditional close, while the church itself was converted into flats with the nave forming a communal space.

== Architecture ==
The building is constructed of coursed and squared rubble with a Welsh slate roof laid in scalloped bands and finished with ridge cresting. It is designed in the Decorated Gothic style and follows a conventional plan comprising a nave, aisles, transepts, a northern vestry and office range, and a southeast tower and spire. The three‑stage tower has foiled windows, paired bell‑chamber lights with clustered shafts, angle buttresses with gablets, heavy pinnacles to the flying buttresses, and a spire with lucarnes rising to nearly 200 feet (61 m). The west doorway incorporates polished granite shafts and ball‑flower ornament to the moulded arch beneath a steep hood mould, with paired lights above.

The south side of the nave contains a five‑light rose window, while the west aisle has paired lancets above a trefoiled arched doorway; the aisles each have three three‑light windows. The transepts are marked by angle buttresses and a four‑light foiled window. To the north is a triple‑gabled range with blind arcading on shafts with foliate capitals, inset lancets, and a ball‑flower cornice; the east wall has three lancet windows, the central north gable a five‑light rose window, and the right‑hand gable a three‑light rose window. The left-hand gable includes a canted apsidal stair‑turret, with a two‑tier raking stone roof and cusped hood moulds to the lancet openings.

== See also ==
- Grade II* listed buildings in Greater Manchester
- Listed buildings in Salford
