= Samuel Daukes =

English architect

Samuel Whitfield Daukes (1811–1880) was an English architect, based in Gloucester and London.

== Family background ==
Daukes was born in London in 1811, the son of Samuel Whitfield Daukes, a businessman with coal mining and brewery interests, who bought Diglis House, Worcester in 1827.

== Career ==
Daukes was articled about 1827 to James Pigott Pritchett of York, and had set himself up in practice in Gloucester by 1834.

His practice also extended to Cheltenham, as his name appears in a list of architects working there in 1841, the year he took into partnership John R. Hamilton. From 1839 to 1842 Daukes was architect to the Birmingham and Gloucester Railway, designing clerks' houses, engine sheds, brakesmen's cottages and, in 1840, Lansdown station in Cheltenham. He was also architect to the London, Oxford and Cheltenham Railway Company. Between 1842 and 1848, when he started a London office at 14 Whitehall Place, he built up a very large practice in the English midlands. On starting the London office, a move probably prompted by his growing reputation and more specifically by winning the competition to design the 2nd Middlesex County Asylum which became known as the Colney Hatch Lunatic Asylum, the Gloucester practice took into partnership James Medland (1808–94), who had been a fellow pupil of Daukes in Pritchett's office in York, and changed its name to Hamilton & Medland. In about 1850, Hamilton emigrated to New York.

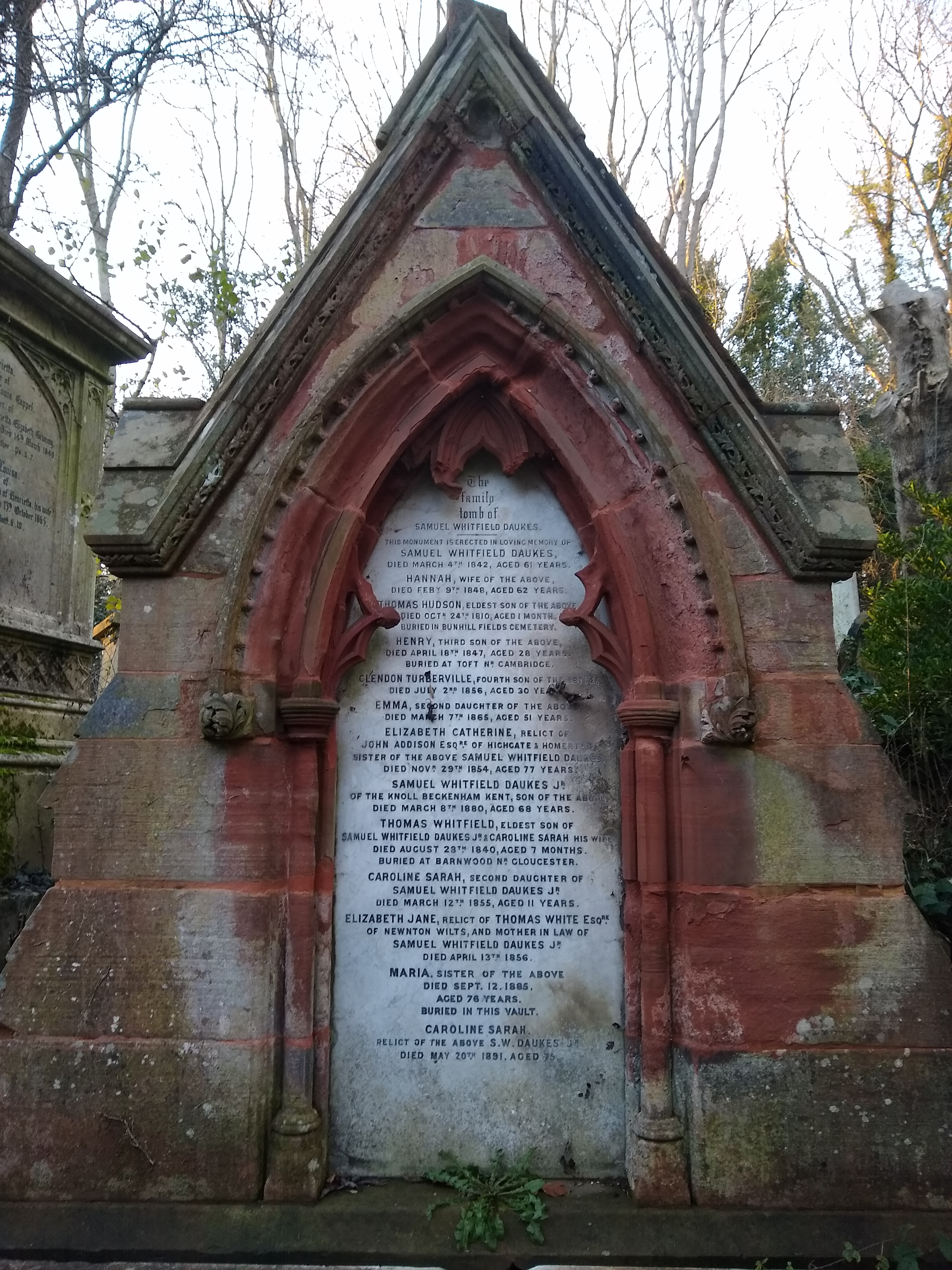
Vault of the Daukes family in Highgate Cemetery (West side)

His early practice would appear to have been assisted by his family's connections, and a link with his future patron, Lord Ward, is provided by his uncle, Richard Davies, who was Lord Ward's mining agent. His family's good financial standing no doubt also enabled him to purchase the Park estate in Cheltenham in 1839, and to develop it in the tradition of speculators such as Pearson Thompson and Joseph Pitt. Daukes was a convinced eclecticist, working in all the styles that were fashionable in his day. He was an admirer of Pugin and a long-term member of the Ecclesiological Society, although a low churchman and not wholly in sympathy with the ecclesiological movement, as he designed churches in the neo-Norman and Perpendicular styles. He was able to use these styles and also the Italianate of Abberley Hall, Witley Court and Colney Hatch, with considerable originality and dash, and he comes across as an architect full of self-confidence, with a secure command of the Picturesque elements of a composition. He failed, however, to adapt to the changing stylistic climate of the High Victorian period, and in the 1860s his practice seems to have declined, although he was still building churches in the Midlands.

Daukes' pupils included Joseph James (before 1854) and Frederick Hyde Pownall.

== Death ==
Daukes died at Beckenham (Kent) in 1880, and was buried in the family vault in Highgate Cemetery. Attached to his will was a list of all the architectural books in his office, an eclectic selection, including Weale's Quarterly Papers in Architecture as well as all Pugin's publications, and the Transactions of the Cambridge Camden Society; but the charities to which he left money were all low church.

== Personal life ==
In 1836, Daukes married Caroline Sarah White of Long Newnton (then Wilts, now Glos). By 1840 they were apparently living at Barnwood, on the edge of Gloucester. A portrait of the Daukes and their five children by A. de Salomé was exhibited at the Royal Academy in 1853.

== List of major works ==
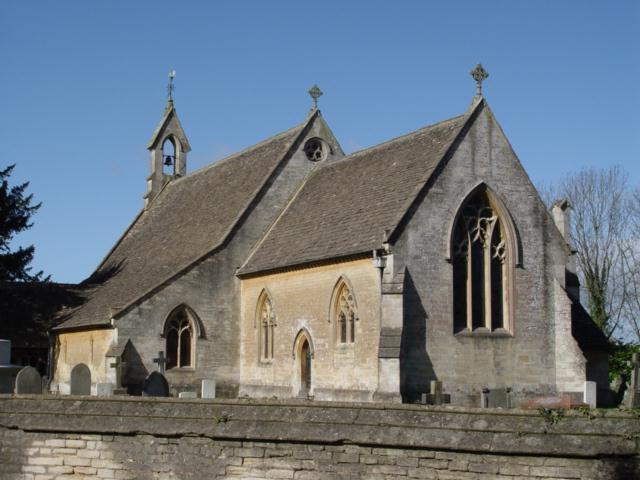
St Saviour's Church, Tetbury

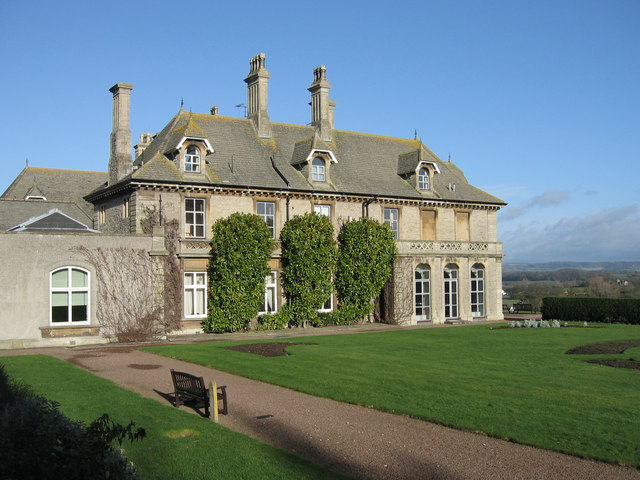
Eastwood Park, Falfield

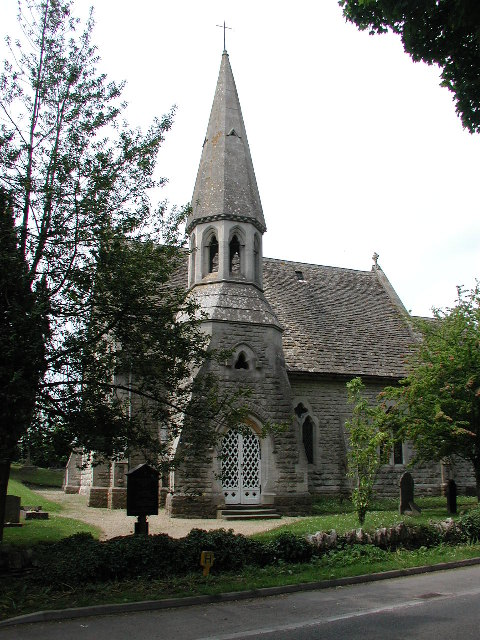
St John the Baptist's Church, Edge

- The Park Estate, Cheltenham, Gloucestershire: layout of estate and zoological gardens for Thomas Billings, 1833–34; Daukes purchased the estate in 1839 and began to design villas for erection on a speculative basis, mostly Greek Revival but including Tudor Lodge (demolished c. 1966) and perhaps Cornerways, c. 1865, Italianate
- Abberley Hall, Worcestershire: for J. L. Moilliet, 1837, Italianate; destroyed by fire, 1845, and reconstructed to a modified design, 1846–1849 for Mrs. Moilliet; altered c. 1883
- Building at Sidcot School (Somerset): 1838. Won by competition. This is the oldest surviving part of the school.
- Warehouses at Gloucester Docks: 1838–1840, Classical
- Registry Office, Thornbury, (Glos.): 1839, Greek Revival
- Lansdown Railway Station, Cheltenham, (Glos.): for Birmingham & Gloucester Railway Company, 1840, Italianate; portico removed, 1960s
- Holy Trinity Church, West Bromwich, Staffordshire: 1840–41, Gothic Revival
- Tibberton Court, (Glos.): 1842, for W. P. Price, alterations planned but perhaps unexecuted
- Mount Eldon, Clevedon, Somerset: for Dowager Lady Elton, 1844, Tudor
- St John's Church, Wednesbury, (Staffs.): 1844–1846, Gothic
- St Andrew's Church, Wells Street, London: 1844–1847, Gothic, taken down and rebuilt at Kingsbury (Middx.) by W. A. Forsyth, 1934
- Houses and shops, 1–19 Montpellier Street, Cheltenham, (Glos.): c. 1844–1851
- Royal Agricultural College, Cirencester, (Glos.): 1845–1848, Tudor, selected as winning design in architectural competition
- St Saviour's Church, Tetbury, (Glos.): 1845–1848, Gothic Revival; the clergy house (27–29 Church St.) is also attributed to Daukes
- St Peter's Church, Cheltenham, (Glos.): 1846–1849, Norman Revival
- Lypiatt Terrace, Cheltenham, (Glos.): 1847, Italianate
- Middlesex County Pauper Lunatic Asylum, Colney Hatch: 1847–1851, Italianate, selected as winning design in an architectural competition, now converted into housing
- Holy Trinity Church, Brompton, Kent: 1848, Gothic, demolished 1956
- Bricklehampton Hall, (Worcs.): 1848, Italianate, for Francis Woodward,
- The Abbey Hotel, Great Malvern, (Worcs.): 1848–49, Jacobean
- St Paul's College, Cheltenham, (Glos.): 1848–1850, Gothic Revival, for the Church of England Training Institution,
- Smallpox and Vaccination Hospital, Highgate Hill, (Middx.): 1848–1850, Italianate
- St James' Church, Gravesend, Kent: 1848–1852, Gothic Revival
- Lincoln County Pauper Lunatic Asylum, Bracebridge Heath, (Lincs.): 1849, Italianate
- Leybourne Grange, Kent: 1850s, Italianate
- Holy Trinity Church, Link Top, Great Malvern, (Worcs.): 1850–51, Gothic Revival, enlarged 1872
- Horsted Place, Sussex: 1850–1852, Tudor, for Francis Barchard
- Holy Ascension Church, Oddington, (Glos.): 1850–1852, Gothic Revival
- Christ Church, Hampstead, (Middx.): 1851–52
- Aged Freemason's Asylum, now Davidson Lodge, Croydon, Surrey: 1852, Jacobean
- St Thomas' Minster, Newport, Isle of Wight: 1854–1856, Gothic Revival
- Dudley House, Westminster, Park Lane, (Middx.): 1855, new ballroom and picture gallery for Lord Ward; damaged in WW2 but restored by Sir Basil Spence, 1969–70
- Great Witley Church, (Worcs.): c. 1855, refacing in ashlar and new furnishings for Baron Foley
- Eastwood Park, Falfield, (Glos.): c. 1858–1862, Italianate, attributed, new house for Sir G. S. Jenkinson,
- St George's Church, Falfield, (Glos.): 1859–60, Gothic Revival
- Witley Court, (Worcs.): 1859–61, Italianate, alterations and refronting for Lord Ward; burnt out 1937 but now restored as a shell
- Harescombe Grange, (Glos.): 1861–1864, Tudor, for W. C. Lucy, a Gloucester corn merchant; addition of north front, c. 1875, is also attributed to Daukes
- Guiting Grange, (Glos.): c. 1862, Italianate, attributed, additions and refronting for John Waddington,
- St John the Baptist Church, Edge, (Glos.): 1865, Gothic Revival
- All Saints Church, Hoole Road, Chester, Cheshire: 1867, Gothic Revival
- Five detached houses for Albemarle Cator, The Knoll, Beckenham, Kent, 1871
- Upper Park Road Congregational Church, Salford, Lancashire (now Greater Manchester): 1872–74, Gothic Revival
- Five houses bounded by 25 Kensington Gore and 200 Queen's Gate, Kensington, (Middx.): 1873
- St Paul's Church, New Beckenham, Kent: date unknown

== Bibliography ==
- The Builder, 20 Mar. 1880, p. 366 and 22 May 1880, p. 650
- Country Life, 6–13 Dec. 1973
- N. W. Kingsley & M. Hill, The Country Houses of Gloucestershire: volume 3, 1830–2000, 2001
- D. Verey & A. Brooks, The Buildings of England: Gloucestershire 2 – the Vale and the Forest of Dean, 2002
