= Horsted Place =

Coordinates: 50°56′48.42″N 0°5′22.15″E

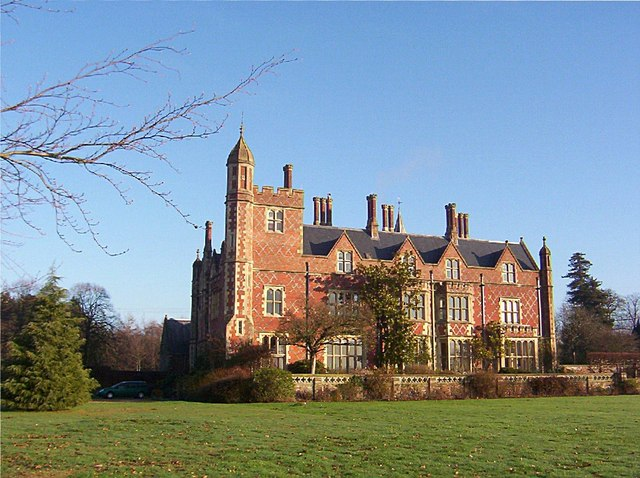
Horsted Place

Horsted Place is a Tudor Revival country house, now a hotel, in Little Horsted, East Sussex, England. The current building dates to 1850, when it was built by Samuel Daukes/George Myers for Francis Barchard, a successful merchant from London, though an earlier house evidently existed as it was documented as being owned by the Law family in 1816. It is described as "A masterpiece of ornate Victorian Gothic, it has towers, tall brick chimneys and a great central Gallery running through its entire length."

Horsted Place is listed Grade II on the National Heritage List, and its gardens are also listed Grade II on the Register of Historic Parks and Gardens.

== Barchard family ==
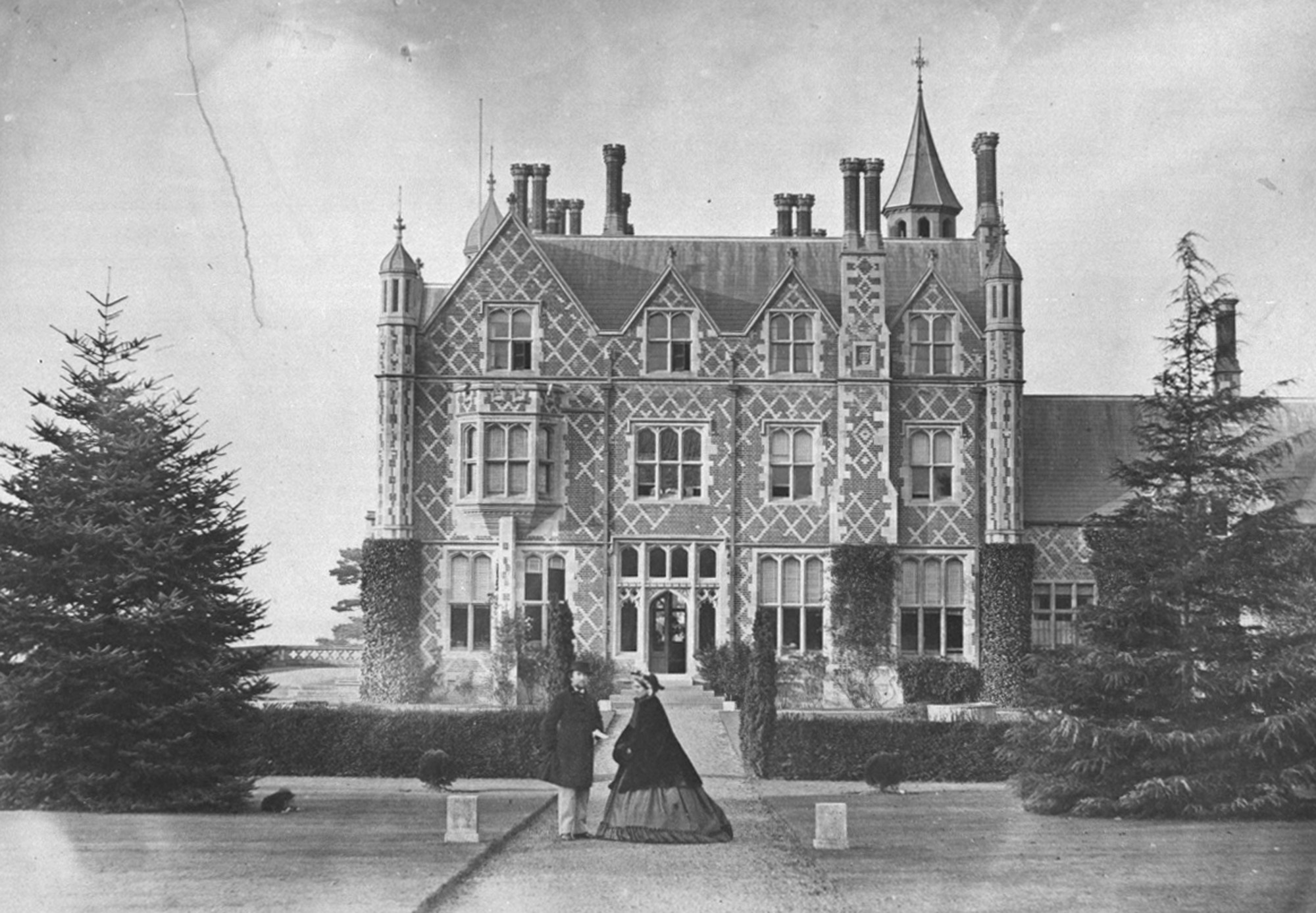
Horsted Place circa 1860. The couple in front are Arentina Barchard and Francis Barchard (1826–1904) who owned the house at this time.

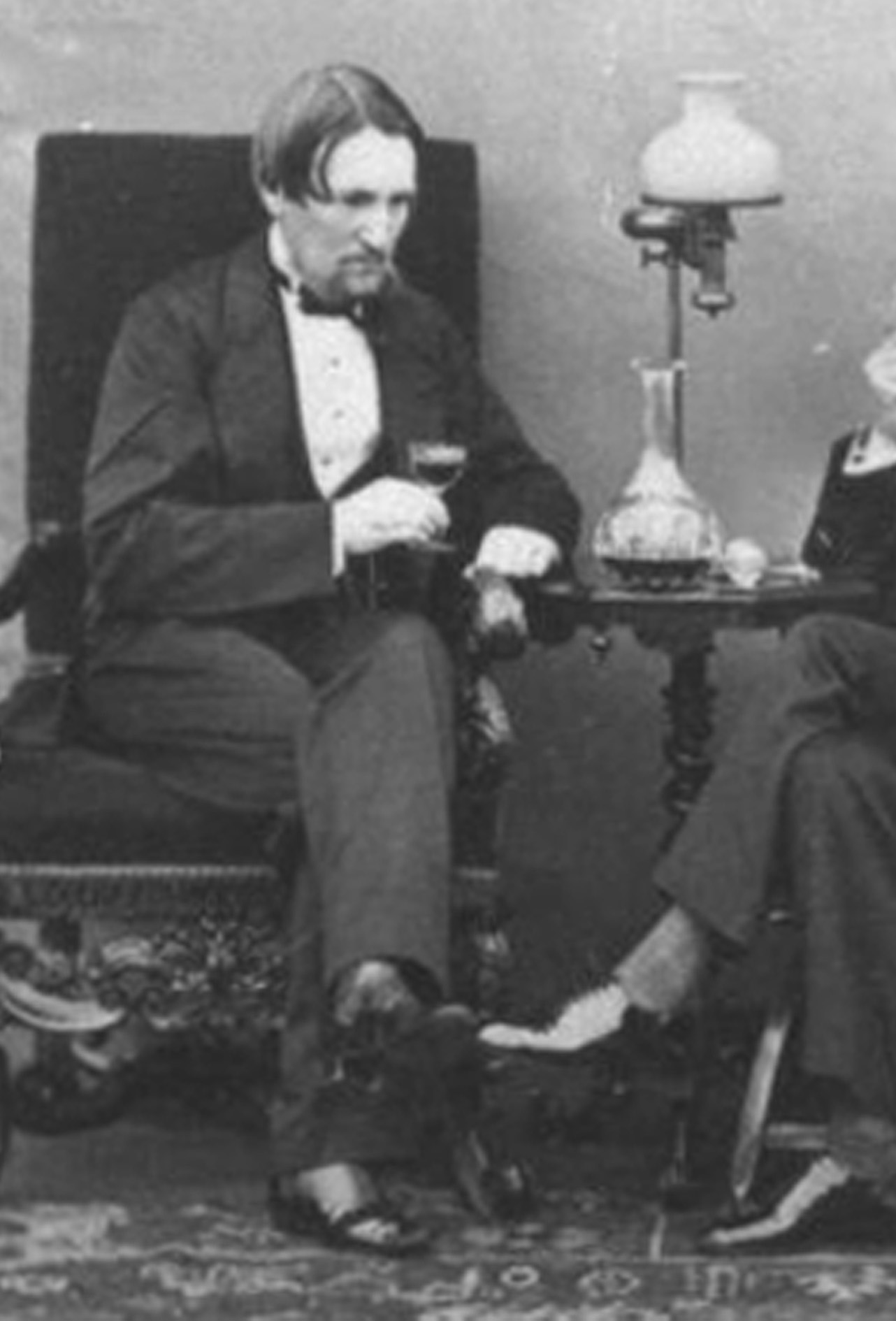
Francis Barchard (1826–1904)

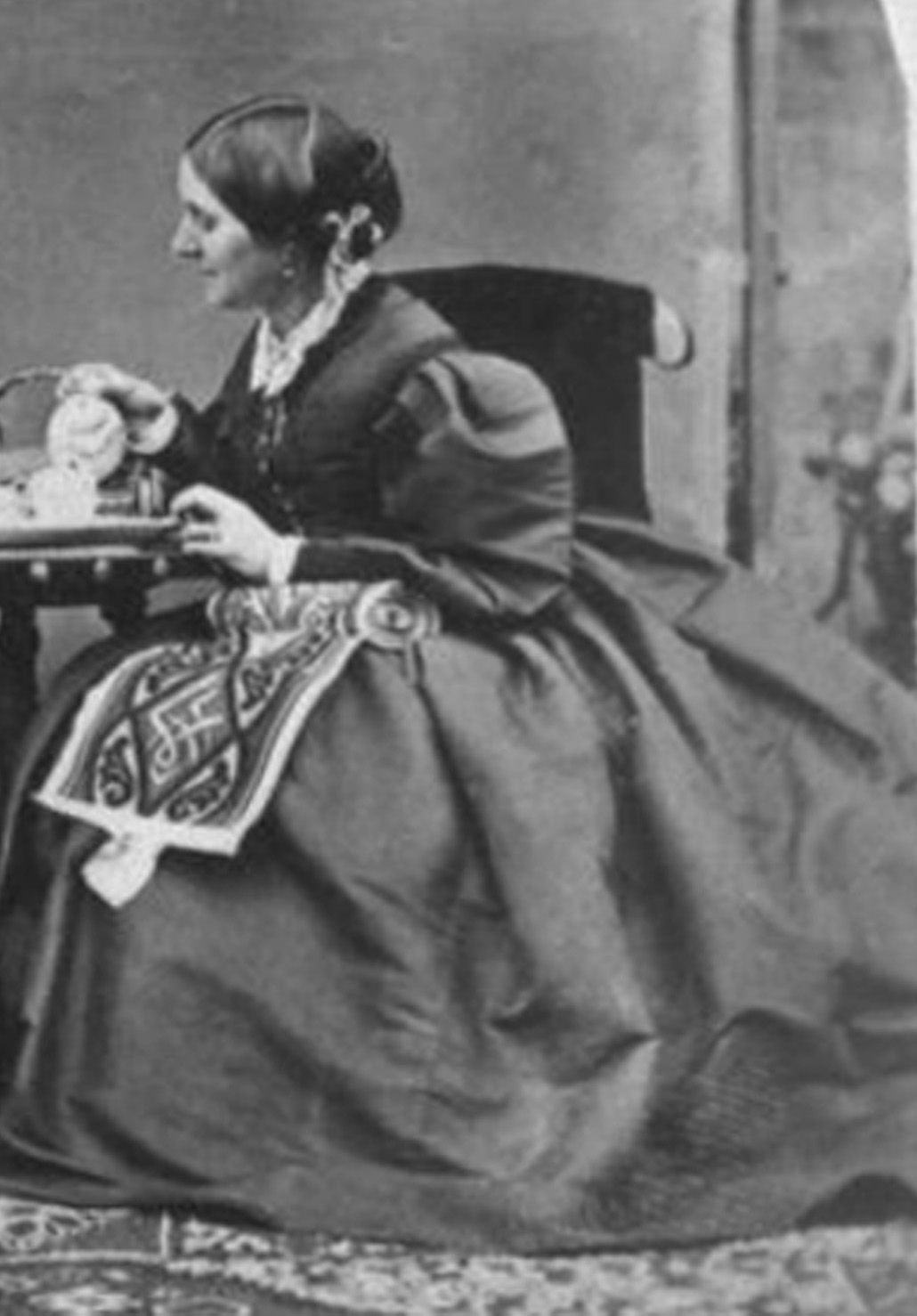
Arentina Barchard

Francis Barchard (1796-1856) built Horsted Place in about 1850. Barchard was son of Joseph and Jane Barchard. The Barchard family, originally Yorkshire yeomen, established a successful business as dyers in London. This business made Francis Barchard prosperous; additionally, his godfather Francis Hilton was a wealthy dyer, who at his death in 1845 left Barchard approximately 200,000 pounds (worth around 18 million pounds in 2014). With this newfound wealth Barchard began to build Horsted Place.

On Barchard's death in 1856, Horsted Place was inherited by his eldest son, Francis (1826-1904). An Oxford-educated barrister, Francis married but had no children. On his death in 1904 his nephew, Francis (1863-1932), another Oxford-educated barrister, inherited the property. This third Francis married and had a son and a daughter; the son was killed in the Second World War. After Francis died in 1932, his widow remained at Horsted Place until her death in 1964. The following year the property was sold to Lord Rupert Nevill.

== Lord and Lady Rupert Nevill ==
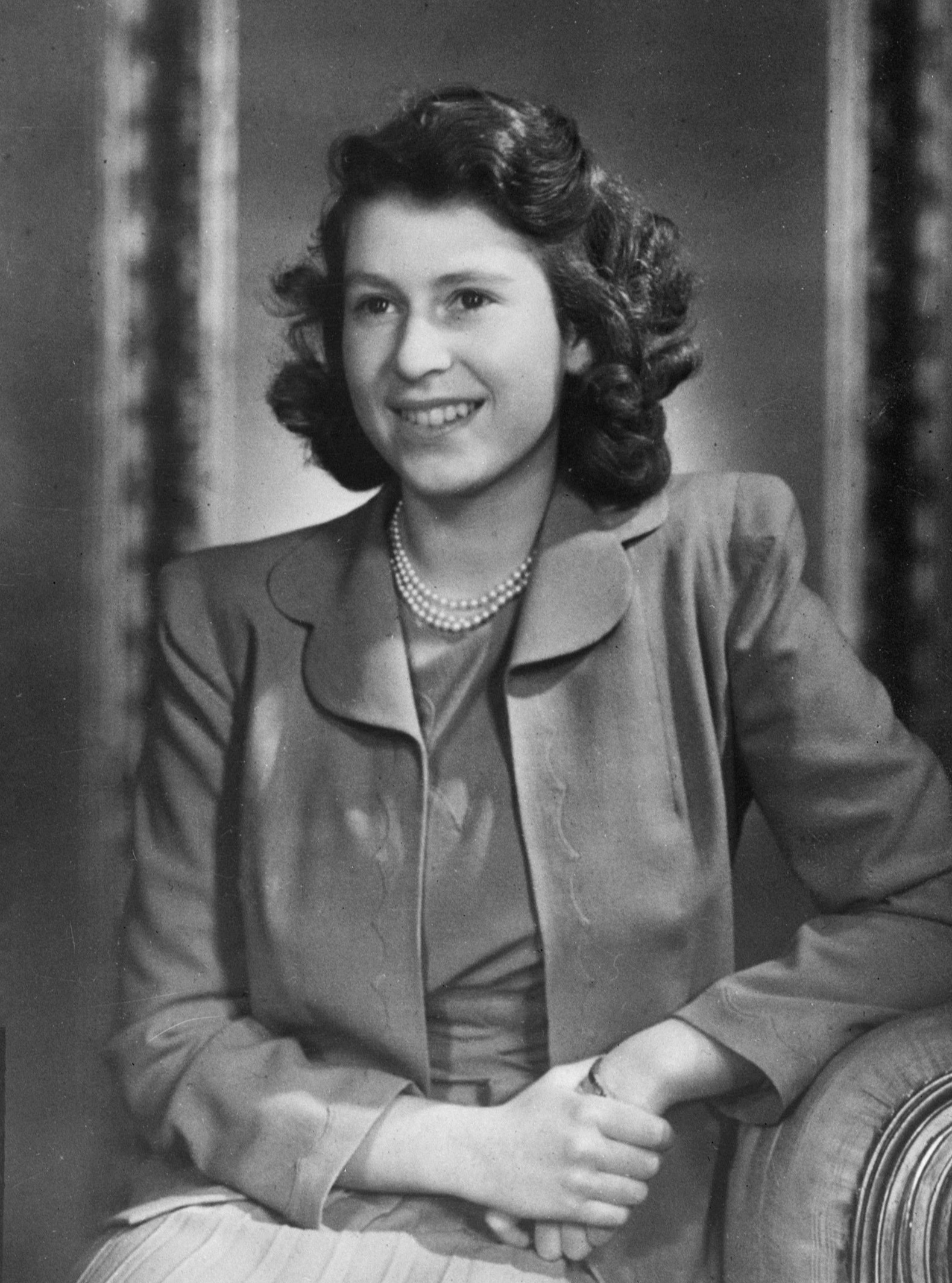
Princess Elizabeth

Lady Rupert Nevill was a personal childhood friend of Queen Elizabeth II. She was born Lady Anne Camilla Wallop (nickname Micky) and her father was The 9th Earl of Portsmouth. She was in the same Girl Guide Group as Princess Elizabeth and they had become lifelong friends. In 1944 she married Lord Rupert Nevill, who was the second son of Major The 4th Marquess of Abergavenny.

The couple lived at Uckfield House (now demolished) which was not far from Little Horsted. During that time they had numerous visits from the Royal Family. They had four children, two sons and two daughters. Queen Elizabeth became the godmother for the first time for their infant son in 1945.

In 1965 they bought Horsted Place and Queen Elizabeth and Prince Philip continued to visit them there. In 1970 he became the Treasurer for Prince Philip then in 1975 he became his Private Secretary. In 1982 Lord Rupert Nevill died and soon after Horsted Place was converted to a hotel. It still serves this function.
