= Christopher Nevill, 6th Marquess of Abergavenny =

British peer

The Most Honourable The Marquess of Abergavenny OStJ DL
- Marquess of Abergavenny
- Tenure: 23 February 2000–present
- Predecessor: John Nevill, 5th Marquess of Abergavenny
- Other titles: 10th Earl of Abergavenny; 6th Earl of Lewes; 10th Viscount Nevill; 26th Baron Abergavenny
- Born: Christopher George Charles Nevill; 23 April 1955 (age 71)
- Residence: Eridge Park
- Spouse: Venetia Maynard (m. 1985)
- Issue: George Rupert Gerard Nevill (deceased); Lady Sophie Alice Augusta Nevill
- Parents: Lord Rupert Nevill; Lady Camilla Anne Evelyn Wallop

Christopher George Charles Nevill, 6th Marquess of Abergavenny, OStJ, DL (born 23 April 1955) is a British hereditary peer and current head of the House of Neville.

== Early life and education ==
Abergavenny was born at Uckfield House, Uckfield, Sussex, the second son of Lord Rupert Nevill (1923–1982) and his wife, Lady Camilla Anne Evelyn Wallop (1925–2023), daughter of Gerard Wallop, 9th Earl of Portsmouth. His parents were close friends of the royal family. His grandfather Guy Larnach-Nevill, 4th Marquess of Abergavenny had died the year before his birth and was succeeded by his uncle John Nevill, 5th Marquess of Abergavenny (1914–2000). In 1965, his uncle's only son, Henry, Earl of Lewes, died of acute anemia at age 17, making Lord Rupert the heir presumptive to the marquessate.

He was educated at Harrow.

== Later life ==
Abergavenny succeeded to the marquessate and its subsidiary titles upon the death of his uncle, John Nevill, 5th Marquess of Abergavenny, on 23 February 2000.

Abergavenny was made Deputy Lieutenant of East Sussex in 2011.

Before moving into the Ecuadorean Embassy in London, Julian Assange was living in a cottage on Abergavenny's estate in Kent.

== Marriage and issue ==
In 1985, Abergavenny married Venetia Jane Gerard. In 1990 they had twins:

- George Rupert Gerard Nevill (27 June 1990 - 15 September 1990)
- Lady Sophie Alice Augusta Nevill (born 27 June 1990)

Lady Sophie is a musician who goes by the stage name Sophie Trilby.

The heir presumptive to the Abergavenny earldom is the present marquess's fourth cousin, Guy Michael Rossmore Nevill.

== Honours ==
- United Kingdom:
  - 25 May 2011: Officer (Brother) of the Most Venerable Order of the Hospital of Saint John of Jerusalem (OStJ).
  - 27 July 2005: Serving Brother of the Most Venerable Order of the Hospital of Saint John of Jerusalem.

== Arms ==
Coat of arms of Christopher Nevill, 6th Marquess of Abergavenny
Crest Out of a ducal coronet or a bull’s head proper, charged with a rose gules. Escutcheon Gules a saltire argent, charged with a rose of the field, barbed and seeded proper. Supporters On either side a bull argent, pied sable, armed, unguled, collared and chained or, the latter terminating in a staple or. Motto Ne vile velis (Form no mean wish). Badge A rose gules, barbed and seeded proper.

Peerage of the United Kingdom
Preceded by John Nevill	Marquess of Abergavenny; 2000–present	Incumbent
Orders of precedence in the United Kingdom
Preceded by The Most Hon. The Marquess of Normanby	Gentlemen; The Most Hon. The Marquess of Abergavenny	Succeeded by The Most Hon. The Marquess of Zetland
