= Richard Davies (courtier) =

Sir Richard Harries Davies KCVO CBE (28 June 1916 – 29 January 1995) was a member of the Household of the Duke of Edinburgh of the United Kingdom.

== Education ==
Davies was educated at Porth County School, and Cardiff Technical School. He graduated with a BSc, and was a Chartered Engineer (CEng) and a FIEE.

== Career ==
He was a member of the Scientific Civil Service 1939-1946, and was in the British Air Commission, Washington, DC, 1944-1945.

After World War II he joined Ferranti, and was vice-president of Ferranti Electric Ltd 1948-1963, and a director of Ferranti Ltd 1970-1976.

In 1977 he joined the Household of the Duke of Edinburgh as Assistant Private Secretary. He was acting Private Secretary and Treasurer following the death of Lord Rupert Nevill in 1982, and retired in 1984, when he became an Extra Equerry.

Davies was made a CBE in 1962, and a CVO in 1982. He was advanced to KCVO in 1984.
