= The Park, University of Gloucestershire =

Park in United Kingdom

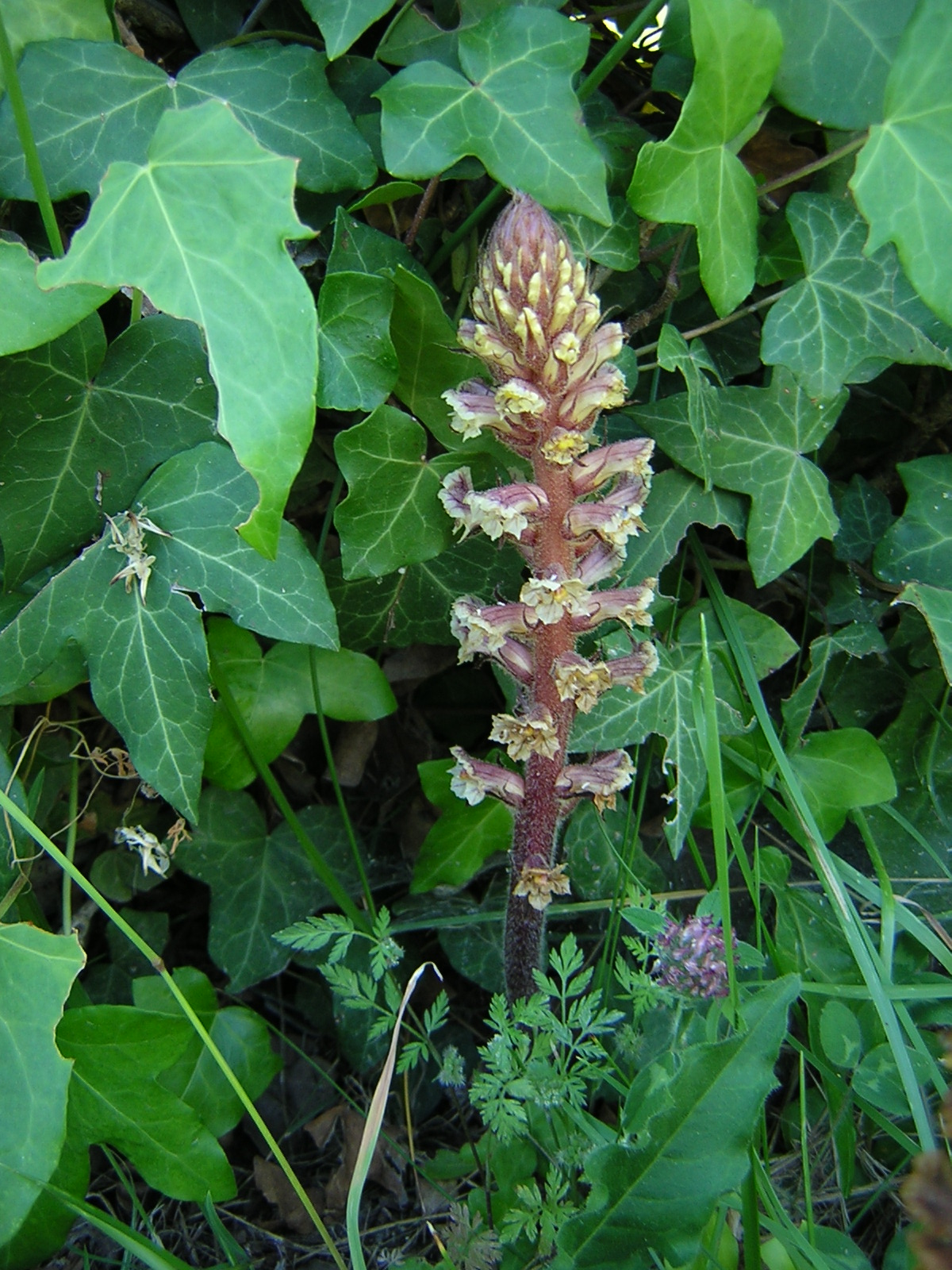
- Example - ivy broomrape (Orobanche hederae)

- Location within Gloucestershire
- Type: Community green space
- Location: Cheltenham
- Coordinates: 51°53′16.7″N 2°5′16.29″W
- Area: 23 acres (9.3 ha)
- Created: Partnership arrangements 2009
- Operator: University of Gloucestershire
- Status: Open all year

The Park, University of Gloucestershire (grid reference SO940210) is a 9.5-hectare (23-acre) community green space in Cheltenham, Gloucestershire.

The site is owned and managed by the University of Gloucestershire.

== History of The Park Estate ==
A local solicitor called Thomas Billings purchased the site in 1831 and put plans in train for Gloucestershire Zoological, Botanical and Horticultural Gardens. This was an ambitious project which eventually failed. It is reported that it was to be opened officially on the day of Queen Victoria's coronation in 1838. Elements of the original plans remain which include the Elephant Walk and the lake which is in the shape of Africa.

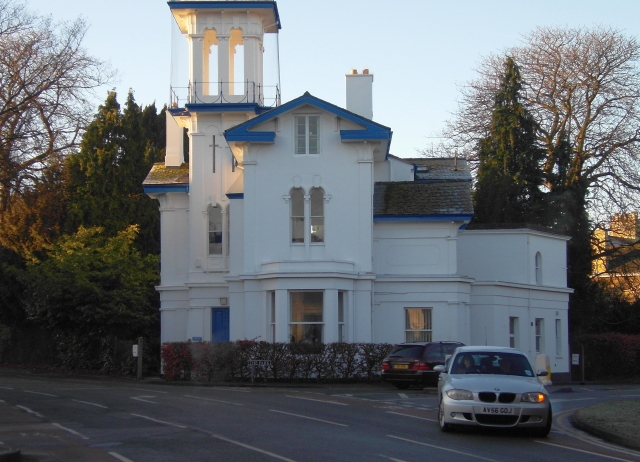
Cornerways building at the point of the teardrop, to be entrance to the Gardens

The Park is teardrop shaped and at the point of the teardrop is the building which was to be the entrance to the Gardens, which is called Cornerways and has a high tower. The original design included a grand promenade and a crescent of villas and was engraved by J. Fisher.

The site was sold to architect Samuel Whitfield Daukes in 1839. Dawkes developed The Park as 'pleasure grounds' and designed and had built the villas around it. There are a set of entrance gates which remain from this period, and Fullwood House in the grounds provides a point of interest within the landscape.

Daukes also designed a number of other buildings in Cheltenham.

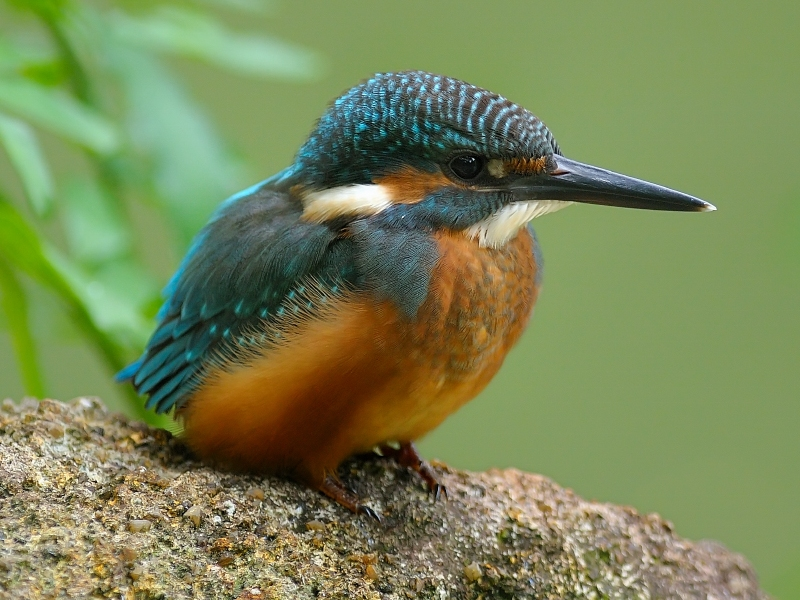
Example - common kingfisher (Alcedo atthis)

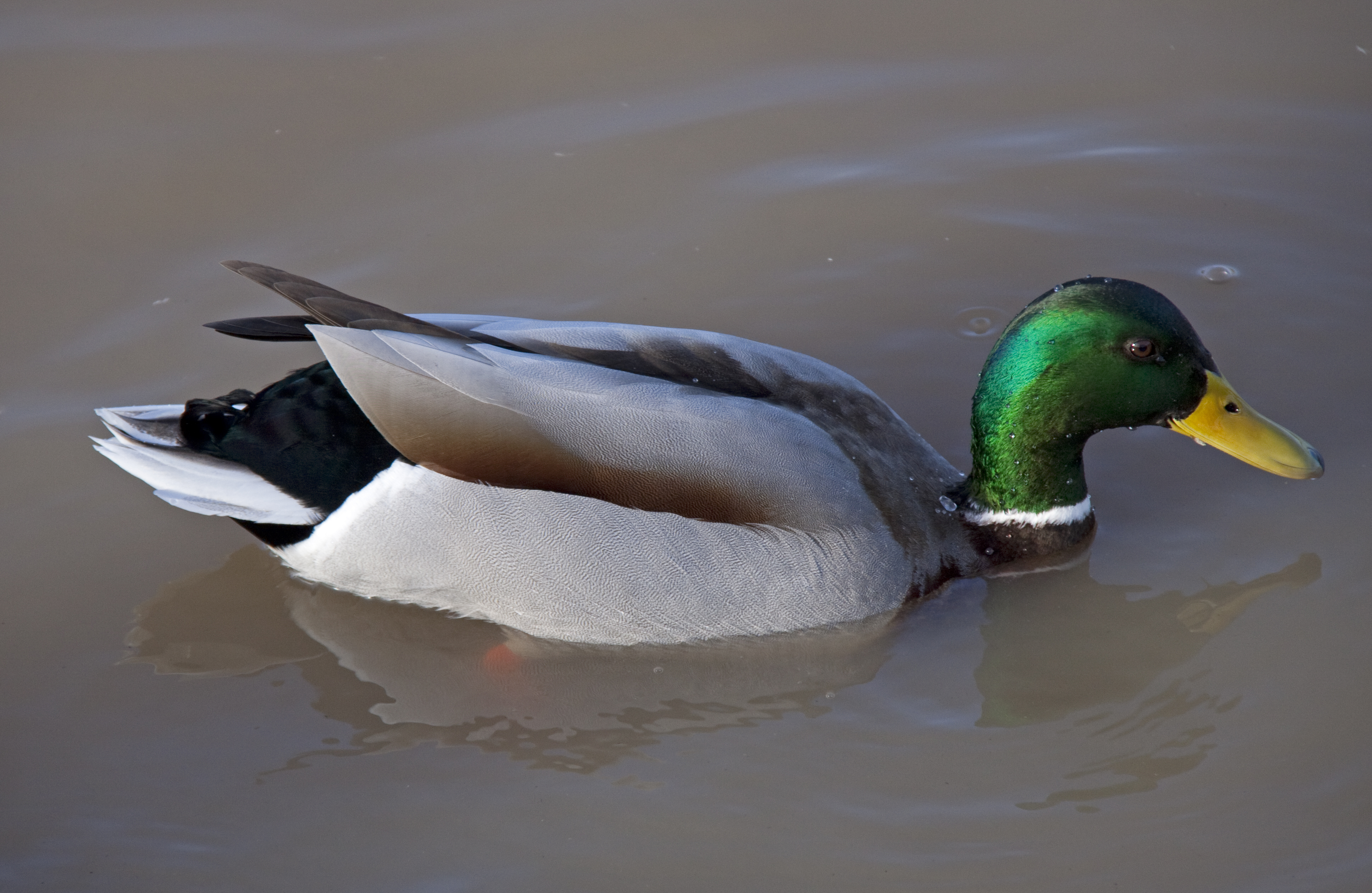
Example - mallard (Anas platyrhynchos)

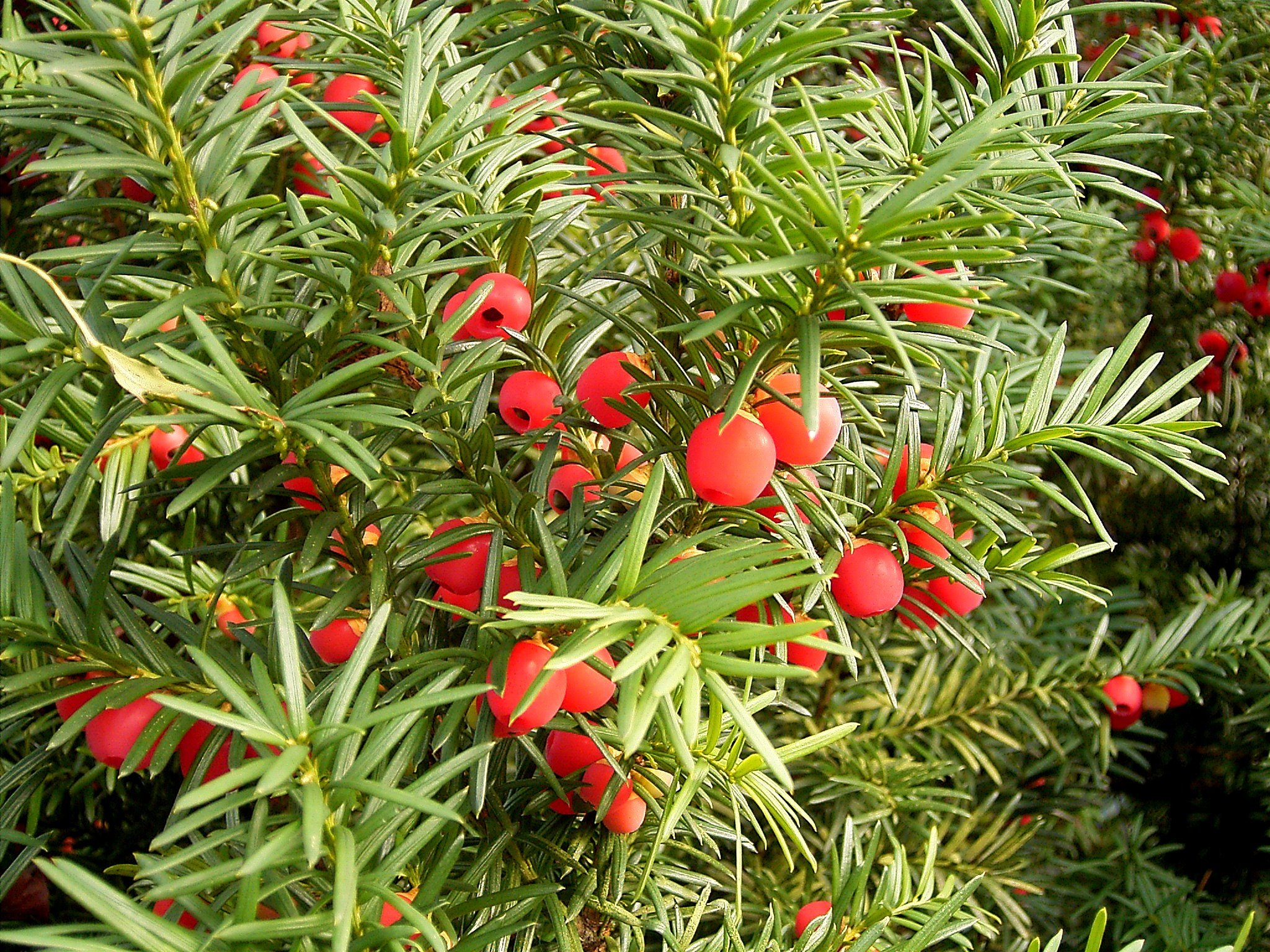
Example - European yew (Taxus baccata)

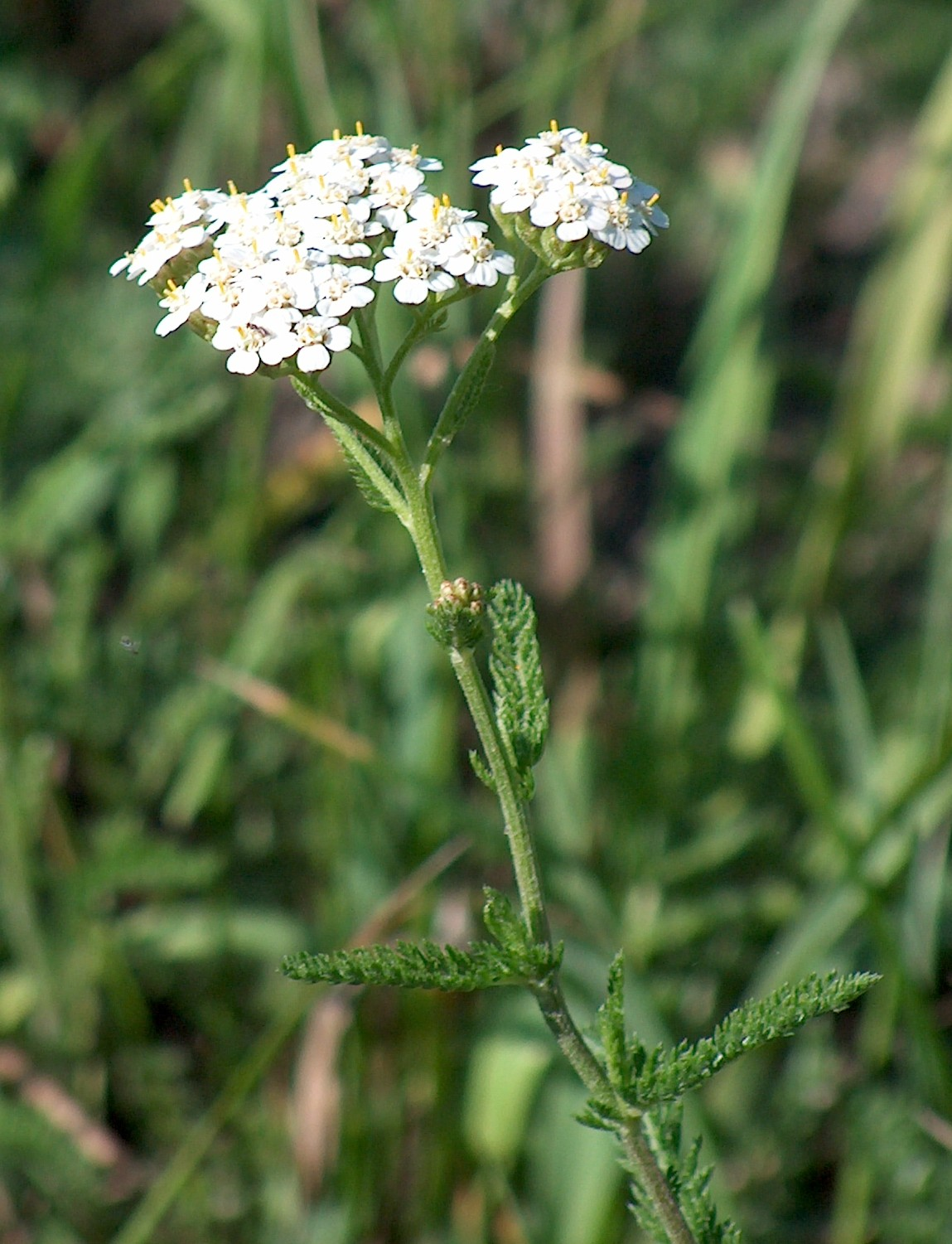
Example - yarrow (Achillea millefolium)

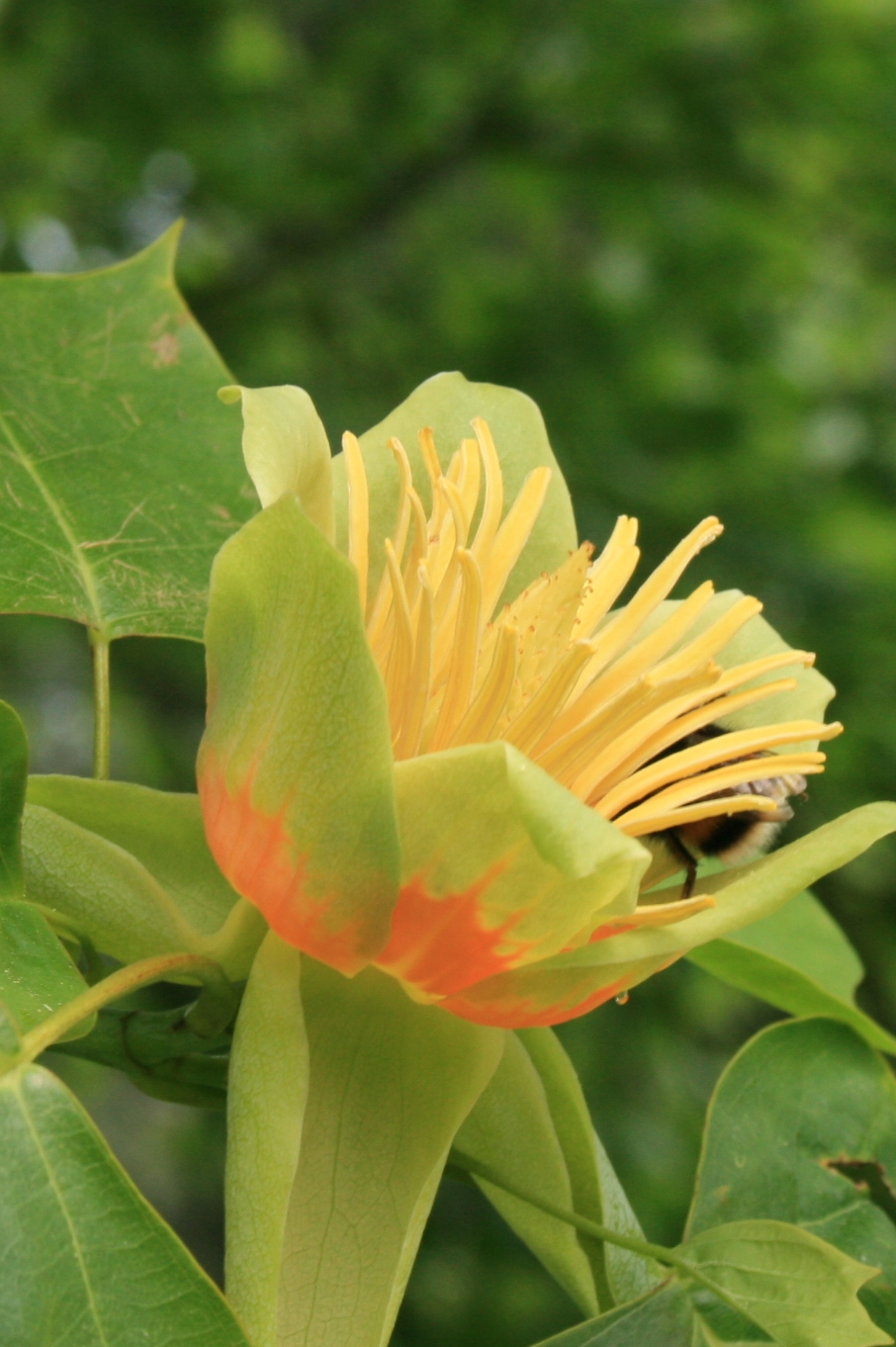
Example - tulip tree (Liriodendron-tulipifera)

A publication provides a graphical image of the teardrop layout, historical information and species information.

== Habitat ==
The site includes grassland meadow, wooded glades, shrubberies, and hedgerows. It has an ornamental lake. The site is relatively secluded and quiet. It attracts a range of fauna and supports interesting flora.

There are some 900 trees in The Park which are native and non-native species. This is considered to be a locally unique collection. Some of the trees date back to the early 1800s. They are generally numbered or marked with a small yellow dot. The trees have been obtained from different parts of the world including the United States of America and Europe. A publication details and illustrates a range of some 43 trees of interest and lists shrubs.

== Trees and shrubs ==
The trees include evergreen conifers, deciduous conifers and broad-leaved trees and are detailed in two publications. Evergreen conifers of interest include common yew (planted c. 1831), giant sequoia (planted c. 1889), cedar of Lebanon (planted c. 1944), cedars (planted c. 1979), blue Atlas cedar (planted c. 1969), and common oak (planted 1839 - 1859). Deciduous conifers of interest include dawn redwoods (planted c. 1989) and European larch. Broad-leaved trees include the tulip tree (planted c. 1964), false acacia or locust tree (planted c. 1869 - 1889), London plane (planted c. 1879) and strawberry tree (planted 1959).

Old hazel coppice stools exist in some of the shrubs borders.

== Flowers ==
An important species (nationally scarce) found on the site is ivy broomrape. This parasitic plant is already recorded in Gloucestershire in various localities. It grows on ivy. There are thick areas of 'Irish ivy' within the grounds. Wooded areas and hedgerow areas support hybrid bluebells (Hyacinthoides non-scripta and Hyacinthoides hispanica).

The meadow areas support a range of species which include red campion, primrose, nettle-leaved bellflower, enchanter's nightshade, garlic mustard, hedge woundwort, upright hedge parsley and green alkanet. The car park areas have been constructed of 'grass pavers' and support species such as yarrow, black medick and wild strawberry.

== Bird life ==
The ornamental lake, with its boathouse, is a focus for birds such as mallard and geese and the common kingfisher visits the site. The green woodpecker is a recorded species.

== Bats ==
The grounds and trees of The Park are home to various bat species.

== Walks ==
The community green space has interpretation boards, and defined walking areas for enjoyment of this open parkland with its meadow areas, woodland glades and lake. A publication supporting exploration of The Park is available online.

== Publications ==
- Hickey, M, 1991, 'Trees & Shrubs of The Park', Cheltenham & Gloucester College of Higher Education
- 'Exploring the grounds of The Park – The history and wildlife of this beautiful University of Gloucestershire site', (undated), Gloucestershire Wildlife Trust and University of Gloucestershire joint publication
- 'History of The Park Estate', April 2009, University of Gloucestershire/Gloucestershire Wildlife Trust
- ‘Nature Reserve Guide – discover the wild Gloucestershire on your doorstep’ - 50th Anniversary, January 2011, Gloucestershire Wildlife Trust
