= William Willett (Royal Navy officer) =

Commander William Basil Willett OBE MVO DSC (24 February 1919 – 1976) was Private Secretary to Prince Philip, Duke of Edinburgh, consort of Queen Elizabeth II 1970–1976.

== Biography ==
Willett was educated at Winchester College and the Britannia Royal Naval College, Dartmouth. He joined the Royal Navy in 1937. He was sailing master on the royal yacht Bloodhound 1967–1968.

Willett received the DSC in 1942. He was made an OBE in the 1965 New Year Honours and an MVO in 1969.

== Honours and awards ==
- 3 December 1940 - Mention in Dispatches - Sub-Lieutenant William Basil Willett, Royal Navy. For courage and resource in recent successful actions against Italian Submarines.
- 1 January 1965 - Officer of the Order of the British Empire (OBE) - Lieutenant Commander (Acting Commander) William Basil Willett, D.S.C., Royal Navy.
