= Francis Barchard =

English landowner

High Sheriff of Sussex in 1853

Personal details
- Born: 1796 Little Bookham, Surrey, England
- Died: 1856 (aged 59–60) Little Horsted, Sussex, England
- Spouse: Margaret Jane Piggott

Francis Barchard (1796–1856) was an English dyer who became a landowner in Sussex and served as High Sheriff of Sussex.

== Life ==
Baptised on 21 August 1796 at the church of All Saints in Little Bookham, he was the son of Joseph (1745–1831) and Jane Barchard. The family business was dyeing; Joseph Barchard's father, also Joseph (1711–1770), was of a family of Yorkshire yeomen, and became a successful dyer in London. This business made Francis Barchard prosperous; additionally, his godfather, Francis Hilton (1756–1845) was a wealthy dyer, who in his will left Barchard approximately 200,000 pounds (worth around 18 million pounds in 2014). In 1849 Barchard bought the estate of Horsted Place in Sussex and hired the architect Samuel Daukes to build the present Gothic house, in which his family continued to live until 1962. In 1853 he was appointed High Sheriff of Sussex. His will was proved in London on 16 April 1856.

== Family ==
On 28 October 1824 in the church of St George, Bloomsbury, he married Margaret Jane, daughter of Elphinstone Piggott, a Chief Justice of Tobago. Their eldest son Francis Barchard (1826–1904) married Arentina (1825–1909), daughter of John Watson, of Hove; her elder sister Jane was the second wife of landowner George Kirwan Carr Lloyd, himself sheriff in 1869.
