= Harry Barchard =

English cricketer

Harry George Barchard (25 June 1860 – 28 July 1935) was an English cricketer who played for Lancashire. He was born in Crumpsall, Manchester and educated at Uppingham School and died in Seaton, Devon.

Barchard made a single first-class appearance for the team, in 1888, against Oxford University. In two innings, Barchard scored 45 runs with the bat, and took one catch in the outfield. Barchard was a lower-order batsman for the team.

He married Constance Honoria Haye Maxwell and she died three weeks before he did in 1935.
