= Tim Purbrick =

British Army officer

Lieutenant Colonel Timothy Purbrick OBE VR
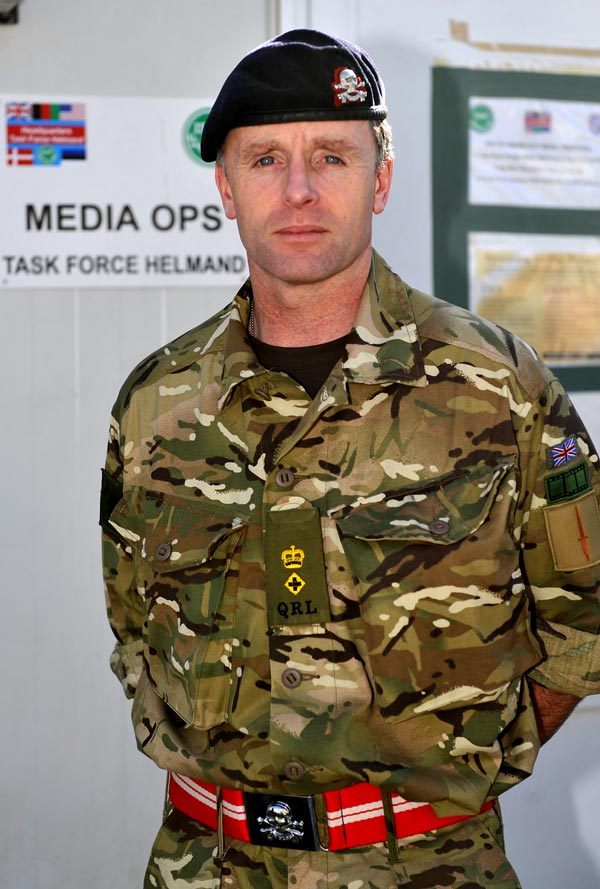
- Born: Timothy John Gerald Stevens Purbrick; 18 April 1964 (age 62)
- Alma mater: Eton College; Royal Military Academy Sandhurst; University of Edinburgh
- Spouse: Lady Henrietta Nevill (m. 1991)
- Children: 4
- Military career
- Allegiance: United Kingdom
- Branch: British army
- Rank: Lieutenant colonel
- Unit: Royal Lancers
- Commands: Cultural Property Protection Unit
- Conflicts: Operation Desert Storm

Lieutenant Colonel Timothy John Gerald Stevens Purbrick OBE VR FSA (born 18 April 1964) is a British Army officer of the Royal Lancers who took part in Operation Desert Storm.

== Early life ==
Purbrick was born in 1964, the son of William Purbrick.

== Career ==
Purbrick is the Commanding Officer of the British Cultural Property Protection Unit (CPPU), which was created in September 2018 in order for the British government to fulfil its obligations after it signed the Hague Convention for the Protection of Cultural Property in the Event of Armed Conflict (1954) in 2017.

== Personal life ==
In 1991, Purbrick married Henrietta Emily Charlotte Nevill (b. 21 June 1964), daughter of Lord Rupert Nevill, and a goddaughter of Prince Philip, Duke of Edinburgh. Henrietta was later granted the rank of a marquess's daughter in 2003. They have four children.

== See also ==
- Monuments Men
