= Elphinstone Barchard =

English cricketer

Personal information
- Born: 15 February 1827; Uckfield, Sussex
- Died: 19 October 1893 (aged 66); Duddleswell, Sussex
- Source: Cricinfo, 8 April 2017

Elphinstone Barchard (15 February 1827 – 19 October 1893) was an English barrister and cricketer. He played nine first-class matches for Cambridge University Cricket Club between 1846 and 1848.

He was born at Lewes, East Sussex, the second son of Francis Barchard of Horsted. His mother was Jane Piggott, daughter of Elphinstone Piggott, Chief Justice and a plantation owner on Tobago, and niece of Arthur Piggott. He was educated at Winchester College, and matriculated at Trinity College, Cambridge in 1845, graduating B.A. in 1849 and M.A. 1852. He was admitted to Lincoln's Inn in 1849, and was called to the bar there in 1853.

Barchard married in 1860 Catherine Barwell, daughter of Capt. Barwell R.N. of Brighton (elsewhere 1861, Katherine, Barwill).

== See also ==
- List of Cambridge University Cricket Club players
