= Grade II* listed buildings in City of Winchester =

There are over 20,000 Grade II* listed buildings in England. This page is a list of these buildings in the district administered by Winchester City Council in Hampshire.

== Winchester ==
Name	Location	Type	Completed (Note: The date given is the date used by Historic England as significant for the initial building or that of an important part in the structure's description.)	Date designated	Grid ref. (Note: Sometimes known as OSGB36, the grid reference is based on the British national grid reference system used by the Ordnance Survey.) Geo-coordinates	Entry number (Note: The "List Entry Number" is a unique number assigned to each listed building and scheduled monument by Historic England.)	Image
The Holt	Beauworth, Winchester	Country House	1687	19 December 1983	SU5590223102; 51°00′17″N 1°12′17″W	1303462	Upload Photo
Bighton Manor House	Bighton, Winchester	House	c. 1675	5 December 1955	SU6096234485; 51°06′23″N 1°07′50″W	1350840	Upload Photo
The Old Rectory	Bighton, Winchester	House	c. 1734	5 December 1955	SU6107834453; 51°06′22″N 1°07′44″W	1095133	Upload Photo
Sutton Manor House	Bishops Sutton, Winchester	Country House	17th century	5 December 1955	SU6051632006; 51°05′03″N 1°08′15″W	1350823	Sutton Manor House More images
Bank and Offices	Bishop's Waltham, Winchester	House	Late 18th century	6 March 1967	SU5535917441; 50°57′13″N 1°12′48″W	1178766	Bank and Offices
Church of St Peter	Bishop's Waltham, Winchester	Parish Church	1136	6 March 1967	SU5555817675; 50°57′21″N 1°12′37″W	1179141	Church of St Peter More images
Palace House	Bishop's Waltham, Winchester	House	Possibly medieval	5 March 1967	SU5514217271; 50°57′08″N 1°12′59″W	1350587	Upload Photo
Waltham Mill House	Bishop's Waltham, Winchester	House	Mid 18th century	6 March 1967	SU5588416835; 50°56′54″N 1°12′21″W	1178679	Upload Photo
The Nelson Monument	Boarhunt, Winchester	Obelisk	1807	6 March 1967	SU6103707137; 50°51′38″N 1°08′03″W	1095592	The Nelson Monument More images
Bramdean House	Bramdean and Hinton Ampner, Winchester	Country House	c. 1740	5 December 1955	SU6120228075; 51°02′56″N 1°07′42″W	1155518	Bramdean House More images
Church of All Saints	Hinton Park, Bramdean and Hinton Ampner, Winchester	Parish Church	Saxon	5 December 1955	SU5971627547; 51°02′39″N 1°08′58″W	1155865	Church of All Saints More images
Church of St Simon and St Jude	Bramdean, Bramdean and Hinton Ampner, Winchester	Parish Church	c. 1170	5 December 1955	SU6098227811; 51°02′47″N 1°07′53″W	1095117	Church of St Simon and St Jude More images
Hinton Ampner Place	Bramdean and Hinton Ampner, Winchester	House	Circa 1712-17	5 December 1955	SU5977027689; 51°02′44″N 1°08′56″W	1350852	Upload Photo
Woodcote Manor	Bramdean and Hinton Ampner, Winchester	Country House	Late 15th century	5 December 1955	SU6233027899; 51°02′49″N 1°06′44″W	1155626	Upload Photo
The Old Rectory	Cheriton, Winchester	House	Late 17th century	5 December 1955	SU5819728395; 51°03′07″N 1°10′16″W	1095088	Upload Photo
Brambridge House	Colden Common, Winchester	Flats	Earlier building	5 December 1955	SU4687622300; 50°59′53″N 1°20′00″W	1350494	Brambridge House More images
Church of All Saints	Compton, Compton and Shawford, Winchester	Parish Church	12th century	5 December 1955	SU4679725646; 51°01′42″N 1°20′03″W	1157101	Church of All Saints More images
Compton End	Compton, Compton and Shawford, Winchester	House	17th century	27 November 1984	SU4625425884; 51°01′50″N 1°20′30″W	1350495	Upload Photo
Church of St Andrew	Meonstoke, Corhampton and Meonstoke, Winchester	Parish Church	13th century	6 March 1967	SU6115720215; 50°58′41″N 1°07′49″W	1179671	Church of St Andrew More images
Church of St Mary	Crawley, Crawley, Winchester	Parish Church	12th century	5 December 1955	SU4241734851; 51°06′41″N 1°23′44″W	1350455	Church of St Mary More images
The Dower House	Crawley, Winchester	Country House	early C20	13 August 1984	SU4245134813; 51°06′40″N 1°23′42″W	1155397	The Dower House More images
St Clair's Farmhouse	Droxford, Winchester	House	c. 1350	14 July 1982	SU6048515357; 50°56′04″N 1°08′26″W	1157578	Upload Photo
The Manor House	Droxford, Winchester	House	Late 16th century	6 March 1967	SU6070118269; 50°57′38″N 1°08′13″W	1301411	The Manor House More images
The Old Rectory	Droxford, Winchester	House	Older origin-Pre Late 18th century	6 March 1967	SU6070618169; 50°57′35″N 1°08′13″W	1350629	Upload Photo
Church of the Holy Cross	Durley, Winchester	Parish Church	c. 1300	6 March 1967	SU5054216980; 50°57′00″N 1°16′55″W	1350572	Church of the Holy Cross More images
Durley Mill, Mill House	Durley, Winchester	Mill House	Late 18th century	6 March 1967	SU5254415203; 50°56′02″N 1°15′13″W	1301940	Durley Mill, Mill House
Cams	Hambledon, Winchester	House	Mid 16th century	24 September 1987	SU6397214653; 50°55′40″N 1°05′28″W	1166515	Cams More images
Manor Farmhouse	Hambledon, Winchester	House	12th century	7 February 1952	SU6464715020; 50°55′52″N 1°04′53″W	1096235	Manor Farmhouse More images
Park House	Park House, Hambledon, Winchester	Farmhouse	16th century	7 February 1952	SU6555716019; 50°56′24″N 1°04′06″W	1166472	Upload Photo
Church of All Saints	Hursley, Winchester	Parish Church	14th century	5 December 1955	SU4278125284; 51°01′31″N 1°23′29″W	1095797	Church of All Saints More images
Hursley House	Hursley Park, Hursley, Winchester	Country House/ IBM Offices	1721-4	5 December 1955	SU4225625413; 51°01′36″N 1°23′56″W	1350548	Hursley House More images
Slackstead Manor	Lower Slackstead, Hursley, Winchester	House	Mid 18th century	27 November 1984	SU3944025447; 51°01′37″N 1°26′20″W	1350511	Upload Photo
Church of St Mary	Itchen Stoke, Itchen Stoke and Ovington, Winchester	Parish Church	1866	1 March 1972	SU5591232422; 51°05′18″N 1°12′11″W	1095286	Church of St Mary More images
Abbey House	Itchen Abbas, Itchen Valley, Winchester	House	1693	5 December 1955	SU5414933094; 51°05′41″N 1°13′41″W	1095873	Upload Photo
Church of St Swithun	Martyr Worthy, Itchen Valley, Winchester	Parish Church	Mid 12th century	5 December 1955	SU5156832777; 51°05′31″N 1°15′54″W	1350471	Church of St Swithun More images
Dymoke House	Easton, Itchen Valley, Winchester	House	Late 18th century	13 August 1984	SU5094432164; 51°05′12″N 1°16′27″W	1095857	Dymoke House More images
The Old Coach House and the Old Stables	Avington Park, Itchen Valley, Winchester	Stable	mid and late 18th century	5 December 1955	SU5318732210; 51°05′12″N 1°14′31″W	1350484	Upload Photo
Upper Chilland House	Chilland, Itchen Valley, Winchester	House	Early 18th century	5 December 1955	SU5241732830; 51°05′33″N 1°15′10″W	1303135	Upload Photo
Worthy Park House	Itchen Valley, Winchester	Country House	c. 1829	5 December 1955	SU5015632923; 51°05′36″N 1°17′07″W	1095892	Worthy Park House More images
Yavington Mead	Itchen Valley, Winchester	House	Late 17th century	13 August 1984	SU5508732113; 51°05′09″N 1°12′54″W	1302943	Upload Photo
Kilmeston Manor	Kilmeston, Winchester	Country House	16th century	5 December 1955	SU5909526404; 51°02′02″N 1°09′31″W	1095110	Kilmeston Manor More images
Church of St Mary	Kings Worthy, Winchester	Parish Church	Late 12th century	5 December 1955	SU4929032340; 51°05′18″N 1°17′51″W	1156360	Church of St Mary More images
Church of St Catherine	Littleton, Littleton and Harestock, Winchester	Parish Church	12th century	5 December 1955	SU4535132901; 51°05′37″N 1°21′14″W	1350469	Church of St Catherine More images
Littleton Manor	Littleton and Harestock, Winchester	Manor House	15th century	13 August 1984	SU4528632889; 51°05′37″N 1°21′17″W	1156443	Upload Photo
Church of St Mary	Micheldever, Winchester	Parish Church	Late 13th century	5 December 1955	SU5126939122; 51°08′57″N 1°16′06″W	1095267	Church of St Mary More images
Church of St John the Baptist	New Alresford, Winchester	Church Hall	C20	5 December 1955	SU5884732651; 51°05′25″N 1°09′40″W	1156507	Church of St John the Baptist More images
Langtons	New Alresford, Winchester	House	c. 1760	5 December 1955	SU5907832620; 51°05′23″N 1°09′28″W	1095229	Upload Photo
The Bridge	The Soke, New Alresford, Winchester	Bridge	14th century	5 December 1955	SU5880532925; 51°05′33″N 1°09′42″W	1350792	Upload Photo
3, 5, and 7 Mill Hill	New Alresford, Winchester	House	17th century	5 December 1955	SU5876632917; 51°05′33″N 1°09′44″W	1095230	Upload Photo
Church of St John the Evangelist	Northington, Winchester	Parish Church	1887-90	5 December 1955	SU5643837350; 51°07′58″N 1°11′41″W	1350820	Church of St John the Evangelist More images
Church of St Mary	Old Alresford, Winchester	Church	1753	16 November 1983	SU5881333654; 51°05′57″N 1°09′41″W	1095184	Church of St Mary More images
Old Alresford Place	Old Alresford, Winchester	Vicarage	c. 1740	16 November 1983	SU5884033758; 51°06′00″N 1°09′40″W	1302525	Old Alresford Place More images
Old Alresford House	Old Alresford, Winchester	Country House	1749-51	16 November 1983	SU5888533674; 51°05′58″N 1°09′38″W	1157173	Old Alresford House More images
Upton House	Old Alresford, Winchester	Country House	c. 1764	16 November 1983	SU5916233939; 51°06′06″N 1°09′23″W	1157186	Upload Photo
Church of St Matthew	Otterbourne, Winchester	Parish Church	1836-8	5 December 1955	SU4567622833; 51°00′11″N 1°21′01″W	1095758	Church of St Matthew More images
Barn 50m south east of Hensting Farmhouse	Owslebury, Winchester	Barn	17th century	5 December 1955	SU4971222437; 50°59′57″N 1°17′35″W	1095929	Upload Photo
Church of St Andrew	Owslebury, Winchester	Parish Church	14th century	5 December 1955	SU5148923394; 51°00′27″N 1°16′03″W	1095925	Church of St Andrew More images
Morestead Manor	Morestead, Owslebury, Winchester	Manor House	Late 17th century early 18th century	5 December 1955	SU5102625255; 51°01′28″N 1°16′26″W	1350872	Upload Photo
Church of St Stephen	Sparsholt, Winchester	Church	19th century	27 November 1984	SU4352431211; 51°04′43″N 1°22′48″W	1095764	Church of St Stephen More images
Dovecote 80m north-west of Lainston House	Lainston, Sparsholt, Winchester	Dovecote	18th century	5 December 1955	SU4418931680; 51°04′58″N 1°22′14″W	1350545	Dovecote 80m north-west of Lainston House
Lainston House	Lainston, Sparsholt, Winchester	Country House	Late 17th century	5 December 1955	SU4426031616; 51°04′56″N 1°22′10″W	1095761	Lainston House More images
Walled Garden and attached Animal Engine House, 75m west of Lainston House	Lainston, Sparsholt, Winchester	Garden	Late C20	5 December 1955	SU4413231653; 51°04′57″N 1°22′17″W	1178952	Upload Photo
Sevington Farmhouse	Tichborne, Winchester	Farmhouse	15th century	19 December 1983	SU5757229615; 51°03′47″N 1°10′47″W	1178670	Upload Photo
Church of St Mary	Twyford, Winchester	Parish Church	1875-8	5 December 1955	SU4813425063; 51°01′23″N 1°18′54″W	1302086	Church of St Mary More images
Mildmay House	Twyford, Winchester	House	c. 1700	5 December 1955	SU4817425094; 51°01′24″N 1°18′52″W	1302057	Upload Photo
Shawford House	Twyford, Winchester	Country House	Late 17th century	5 December 1956	SU4753124867; 51°01′16″N 1°19′25″W	1095710	Upload Photo
Twyford House, Well House & Wing House	Twyford, Winchester	House	c. 1943	5 December 1955	SU4826425068; 51°01′23″N 1°18′48″W	1095747	Twyford House, Well House & Wing House More images
Twyford Lodge	Twyford, Winchester	Villa	Late 18th century	27 November 1984	SU4808725399; 51°01′33″N 1°18′57″W	1350547	Upload Photo
Twyford Moors	Twyford, Winchester	Country House	1851-61	27 November 1984	SU4776923384; 51°00′28″N 1°19′14″W	1095770	Upload Photo
Riversdown	Warnford, Winchester	House	14th century	24 September 1987	SU6034024787; 51°01′09″N 1°08′28″W	1350307	Upload Photo
Hall Place	West Meon, Winchester	Country House	Late 17th century	7 February 1952	SU6481023885; 51°00′39″N 1°04′39″W	1350314	Upload Photo
The Court House	West Meon, Winchester	House	Late Medieval	6 March 1967	SU6392323985; 51°00′42″N 1°05′25″W	1096199	Upload Photo
Church of St Nicholas	Wickham, Winchester	Parish Church	12th century	6 March 1967	SU5753311446; 50°53′59″N 1°11′00″W	1157835	Church of St Nicholas More images
Havelock House and Wentworth House	Wickham, Winchester	House	Early 18th century	7 February 1952	SU5720911491; 50°54′00″N 1°11′16″W	1166591	Havelock House and Wentworth House
Knockers Wine Bar and M S Bell	Wickham, Winchester	House	19th century	6 March 1967	SU5716911439; 50°53′59″N 1°11′18″W	1350589	Knockers Wine Bar and M S Bell More images
Park Place	Wickham, Winchester	Country House	Mid 18th century	6 March 1967	SU5658011593; 50°54′04″N 1°11′48″W	1095586	Park Place More images
Rookesbury	Wickham, Winchester	Country House	1824	6 March 1967	SU5862111729; 50°54′07″N 1°10′04″W	1350588	Upload Photo
The Chesapeake Mill	Wickham, Winchester	Corn Mill	1820	7 February 1952	SU5741911521; 50°54′01″N 1°11′05″W	1157675	The Chesapeake Mill More images
The Old House Hotel	Wickham, Winchester	House	1707	6 March 1967	SU5728911489; 50°54′00″N 1°11′12″W	1095608	The Old House Hotel More images
Wickham House	Wickham, Winchester	House	Mid 18th century	6 March 1967	SU5729511500; 50°54′01″N 1°11′12″W	1350622	Upload Photo
Wickham Lodge	Wickham, Winchester	House	1820	6 March 1967	SU5692911487; 50°54′00″N 1°11′31″W	1095585	Upload Photo
Church of the Holy Trinity	Wonston, Winchester	Church	12th century	5 December 1955	SU4769539541; 51°09′11″N 1°19′10″W	1178539	Church of the Holy Trinity More images
Hunton House	Hunton, Wonston, Winchester	Country House	Early 18th century	5 December 1955	SU4823739819; 51°09′20″N 1°18′42″W	1350809	Hunton House More images
Norton Manor, near Sutton Scotney	Wonston, Winchester	Manor House	Late 17th century	5 December 1955	SU4699540979; 51°09′58″N 1°19′45″W	1178545	Upload Photo
The Old House	Wonston, Winchester	House	Late 14th century	5 December 1955	SU4764039508; 51°09′10″N 1°19′13″W	1350835	Upload Photo
Abbey House	Winchester	Abbey	18th century	24 March 1950	SU4846329316; 51°03′40″N 1°18′35″W	1350674	Abbey House More images
Abbots Barton Farmhouse with Cottage adjoining	Winchester	Farmhouse	17th century	24 March 1950	SU4841630727; 51°04′26″N 1°18′37″W	1095496	Upload Photo
Church of St Bartholomew	Winchester	Church	13th century	24 March 1950	SU4814030174; 51°04′08″N 1°18′52″W	1350689	Church of St Bartholomew More images
Church of St Michael	Winchester	Parish Church	15th century	22 March 1950	SU4802728924; 51°03′28″N 1°18′58″W	1350710	Church of St Michael More images
Church of the Holy Trinity	Winchester	Church	1853-5	14 January 1974	SU4835729722; 51°03′53″N 1°18′41″W	1350718	Church of the Holy Trinity More images
Colebrook House	Winchester	House	17th century	24 March 1950	SU4840329210; 51°03′37″N 1°18′39″W	1095480	Colebrook House More images
God Begot House	Winchester	House	16th century	24 March 1950	SU4805529510; 51°03′47″N 1°18′56″W	1095437	God Begot House More images
Hampshire, Isle of Wight and Winchester War Memorial	Winchester	War memorial	1921	16 May 2017	SU4811529296; 51°03′40″N 1°18′53″W	1445852	Hampshire, Isle of Wight and Winchester War Memorial More images
Hyde Abbey House	Winchester	House	17th century	24 March 1950	SU4807430034; 51°04′03″N 1°18′55″W	1172837	Hyde Abbey House More images
Hyde House	Winchester	House	Late 17th century	14 January 1974	SU4810130063; 51°04′04″N 1°18′54″W	1172898	Hyde House More images
Mediaeval and C.18th Hyde Street at Site of North Gate	Winchester	Road Bridge	c. 1250	30 August 1988	SU4805529877; 51°03′58″N 1°18′56″W	1095314	Upload Photo
Memorial of the Plague	Winchester	Commemorative Monument	1759	24 March 1950	SU4776229632; 51°03′51″N 1°19′11″W	1095345	Memorial of the Plague More images
Moberley's	69 Kingsgate Street, Winchester	House	1571	24 March 1950	SU4809128977; 51°03′29″N 1°18′55″W	1095399	Moberley's More images
Chesil Theatre (formerly St Peter's church)	Winchester	Theatre	12th century	24 March 1950	SU4866529205; 51°03′36″N 1°18′25″W	1095502	Chesil Theatre (formerly St Peter's church) More images
Serle's House	Winchester	House	c. 1740	14 January 1974	SU4786429373; 51°03′42″N 1°19′06″W	1095329	Serle's House More images
Hotel du Vin (Southgate Hotel)	Winchester	Hotel	Early 18th century	24 March 1950	SU4791529421; 51°03′44″N 1°19′03″W	1350759	Hotel du Vin (Southgate Hotel) More images
St John's Croft	Winchester	House	Mid 18th century	24 March 1950	SU4873929557; 51°03′48″N 1°18′21″W	1095387	St John's Croft More images
The Deanery Bakehouse	Winchester	Bakehouse	Early 17th century	18 February 1999	SU4822429192; 51°03′36″N 1°18′48″W	1245544	The Deanery Bakehouse More images
The Public Library	Winchester	Corn Exchange	1838	24 March 1950	SU4801929763; 51°03′55″N 1°18′58″W	1095414	The Public Library More images
30-41 High Street	Winchester	House	16th century	24 March 1950	SU4814629453; 51°03′45″N 1°18′52″W	1167832	30-41 High Street More images
49 and 50 High Street	Winchester	House	1713	24 March 1950	SU4804729485; 51°03′46″N 1°18′57″W	1167868	49 and 50 High Street More images
57 and 57a High Street	Winchester	House	18th century	24 March 1950	SU4800429499; 51°03′46″N 1°18′59″W	1350676	57 and 57a High Street More images
105 High Street	Winchester	House	Mid 18th century	24 March 1950	SU4808729497; 51°03′46″N 1°18′55″W	1095438	105 High Street More images
24 St Thomas Street	Winchester	House	Early 18th century	24 March 1950	SU4800929427; 51°03′44″N 1°18′59″W	1095365	24 St Thomas Street More images
12 Southgate Street	Winchester	House	Early 18th century	24 March 1950	SU4792429449; 51°03′45″N 1°19′03″W	1095328	12 Southgate Street More images
1 Water Lane	Winchester	Mill	1744	24 March 1950	SU4861529316; 51°03′40″N 1°18′28″W	1095347	1 Water Lane More images
26 and 27 St Swithun Street	Winchester	House	Mid 17th century	24 March 1950	SU4793329187; 51°03′36″N 1°19′03″W	1095357	26 and 27 St Swithun Street More images
23 St Peter Street	Winchester	House	18th century	24 March 1950	SU4809029547; 51°03′48″N 1°18′54″W	1095353	23 St Peter Street
5 Kingsgate Street	Winchester	House	Early 18th century	24 March 1950	SU4812629033; 51°03′31″N 1°18′53″W	1173128	5 Kingsgate Street More images
70 and 71 Kingsgate Street	Winchester	House	18th century	24 March 1950	SU4810229004; 51°03′30″N 1°18′54″W	1296339	70 and 71 Kingsgate Street More images
1 Chesil Street	Winchester	Timber Framed House	1459	24 March 1950	SU4866229272; 51°03′39″N 1°18′25″W	1350648	1 Chesil Street More images
12 Chesil Street	Winchester	House	Late 18th century	24 March 1950	SU4865529223; 51°03′37″N 1°18′26″W	1350651	12 Chesil Street More images
42 Chesil Street	Winchester	House	Remodelled 17th century	14 January 1974	SU4867929104; 51°03′33″N 1°18′24″W	1271527	42 Chesil Street More images
29 Jewry Street	Winchester	House	18th century	24 March 1950	SU4805829710; 51°03′53″N 1°18′56″W	1350688	29 Jewry Street More images
23 and 24 The Square	Winchester	House	17th century	24 March 1950	SU4809929429; 51°03′44″N 1°18′54″W	1350724	23 and 24 The Square More images
8 and 9a Kingsgate Street	Kingsgate Street, Winchester	House	18th century	24 March 1950	SU4812029005; 51°03′30″N 1°18′53″W	1350692	8 and 9a Kingsgate Street More images
8 College Street	Winchester	House	Late 18th century	14 January 1974	SU4819129035; 51°03′31″N 1°18′49″W	1350646	8 College Street More images
3 The Square	Winchester	House	Early 18th century	24 March 1950	SU4815529389; 51°03′43″N 1°18′51″W	1095331	3 The Square More images
24 and 25 St John's Street	Winchester	House	14th century to 15th century	24 March 1950	SU4871529536; 51°03′47″N 1°18′22″W	1095386	24 and 25 St John's Street More images
The King's Royal Rifle Corps War Memorial	Winchester	War memorial	1922	27 July 2017	SU4813629327; 51°03′41″N 1°18′52″W	1447365	The King's Royal Rifle Corps War Memorial More images
