= Listed buildings in Winchester =

Non-Civil Parish in Hampshire, England

Winchester is a cathedral city in the City of Winchester district of Hampshire, England. It contains 491 listed buildings that are recorded in the National Heritage List for England. Of these 41 are grade I, 40 are grade II* and 410 are grade II.

This list is based on the information retrieved online from Historic England.

== Key ==
Grade	Criteria
I	Buildings that are of exceptional interest
II*	Particularly important buildings of more than special interest
II	Buildings that are of special interest

== Listing ==
Name	Grade	Location	Type	Completed (Note: The date given is the date used by Historic England as significant for the initial building or that of an important part in the structure's description.)	Grid ref. (Note: The grid reference is based on the British national grid reference system, sometimes known as OSGB36, used by the Ordnance Survey.) Geo-coordinates	Notes	Entry number (Note: The "List Entry Number" is a unique number assigned to each listed building and scheduled monument by Historic England.)	Image	Wikidata
1-5, Abbey Passage	II	1-5, Abbey Passage			SU4841429287; 51°03′39″N 1°18′38″W		1351061	Upload Photo	Q26634203
Pyotts Cottage	II	Airlie Road			SU4729828777; 51°03′23″N 1°19′35″W		1095316	Upload Photo	Q26387649
1, Archery Lane	II	1, Archery Lane, Peninsula Barracks	building		SU4788629342; 51°03′41″N 1°19′05″W		1389282	1, Archery Lane More images	Q26668722
5-9, Archery Lane	II	5-9, Archery Lane, Peninsula Barracks	building		SU4779029342; 51°03′41″N 1°19′10″W		1389281	5-9, Archery Lane More images	Q26668721
1 and 2, Back Street (see Details for Further Address Information)	II	1 and 2, Back Street			SU4769028045; 51°02′59″N 1°19′16″W		1094703	Upload Photo	Q26387031
3, Back Street	II	3, Back Street			SU4767327945; 51°02′56″N 1°19′17″W		1094704	Upload Photo	Q26387033
4-6, Back Street	II	4-6, Back Street			SU4766827926; 51°02′55″N 1°19′17″W		1094705	Upload Photo	Q26387034
7, Back Street	II	7, Back Street			SU4766727909; 51°02′55″N 1°19′17″W		1094706	Upload Photo	Q26387035
Harley House	II	8, Back Street			SU4765127902; 51°02′55″N 1°19′18″W		1094707	Upload Photo	Q26387036
10, Back Street	II	10, Back Street			SU4765327917; 51°02′55″N 1°19′18″W		1094708	Upload Photo	Q26387037
1, Bridge Street	II	1, Bridge Street	building		SU4861229305; 51°03′40″N 1°18′28″W		1094709	1, Bridge Street More images	Q26387038
2 and 3, Bridge Street	II	2 and 3, Bridge Street			SU4862029302; 51°03′40″N 1°18′27″W		1351062	Upload Photo	Q26634204
4, Bridge Street	II	4, Bridge Street	building		SU4862729305; 51°03′40″N 1°18′27″W		1094710	4, Bridge Street More images	Q26387039
The Rising Sun Public House	II	14, Bridge Street	pub		SU4869229294; 51°03′39″N 1°18′24″W		1095315	The Rising Sun Public House More images	Q26387648
28, Canon Street	II	28, Canon Street			SU4797629125; 51°03′34″N 1°19′00″W		1094711	Upload Photo	Q26387040
46 and 47, Canon Street	II	46 and 47, Canon Street			SU4803829103; 51°03′33″N 1°18′57″W		1351063	Upload Photo	Q26634205
48-55, Canon Street	II	48-55, Canon Street			SU4806129094; 51°03′33″N 1°18′56″W		1167030	Upload Photo	Q26460490
56, Canon Street	II	56, Canon Street			SU4808429084; 51°03′33″N 1°18′55″W		1094712	Upload Photo	Q26387041
57, Canon Street	II	57, Canon Street			SU4808329069; 51°03′32″N 1°18′55″W		1351064	Upload Photo	Q26634206
58-63, Canon Street	II	58-63, Canon Street, SO23 9JW	building		SU4805629082; 51°03′33″N 1°18′56″W		1167067	58-63, Canon Street More images	Q26460525
64, Canon Street	II	64, Canon Street			SU4802929091; 51°03′33″N 1°18′58″W		1094713	Upload Photo	Q26387042
Great Hall Winchester Castle	I	Castle Avenue	great hall		SU4776729477; 51°03′46″N 1°19′11″W		1351065	Great Hall Winchester Castle More images	Q68683802
4, Castle Hill	II	4, Castle Hill			SU4780329569; 51°03′49″N 1°19′09″W		1094714	Upload Photo	Q26387043
Castle Hill Offices County Hall	II	Castle Hill	county hall		SU4778929554; 51°03′48″N 1°19′10″W		1167140	Castle Hill Offices County Hall More images	Q26460597
The King's Royal Rifle Corps War Memorial, Winchester	II*	Cathedral Close, SO23 9LS	statue		SU4813629327; 51°03′41″N 1°18′52″W		1447365	The King's Royal Rifle Corps War Memorial, Winchester More images	Q55742851
Abbots Barton Farmhouse with Cottage Adjoining	II*	Chaundler Road			SU4841630727; 51°04′26″N 1°18′37″W		1095496	Upload Photo	Q17540315
Dovecote at Abbots Barton Farm	II	Chaundler Road			SU4843230743; 51°04′26″N 1°18′36″W		1095497	Upload Photo	Q26387811
1 Chesil Street	II*	1, Chesil Street, SO23 0HU	clergy house		SU4866229272; 51°03′39″N 1°18′25″W		1350648	1 Chesil Street More images	Q17541570
3, Chesil Street	II	3, Chesil Street			SU4867229251; 51°03′38″N 1°18′25″W		1095498	Upload Photo	Q26387812
4, Chesil Street	II	4, Chesil Street	building		SU4864229260; 51°03′38″N 1°18′26″W		1095500	4, Chesil Street More images	Q26387815
6, Chesil Street	II	6, Chesil Street	building		SU4864729251; 51°03′38″N 1°18′26″W		1350650	6, Chesil Street More images	Q26633838
8 and 10, Chesil Street	II	8 and 10, Chesil Street	building		SU4864929240; 51°03′38″N 1°18′26″W		1095501	8 and 10, Chesil Street More images	Q26387817
12, Chesil Street	II*	12, Chesil Street	house		SU4865529223; 51°03′37″N 1°18′26″W		1350651	12, Chesil Street More images	Q17541584
17-21, Chesil Street	II	17-21, Chesil Street			SU4868929182; 51°03′36″N 1°18′24″W		1350649	Upload Photo	Q26633837
23-27, Chesil Street	II	23-27, Chesil Street			SU4869329166; 51°03′35″N 1°18′24″W		1095499	Upload Photo	Q26387814
40, Chesil Street	II	40, Chesil Street			SU4868229110; 51°03′33″N 1°18′24″W		1301010	Upload Photo	Q26588280
42, Chesil Street	II*	42, Chesil Street	building		SU4867929104; 51°03′33″N 1°18′24″W		1271527	42, Chesil Street More images	Q17541039
44-52, Chesil Street	II	44-52, Chesil Street			SU4867329077; 51°03′32″N 1°18′25″W		1271526	Upload Photo	Q26561469
54, Chesil Street	II	54, Chesil Street			SU4866929053; 51°03′32″N 1°18′25″W		1095503	Upload Photo	Q26387818
64, Chesil Street	II	64, Chesil Street			SU4866929025; 51°03′31″N 1°18′25″W		1296992	Upload Photo	Q26584608
Kings Arms Public House	II	88, Chesil Street	restaurant		SU4867328963; 51°03′29″N 1°18′25″W		1350653	Kings Arms Public House More images	Q26633840
Gates and Screens of No 54	II	Chesil Street			SU4867729052; 51°03′32″N 1°18′25″W		1095504	Upload Photo	Q26387819
Peter's Theatre	II*	Chesil Street	church building		SU4866529205; 51°03′36″N 1°18′25″W		1095502	Peter's Theatre More images	Q17540326
Wall on River Running Behind Nos 4 to 12	II	Chesil Street	wall		SU4861029231; 51°03′37″N 1°18′28″W		1350652	Wall on River Running Behind Nos 4 to 12 More images	Q26633839
29, Christchurch Road	II	29, Christchurch Road			SU4762628855; 51°03′25″N 1°19′19″W		1390614	Upload Photo	Q26670002
2-7, Church Path	II	2-7, Church Path			SU4817830232; 51°04′10″N 1°18′50″W		1167234	Upload Photo	Q26460689
Remains of City Wall Within the Curtilage of No 26 Jewry Street	II	City Wall			SU4801529854; 51°03′58″N 1°18′58″W		1095506	Upload Photo	Q26387820
Remains of North West Corner of City Wall	II	City Wall			SU4791029867; 51°03′58″N 1°19′04″W		1350654	Upload Photo	Q26633841
16, Clifton Hill (see Details for Further Address Information)	II	16, Clifton Hill			SU4750229583; 51°03′49″N 1°19′25″W		1391458	Upload Photo	Q26670821
Clifton Lodge	II	1, Clifton Road, City Wall			SU4758329556; 51°03′48″N 1°19′20″W		1296967	Upload Photo	Q26584587
8 and 9, Clifton Road	II	8 and 9, Clifton Road			SU4748829634; 51°03′51″N 1°19′25″W		1095507	Upload Photo	Q26387821
10, Clifton Road	II	10, Clifton Road			SU4748729646; 51°03′51″N 1°19′25″W		1350655	Upload Photo	Q26633842
11 and 12, Clifton Road	II	11 and 12, Clifton Road			SU4748629659; 51°03′52″N 1°19′25″W		1296974	Upload Photo	Q26584593
1-11, Clifton Terrace	II	1-11, Clifton Terrace			SU4761329594; 51°03′49″N 1°19′19″W		1095508	Upload Photo	Q26387822
Clifton House	II	Clifton Terrace			SU4762329643; 51°03′51″N 1°19′18″W		1255549	Upload Photo	Q26547130
Littlehales Memorial Drinking Fountain	II	Clifton Terrace			SU4765129709; 51°03′53″N 1°19′17″W		1296979	Upload Photo	Q26584596
12, Colebrook Street	II	12, Colebrook Street			SU4859229195; 51°03′36″N 1°18′29″W		1095477	Upload Photo	Q26387795
13-15, Colebrook Street	II	13-15, Colebrook Street			SU4857429187; 51°03′36″N 1°18′30″W		1095478	Upload Photo	Q26387796
Winchester Quaker Meeting House	II	16, Colebrook Street, SO23 9LH	Quaker meeting house		SU4849029182; 51°03′36″N 1°18′34″W		1350680	Winchester Quaker Meeting House More images	Q26633859
26, Colebrook Street	II	26, Colebrook Street	building		SU4843329202; 51°03′36″N 1°18′37″W		1350681	26, Colebrook Street More images	Q26633860
Colebrook House	II*	27 and 28, Colebrook Street	house		SU4840329210; 51°03′37″N 1°18′39″W		1095480	Colebrook House More images	Q17540297
34, Colebrook Street	II	34, Colebrook Street	building		SU4835329234; 51°03′37″N 1°18′41″W		1095481	34, Colebrook Street More images	Q26387798
Abbey Mill House	II	97, Colebrook Street			SU4841129233; 51°03′37″N 1°18′38″W		1095482	Upload Photo	Q26387799
108, Colebrook Street	II	108, Colebrook Street			SU4856929239; 51°03′38″N 1°18′30″W		1167470	Upload Photo	Q26460922
Garden Wall of No 16	II	Colebrook Street			SU4850729189; 51°03′36″N 1°18′33″W		1095479	Upload Photo	Q26387797
Wall of Nos 27 and 28	II	Colebrook Street			SU4838629225; 51°03′37″N 1°18′39″W		1350682	Upload Photo	Q26633861
7, College Street	II	7, College Street	building		SU4822729043; 51°03′31″N 1°18′48″W		1350683	7, College Street More images	Q26633862
8, College Street	II*	8, College Street	house		SU4819129035; 51°03′31″N 1°18′49″W		1350646	8, College Street More images	Q17541559
9, College Street	II	9, College Street	building		SU4818029035; 51°03′31″N 1°18′50″W		1167677	9, College Street More images	Q26461115
10, College Street	II	10, College Street	building		SU4817429043; 51°03′31″N 1°18′50″W		1095495	10, College Street More images	Q26387809
11, College Street	II	11, College Street	building		SU4816629046; 51°03′31″N 1°18′51″W		1350647	11, College Street More images	Q26633836
12, College Street	II	12, College Street	building		SU4815829049; 51°03′32″N 1°18′51″W		1296780	12, College Street More images	Q26584411
13-16, College Street	II	13-16, College Street	building		SU4814529058; 51°03′32″N 1°18′52″W		1350667	13-16, College Street More images	Q26633852
Boundary Wall on College Street and College Walk St Mary's College	II	College Street	wall		SU4837328965; 51°03′29″N 1°18′40″W		1095494	Boundary Wall on College Street and College Walk St Mary's College More images	Q26387808
Chamber Court with Middle Gate St Mary's College	I	College Street	architectural structure		SU4823928980; 51°03′29″N 1°18′47″W		1296879	Chamber Court with Middle Gate St Mary's College More images	Q17528733
Cloisters St Mary's College	I	College Street	architectural structure		SU4823528913; 51°03′27″N 1°18′47″W		1296887	Cloisters St Mary's College More images	Q17528740
College Hall St Mary's College	I	College Street			SU4822828950; 51°03′28″N 1°18′48″W		1095484	Upload Photo	Q99617673
College Mill St Mary's College	II	College Street			SU4826928862; 51°03′25″N 1°18′46″W		1296819	Upload Photo	Q26584448
Fromond's Chantry St Marys College	I	College Street	architectural structure		SU4825128910; 51°03′27″N 1°18′46″W		1095485	Fromond's Chantry St Marys College More images	Q17528614
Gate Between Headmaster's House and No 8 College Street St Mary's College	II	College Street			SU4819729035; 51°03′31″N 1°18′49″W		1296770	Upload Photo	Q26584402
Gateway to East of Headmaster's House St Mary's College	II	College Street			SU4822829022; 51°03′31″N 1°18′48″W		1095489	Upload Photo	Q26387803
Headmaster's House St Mary's College	II	College Street	architectural structure		SU4820929025; 51°03′31″N 1°18′49″W		1296847	Headmaster's House St Mary's College More images	Q26584476
Memorial Buildings St Mary's College	II	College Street			SU4812328870; 51°03′26″N 1°18′53″W		1167595	Upload Photo	Q26461038
Moberly Court and Flint Court St Mary's College	II	College Street	building		SU4818328972; 51°03′29″N 1°18′50″W		1095490	Moberly Court and Flint Court St Mary's College More images	Q26387804
New Hall St Mary's College	II	College Street	architectural structure		SU4831628875; 51°03′26″N 1°18′43″W		1296802	New Hall St Mary's College More images	Q26584432
Non-licet Gate with Wall Adjoining St Mary's College	II	College Street			SU4826828872; 51°03′26″N 1°18′46″W		1095492	Upload Photo	Q26387806
Old Wall Surrounding College Mead Incorporating Ridding Memorial Gateway St Mary's College	II	College Street			SU4818628759; 51°03′22″N 1°18′50″W		1095488	Upload Photo	Q26387802
Outer Court with Outer Gate St Mary's College	I	College Street	architectural structure		SU4825029013; 51°03′30″N 1°18′46″W		1095483	Outer Court with Outer Gate St Mary's College More images	Q17528610
School, Winchester College	I	College Street			SU4821828918; 51°03′27″N 1°18′48″W		1167544	Upload Photo	Q17528700
Sick House St Mary's College	I	College Street	architectural structure		SU4811328837; 51°03′25″N 1°18′54″W		1350685	Sick House St Mary's College More images	Q17528807
South Africa Gateway and Adjoining Buildings Facing Kingsgate Street St Mary's College	II	College Street	architectural structure		SU4808528894; 51°03′27″N 1°18′55″W		1296843	South Africa Gateway and Adjoining Buildings Facing Kingsgate Street St Mary's College More images	Q26584472
St Mary's College Chapel	I	College Street	chapel		SU4825928940; 51°03′28″N 1°18′46″W		1350684	St Mary's College Chapel More images	Q17528804
St Mary's College Stewart Memorial Gateway	II	College Street			SU4826628882; 51°03′26″N 1°18′46″W		1095491	Upload Photo	Q26387805
St Mary's College Wall Behind Nos 9 to 15 Kingsgate Street	II	College Street			SU4815428942; 51°03′28″N 1°18′51″W		1095493	Upload Photo	Q26387807
St Mary's College Wall to South of South Africa Gateway	II	College Street	building		SU4806328837; 51°03′25″N 1°18′56″W		1095487	St Mary's College Wall to South of South Africa Gateway More images	Q26387801
St Mary's College Warden's Lodgings	I	College Street	architectural structure		SU4828028967; 51°03′29″N 1°18′45″W		1167489	St Mary's College Warden's Lodgings More images	Q17528693
The War Cloister, Winchester College	I	College Street, SO23 9NA	war memorial		SU4811928905; 51°03′27″N 1°18′53″W		1095486	The War Cloister, Winchester College More images	Q26387800
Blackbridge House	II	College Walk			SU4847428809; 51°03′24″N 1°18′35″W		1350668	Upload Photo	Q26633853
Pavement Adjoining the College Wall	II	College Walk	building		SU4837328893; 51°03′26″N 1°18′40″W		1095454	Pavement Adjoining the College Wall More images	Q26387773
Castle Avenue Offices, County Hall	II	County Hall, Castle Avenue	architectural structure		SU4775829542; 51°03′48″N 1°19′11″W		1167078	Castle Avenue Offices, County Hall More images	Q26460537
1-5 De Lunn Buildings	II	1-5, De Lunn Buildings, Jewry Street	building		SU4804229818; 51°03′56″N 1°18′57″W		1422732	1-5 De Lunn Buildings More images	Q26676974
Dean Prior	II	Dean Lane			SU4645730616; 51°04′23″N 1°20′18″W		1095455	Upload Photo	Q26387774
1-3, Eastgate Street	II	1-3, Eastgate Street	building		SU4852829351; 51°03′41″N 1°18′32″W		1350669	1-3, Eastgate Street More images	Q26633854
4-8, Eastgate Street	II	4-8, Eastgate Street	building		SU4855329365; 51°03′42″N 1°18′31″W		1095456	4-8, Eastgate Street More images	Q26387775
9-19, Eastgate Street	II	9-19, Eastgate Street			SU4856029409; 51°03′43″N 1°18′30″W		1095457	Upload Photo	Q26387776
20-27, Eastgate Street	II	20-27, Eastgate Street			SU4856129463; 51°03′45″N 1°18′30″W		1088091	Upload Photo	Q26380475
Former Mildmay Arms	II	74, Eastgate Street, SO23 8DZ			SU4857629344; 51°03′41″N 1°18′30″W		1380147	Upload Photo	Q26660362
Eastgate House	II	Eastgate Street	house		SU4856829323; 51°03′40″N 1°18′30″W		1380148	Eastgate House More images	Q26660363
Garden Boundary Wall to South of Du Boulays	II	Edgar Road			SU4775129041; 51°03′31″N 1°19′12″W		1389674	Upload Photo	Q26669107
1-6, Gar Street	II	1-6, Gar Street, Peninsula Barracks			SU4783529373; 51°03′42″N 1°19′08″W		1389283	Upload Photo	Q26668723
Former Peninsula Barracks: Royal Hussars Museum (former Militia Stores)	II	7-9, Gar Street, SO23 9JW			SU4784729411; 51°03′43″N 1°19′07″W		1258526	Upload Photo	Q26549750
Peninsula Barracks Main Entrance Gate Piers, Gates and Flanking Railings and Piers	II	Gates And Flanking Railings And Piers, Romsey Road	gate		SU4768629555; 51°03′48″N 1°19′15″W		1258465	Peninsula Barracks Main Entrance Gate Piers, Gates and Flanking Railings and Piers More images	Q26549697
2-8, Grafton Road	II	2-8, Grafton Road			SU4764928847; 51°03′25″N 1°19′17″W		1389321	Upload Photo	Q26668760
1 and 2, Great Minster Street	II	1 and 2, Great Minster Street	building		SU4807729374; 51°03′42″N 1°18′55″W		1095458	1 and 2, Great Minster Street More images	Q26387777
Minster House	I	3, Great Minster Street	house		SU4805829350; 51°03′41″N 1°18′56″W		1350671	Minster House More images	Q17528785
4, Great Minster Street	II	4, Great Minster Street	building		SU4805929373; 51°03′42″N 1°18′56″W		1296735	4, Great Minster Street More images	Q26584371
5, Great Minster Street	II	5, Great Minster Street	building		SU4806129378; 51°03′42″N 1°18′56″W		1350672	5, Great Minster Street More images	Q26633856
6, Great Minster Street	II	6, Great Minster Street	building		SU4806329384; 51°03′42″N 1°18′56″W		1095460	6, Great Minster Street More images	Q26387779
7, Great Minster Street	II	7, Great Minster Street	building		SU4806429390; 51°03′43″N 1°18′56″W		1167766	7, Great Minster Street More images	Q26461194
9, Great Minster Street	II	9, Great Minster Street	building		SU4807029412; 51°03′43″N 1°18′56″W		1350673	9, Great Minster Street More images	Q26633857
Garden Wall to the South of Minster House on the East and South Sides of the Garden	I	Great Minster Street			SU4805929320; 51°03′40″N 1°18′56″W		1095459	Upload Photo	Q17528602
No 8 and the Old Vine Inn	II	Great Minster Street	building		SU4806729400; 51°03′43″N 1°18′56″W		1095461	No 8 and the Old Vine Inn More images	Q26387780
The Hampshire, Isle of Wight and Winchester War Memorial	II*	Great Minster Street, SO23 9LS	war memorial		SU4811529296; 51°03′40″N 1°18′53″W		1445852	The Hampshire, Isle of Wight and Winchester War Memorial More images	Q55721698
25, High Street	II	25, High Street			SU4820329432; 51°03′44″N 1°18′49″W		1095466	Upload Photo	Q26387785
26 and 27, High Street	II	26 and 27, High Street	building		SU4819729437; 51°03′44″N 1°18′49″W		1167825	26 and 27, High Street More images	Q26461253
28, High Street	II	28, High Street	building		SU4818729440; 51°03′44″N 1°18′50″W		1095467	28, High Street More images	Q26387786
29, High Street	II	29, High Street	building		SU4817729443; 51°03′44″N 1°18′50″W		1095468	29, High Street More images	Q26387787
30-41, High Street	II*	30-41, High Street	building		SU4814629453; 51°03′45″N 1°18′52″W		1167832	30-41, High Street More images	Q17540822
42, High Street	II	42, High Street			SU4809829470; 51°03′45″N 1°18′54″W		1095470	Upload Photo	Q26387789
43, High Street	II	43, High Street	building		SU4809129472; 51°03′45″N 1°18′54″W		1296702	43, High Street More images	Q26584338
44, High Street	II	44, High Street	building		SU4808529475; 51°03′45″N 1°18′55″W		1095471	44, High Street More images	Q26387790
45, High Street	II	45, High Street	building		SU4807329473; 51°03′45″N 1°18′55″W		1167864	45, High Street More images	Q26461289
46 and 47, High Street	II	46 and 47, High Street	building		SU4806329477; 51°03′45″N 1°18′56″W		1350675	46 and 47, High Street More images	Q26633858
48, High Street	II	48, High Street	building		SU4805529482; 51°03′46″N 1°18′56″W		1095472	48, High Street More images	Q26387791
49 and 50, High Street	II*	49 and 50, High Street	building		SU4804729485; 51°03′46″N 1°18′57″W		1167868	49 and 50, High Street More images	Q17540832
57 and 57a, High Street	II*	57 and 57a, High Street	building		SU4800429499; 51°03′46″N 1°18′59″W		1350676	57 and 57a, High Street More images	Q17541608
58 and 59, High Street	II	58 and 59, High Street			SU4799429502; 51°03′46″N 1°18′59″W		1095473	Upload Photo	Q26387792
60-62, High Street	II	60-62, High Street			SU4798229507; 51°03′46″N 1°19′00″W		1168076	Upload Photo	Q26461487
63, High Street	II	63, High Street			SU4797429509; 51°03′47″N 1°19′00″W		1095474	Upload Photo	Q26387793
64, High Street	II	64, High Street			SU4797029511; 51°03′47″N 1°19′01″W		1296576	Upload Photo	Q26584216
70, High Street	II	70, High Street			SU4791829531; 51°03′47″N 1°19′03″W		1350694	Upload Photo	Q26633868
71, High Street	II	71, High Street			SU4791229533; 51°03′47″N 1°19′04″W		1095433	Upload Photo	Q26387754
73, High Street	II	73, High Street			SU4789229538; 51°03′47″N 1°19′05″W		1095434	Upload Photo	Q26387755
81, High Street	II	81, High Street			SU4787029571; 51°03′49″N 1°19′06″W		1095435	Upload Photo	Q26387756
85, High Street	II	85, High Street			SU4793029551; 51°03′48″N 1°19′03″W		1095436	Upload Photo	Q26387757
86 and 87, High Street	II	86 and 87, High Street			SU4793929546; 51°03′48″N 1°19′02″W		1350697	Upload Photo	Q26633870
God Begot House	II*	101 and 102, High Street	house		SU4805529510; 51°03′47″N 1°18′56″W		1095437	God Begot House More images	Q17540267
105, High Street	II*	105, High Street	building		SU4808729497; 51°03′46″N 1°18′55″W		1095438	105, High Street More images	Q17540279
107 and 107a, High Street	II	107 and 107a, High Street			SU4811229496; 51°03′46″N 1°18′53″W		1350698	Upload Photo	Q26633871
108 and 109, High Street	II	108 and 109, High Street			SU4812229490; 51°03′46″N 1°18′53″W		1350699	Upload Photo	Q26633872
W H Smith	II	110, High Street			SU4813229503; 51°03′46″N 1°18′52″W		1359556	Upload Photo	Q26641782
125, High Street	II	125, High Street			SU4820929455; 51°03′45″N 1°18′48″W		1095439	Upload Photo	Q26387758
130-133, High Street	II	130-133, High Street			SU4825129438; 51°03′44″N 1°18′46″W		1350700	Upload Photo	Q26633873
154, 154a and 155, High Street	II	154, 154a and 155, High Street	building		SU4838229396; 51°03′43″N 1°18′40″W		1172787	154, 154a and 155, High Street More images	Q26467556
156, High Street	II	156, High Street	building		SU4839229393; 51°03′43″N 1°18′39″W		1095440	156, High Street More images	Q26387759
The India Arms Public House	II	157, High Street	pub		SU4840229388; 51°03′42″N 1°18′38″W		1172798	The India Arms Public House More images	Q26467568
158 and 159, High Street	II	158 and 159, High Street	building		SU4841329385; 51°03′42″N 1°18′38″W		1350701	158 and 159, High Street More images	Q26633874
64a, High Street	II	64a, High Street			SU4796429513; 51°03′47″N 1°19′01″W		1095432	Upload Photo	Q26387753
Abbey House	II*	High Street	house		SU4846329316; 51°03′40″N 1°18′35″W		1350674	Abbey House More images	Q17541597
Butter Cross	II	High Street	buttercross		SU4810029478; 51°03′45″N 1°18′54″W		1095469	Butter Cross More images	Q17646373
City Bridge	I	High Street	bridge		SU4860229298; 51°03′39″N 1°18′28″W		1167781	City Bridge More images	Q17528704
Fence of Abbey House	II	High Street			SU4846029336; 51°03′41″N 1°18′36″W		1296715	Upload Photo	Q26584351
Garden Temple to Abbey House	II	High Street	building		SU4844429237; 51°03′38″N 1°18′36″W		1095463	Garden Temple to Abbey House More images	Q26387782
Gateway of St John's Hospital (north)	II	High Street			SU4851329347; 51°03′41″N 1°18′33″W		1350702	Upload Photo	Q26633875
Horse and Rider Sculpture	II	High Street	statue		SU4787729548; 51°03′48″N 1°19′05″W		1445381	Horse and Rider Sculpture More images	Q55753820
St John's Hospital (north)	II	High Street	almshouse		SU4851329411; 51°03′43″N 1°18′33″W		1172822	St John's Hospital (north) More images	Q26467589
St John's Hospital (south)	II	High Street	building		SU4856529293; 51°03′39″N 1°18′30″W		1095462	St John's Hospital (south) More images	Q26387781
St John's Rooms and Chapel	I	High Street	hospital		SU4849229361; 51°03′42″N 1°18′34″W		1095441	St John's Rooms and Chapel More images	Q17528597
Statue of Alfred the Great	II	High Street	statue		SU4851729331; 51°03′41″N 1°18′33″W		1167789	Statue of Alfred the Great More images	Q26461216
The Guildhall	II	High Street	convention center		SU4841729339; 51°03′41″N 1°18′38″W		1095464	The Guildhall More images	Q26387783
The Old Market House	II	High Street			SU4821429420; 51°03′44″N 1°18′48″W		1167813	Upload Photo	Q26461241
The Westgate	I	High Street	fortified gateway		SU4781229576; 51°03′49″N 1°19′09″W		1350695	The Westgate More images	Q7988816
Tower of Former Church of St Maurice	II	High Street	church building		SU4826529400; 51°03′43″N 1°18′46″W		1095465	Tower of Former Church of St Maurice More images	Q26387784
Walcote Chambers	II	High Street			SU4789729580; 51°03′49″N 1°19′04″W		1350696	Upload Photo	Q26633869
Arch in Wall of No 25	II	Hyde Close			SU4800430051; 51°04′04″N 1°18′59″W		1095443	Upload Photo	Q26387761
Garden Wall of Nos 20 to 25	II	Hyde Close			SU4802630056; 51°04′04″N 1°18′57″W		1095442	Upload Photo	Q26387760
Premises Occupied by Richardson and Starling Ltd	II	Hyde Close			SU4802830074; 51°04′05″N 1°18′57″W		1172828	Upload Photo	Q26467595
Hyde Abbey House	II*	23, Hyde Street	house		SU4807430034; 51°04′03″N 1°18′55″W		1172837	Hyde Abbey House More images	Q17540854
25 and 26, Hyde Street	II	25 and 26, Hyde Street			SU4807930050; 51°04′04″N 1°18′55″W		1095445	Upload Photo	Q26387763
27-30, 30a and 30b Hyde Street	II	27-30, 30a and 30b, Hyde Street			SU4808030076; 51°04′05″N 1°18′55″W		1422729	Upload Photo	Q26676973
32, Hyde Street	II	32, Hyde Street			SU4808330139; 51°04′07″N 1°18′55″W		1296499	Upload Photo	Q26584147
33, Hyde Street	II	33, Hyde Street			SU4808330154; 51°04′07″N 1°18′55″W		1095446	Upload Photo	Q26387764
34, Hyde Street	II	34, Hyde Street			SU4808430168; 51°04′08″N 1°18′54″W		1172850	Upload Photo	Q26467616
35-42, Hyde Street	II	35-42, Hyde Street			SU4808030191; 51°04′09″N 1°18′55″W		1095447	Upload Photo	Q26387765
43, Hyde Street	II	43, Hyde Street			SU4805730238; 51°04′10″N 1°18′56″W		1095448	Upload Photo	Q26387766
44, Hyde Street	II	44, Hyde Street			SU4806430293; 51°04′12″N 1°18′55″W		1172858	Upload Photo	Q26467623
52, Hyde Street	II	52, Hyde Street			SU4809430344; 51°04′14″N 1°18′54″W		1095449	Upload Photo	Q26387767
Kingston House	II	53 and 53a, Hyde Street			SU4810630295; 51°04′12″N 1°18′53″W		1095450	Upload Photo	Q26387768
The Vicarage	II	54, Hyde Street			SU4810830253; 51°04′11″N 1°18′53″W		1172862	Upload Photo	Q26467627
55, Hyde Street	II	55, Hyde Street			SU4810830227; 51°04′10″N 1°18′53″W		1350703	Upload Photo	Q26633876
56, Hyde Street	II	56, Hyde Street			SU4809930216; 51°04′09″N 1°18′54″W		1172870	Upload Photo	Q26467635
57, Hyde Street	II	57, Hyde Street	building		SU4810030207; 51°04′09″N 1°18′54″W		1095451	57, Hyde Street More images	Q26387769
58, Hyde Street	II	58, Hyde Street			SU4810030196; 51°04′09″N 1°18′54″W		1095452	Upload Photo	Q26387770
59, Hyde Street	II	59, Hyde Street			SU4809930183; 51°04′08″N 1°18′54″W		1296476	Upload Photo	Q26584127
60, Hyde Street	II	60, Hyde Street			SU4809930168; 51°04′08″N 1°18′54″W		1350666	Upload Photo	Q26633851
Hyde House	II*	75, Hyde Street	house		SU4810130063; 51°04′04″N 1°18′54″W		1172898	Hyde House More images	Q17540871
Barns at No 75	II	Hyde Street			SU4812430056; 51°04′04″N 1°18′52″W		1095453	Upload Photo	Q26387772
Garden Wall of No 23	II	Hyde Street			SU4806230046; 51°04′04″N 1°18′56″W		1095444	Upload Photo	Q26387762
Medieval and C18 Bridge Under Hyde Street at Site of North Gate	II*	Hyde Street			SU4805529877; 51°03′58″N 1°18′56″W		1095314	Upload Photo	Q17540109
Northgate House the White Swan Public House	II	Hyde Street	pub		SU4806629893; 51°03′59″N 1°18′55″W		1095312	Northgate House the White Swan Public House More images	Q26387646
Walls of No 75	II	Hyde Street			SU4814030075; 51°04′05″N 1°18′52″W		1350721	Upload Photo	Q26633892
The Deanery, Incorporating Prior's Hall	I	Incorporating Prior's Hall, The Close	architectural structure		SU4819729175; 51°03′36″N 1°18′49″W		1095514	The Deanery, Incorporating Prior's Hall More images	Q17528631
Debtors' Dining Hall	II	12, Jewry Street			SU4800929639; 51°03′51″N 1°18′59″W		1095413	Upload Photo	Q26387736
16, Jewry Street	II	16, Jewry Street			SU4802429675; 51°03′52″N 1°18′58″W		1387462	Upload Photo	Q26667114
17 and 18, Jewry Street	II	17 and 18, Jewry Street	building		SU4803329688; 51°03′52″N 1°18′57″W		1387463	17 and 18, Jewry Street More images	Q26667115
22-26, Jewry Street	II	22-26, Jewry Street			SU4802329842; 51°03′57″N 1°18′58″W		1095415	Upload Photo	Q26387737
29, Jewry Street	II*	29, Jewry Street			SU4805829710; 51°03′53″N 1°18′56″W		1350688	Upload Photo	Q17541621
Century House	II	30-31, Jewry Street	house		SU4805829684; 51°03′52″N 1°18′56″W		1359557	Century House More images	Q26641783
34-37, Jewry Street	II	34-37, Jewry Street			SU4804329653; 51°03′51″N 1°18′57″W		1095418	Upload Photo	Q26387740
38 and 39, Jewry Street	II	38 and 39, Jewry Street			SU4803829640; 51°03′51″N 1°18′57″W		1173030	Upload Photo	Q26467809
28a, Jewry Street	II	28a, Jewry Street, SO23 8RY			SU4807629776; 51°03′55″N 1°18′55″W		1350687	Upload Photo	Q26633864
29a, Jewry Street	II	29a, Jewry Street			SU4805329696; 51°03′53″N 1°18′56″W		1173019	Upload Photo	Q26467796
Congregational Church	II	Jewry Street	church building		SU4800129628; 51°03′50″N 1°18′59″W		1387465	Congregational Church More images	Q26667117
Roman Catholic Church of St Peter	II	Jewry Street, SO23 8RY	church building		SU4810229731; 51°03′54″N 1°18′54″W		1095417	Roman Catholic Church of St Peter More images	Q26387739
The Old Gaol	II	11a, Jewry Street			SU4800029611; 51°03′50″N 1°18′59″W		1387464	Upload Photo	Q26667116
Theatre Royal	II	Jewry Street	theatre building		SU4801329818; 51°03′57″N 1°18′58″W		1350686	Theatre Royal More images	Q26633863
Cart Shed to West of Hyde Abbey Gateway and Adjoining It	I	King Alfred Place			SU4814630142; 51°04′07″N 1°18′51″W		1296399	Upload Photo	Q99646047
Church of St Bartholomew	II*	King Alfred Place	church building		SU4814030174; 51°04′08″N 1°18′52″W		1350689	Church of St Bartholomew More images	Q17541635
Hyde Abbey Gateway	I	King Alfred Place	gate		SU4816030131; 51°04′07″N 1°18′51″W		1095419	Hyde Abbey Gateway More images	Q17528593
Wall (to East and North of Courtyard Walls of No 75 Hyde Street)	II	King Alfred Place			SU4818130095; 51°04′05″N 1°18′49″W		1350690	Upload Photo	Q26633865
Walls and Bridges (remains of Hyde Abbey)	II	King Alfred Place			SU4819230109; 51°04′06″N 1°18′49″W		1095420	Upload Photo	Q26387741
22, Kingsgate Road	II	22, Kingsgate Road			SU4803428780; 51°03′23″N 1°18′58″W		1296403	Upload Photo	Q26584064
23, Kingsgate Road	II	23, Kingsgate Road			SU4801828754; 51°03′22″N 1°18′59″W		1095421	Upload Photo	Q26387742
24-26, Kingsgate Road	II	24-26, Kingsgate Road			SU4800828737; 51°03′22″N 1°18′59″W		1296412	Upload Photo	Q26584073
27, Kingsgate Road	II	27, Kingsgate Road			SU4798628685; 51°03′20″N 1°19′00″W		1350691	Upload Photo	Q26633866
30 and 31, Kingsgate Road	II	30 and 31, Kingsgate Road			SU4792028599; 51°03′17″N 1°19′04″W		1095423	Upload Photo	Q26387744
32 and 33, Kingsgate Road	II	32 and 33, Kingsgate Road			SU4792528609; 51°03′17″N 1°19′03″W		1296384	Upload Photo	Q26584046
43, Kingsgate Road	II	43, Kingsgate Road			SU4796128672; 51°03′19″N 1°19′01″W		1095424	Upload Photo	Q26387745
44-48, Kingsgate Road	II	44-48, Kingsgate Road			SU4798428718; 51°03′21″N 1°19′00″W		1095425	Upload Photo	Q26387746
Kingsgate House	II	Kingsgate Road			SU4801828797; 51°03′23″N 1°18′58″W		1095427	Upload Photo	Q26387748
Outbuilding to the North of No 48	II	Kingsgate Road			SU4799628746; 51°03′22″N 1°19′00″W		1173096	Upload Photo	Q26467873
Priors' Barton	II	Kingsgate Road			SU4782728335; 51°03′09″N 1°19′09″W		1095422	Upload Photo	Q26387743
Wall of No 48	II	Kingsgate Road			SU4799428730; 51°03′21″N 1°19′00″W		1095426	Upload Photo	Q26387747
Wall of Priors Barton	II	Kingsgate Road			SU4783028363; 51°03′09″N 1°19′08″W		1173076	Upload Photo	Q26467854
1 and 2, Kingsgate Street	II	1 and 2, Kingsgate Street			SU4813329057; 51°03′32″N 1°18′52″W		1296389	Upload Photo	Q26584051
4, Kingsgate Street	II	4, Kingsgate Street			SU4812829042; 51°03′31″N 1°18′53″W		1095428	Upload Photo	Q26387749
5, Kingsgate Street	II*	5, Kingsgate Street	building		SU4812629033; 51°03′31″N 1°18′53″W		1173128	5, Kingsgate Street More images	Q17540884
6 and 7, Kingsgate Street	II	6 and 7, Kingsgate Street			SU4812429022; 51°03′31″N 1°18′53″W		1095429	6 and 7, Kingsgate Street	Q26387750
8 and 9a, Kingsgate Street	II*	8 and 9a, Kingsgate Street	building		SU4812029005; 51°03′30″N 1°18′53″W		1350692	8 and 9a, Kingsgate Street More images	Q17541649
9, Kingsgate Street	II	9, Kingsgate Street	building		SU4811428988; 51°03′30″N 1°18′53″W		1296370	9, Kingsgate Street More images	Q26584032
10, Kingsgate Street	II	10, Kingsgate Street			SU4811028981; 51°03′29″N 1°18′54″W		1095430	Upload Photo	Q26387751
11, Kingsgate Street	II	11, Kingsgate Street			SU4811028975; 51°03′29″N 1°18′54″W		1350693	Upload Photo	Q26633867
12, Kingsgate Street	II	12, Kingsgate Street			SU4810928966; 51°03′29″N 1°18′54″W		1173144	Upload Photo	Q26467920
13 and 14, Kingsgate Street	II	13 and 14, Kingsgate Street	building		SU4810028946; 51°03′28″N 1°18′54″W		1095431	13 and 14, Kingsgate Street More images	Q26387752
15, Kingsgate Street	II	15, Kingsgate Street	building		SU4809328922; 51°03′27″N 1°18′55″W		1173155	15, Kingsgate Street More images	Q26467931
16, Kingsgate Street	II	16, Kingsgate Street	building		SU4808928909; 51°03′27″N 1°18′55″W		1350712	16, Kingsgate Street More images	Q26633884
52, Kingsgate Street	II	52, Kingsgate Street			SU4804128821; 51°03′24″N 1°18′57″W		1095393	Upload Photo	Q26387715
53 and 54, Kingsgate Street	II	53 and 54, Kingsgate Street			SU4804528830; 51°03′25″N 1°18′57″W		1350713	Upload Photo	Q26633885
55-58, Kingsgate Street	II	55-58, Kingsgate Street	building		SU4804928843; 51°03′25″N 1°18′57″W		1095394	55-58, Kingsgate Street More images	Q26387716
59, Kingsgate Street	II	59, Kingsgate Street	building		SU4805828859; 51°03′25″N 1°18′56″W		1095395	59, Kingsgate Street More images	Q26387717
60, Kingsgate Street	II	60, Kingsgate Street	building		SU4806128867; 51°03′26″N 1°18′56″W		1350714	60, Kingsgate Street More images	Q26633886
61, Kingsgate Street	II	61, Kingsgate Street	building		SU4806328875; 51°03′26″N 1°18′56″W		1095396	61, Kingsgate Street More images	Q26387719
62 Kingsgate Street	II	62, Kingsgate Street	building		SU4806628899; 51°03′27″N 1°18′56″W		1095397	62 Kingsgate Street More images	Q26387720
65, Kingsgate Street	II	65, Kingsgate Street	building		SU4807728935; 51°03′28″N 1°18′55″W		1095398	65, Kingsgate Street More images	Q26387721
66-68, Kingsgate Street	II	66-68, Kingsgate Street	building		SU4808428950; 51°03′28″N 1°18′55″W		1350716	66-68, Kingsgate Street More images	Q26633888
Moberley's	II*	69, Kingsgate Street	building		SU4809128977; 51°03′29″N 1°18′55″W		1095399	Moberley's More images	Q17540244
70 and 71, Kingsgate Street	II*	70 and 71, Kingsgate Street	building		SU4810229004; 51°03′30″N 1°18′54″W		1296339	70 and 71, Kingsgate Street More images	Q17541067
72 and 73, Kingsgate Street	II	72 and 73, Kingsgate Street	building		SU4810629021; 51°03′31″N 1°18′54″W		1350717	72 and 73, Kingsgate Street More images	Q26633889
74, Kingsgate Street	II	74, Kingsgate Street	building		SU4810729036; 51°03′31″N 1°18′54″W		1296305	74, Kingsgate Street More images	Q26583969
75 and 76, Kingsgate Street	II	75 and 76, Kingsgate Street	hotel		SU4811229046; 51°03′31″N 1°18′54″W		1095400	75 and 76, Kingsgate Street More images	Q26387722
61a, Kingsgate Street	II	61a, Kingsgate Street	building		SU4806328888; 51°03′26″N 1°18′56″W		1350715	61a, Kingsgate Street More images	Q26633887
Stable Block of No 15	II	Kingsgate Street			SU4810028934; 51°03′28″N 1°18′54″W		1350711	Upload Photo	Q26633883
Wall of No 15	II	Kingsgate Street			SU4809228934; 51°03′28″N 1°18′55″W		1095392	Upload Photo	Q26387714
40 Little Minster Street	II	40, Little Minster Street, SO23 9HB			SU4803629323; 51°03′40″N 1°18′57″W		1095401	Upload Photo	Q26387723
36, Middle Brook Street	II	36, Middle Brook Street	building		SU4837429627; 51°03′50″N 1°18′40″W		1173261	36, Middle Brook Street More images	Q26468032
War Memorial in the Churchyard of Holy Trinity Church	II	Middle Brook Street	war memorial		SU4835629749; 51°03′54″N 1°18′41″W		1393192	War Memorial in the Churchyard of Holy Trinity Church More images	Q26672374
41, North Walls (see Details for Further Address Information)	II	40, North Walls			SU4843729753; 51°03′54″N 1°18′37″W		1259798	Upload Photo	Q26550886
Part of the City, Palace and Castle Wall Running East from Priory Gate to Angle Near to Hall Above Magdalen Hospital	I	Palace And Castle Wall Running East From Priory Gate To Angle Near To Hall Above Magdalen Hospital, City Wall			SU4858529256; 51°03′38″N 1°18′29″W		1095505	Upload Photo	Q17528618
6, 6a and 6b, Parchment Street	II	6, 6a and 6b, Parchment Street			SU4815329551; 51°03′48″N 1°18′51″W		1173272	Upload Photo	Q26468043
7 and 8, Parchment Street	II	7 and 8, Parchment Street			SU4815929561; 51°03′48″N 1°18′51″W		1095402	Upload Photo	Q26387724
9, Parchment Street	II	9, Parchment Street			SU4816429579; 51°03′49″N 1°18′51″W		1350719	Upload Photo	Q26633890
12-14, Parchment Street	II	12-14, Parchment Street			SU4819129644; 51°03′51″N 1°18′49″W		1173285	Upload Photo	Q26468056
17-20, Parchment Street	II	17-20, Parchment Street			SU4820429677; 51°03′52″N 1°18′49″W		1088090	Upload Photo	Q26380474
71 and 72, Parchment Street	II	71 and 72, Parchment Street			SU4817329556; 51°03′48″N 1°18′50″W		1095403	Upload Photo	Q26387725
Stapenhill	II	Park Road			SU4825630875; 51°04′31″N 1°18′45″W		1393400	Upload Photo	Q26672565
Wall, Piers and Gates of Serle's House	II	Piers And Gates Of Serle's House, Southgate Street	wall		SU4789729358; 51°03′42″N 1°19′04″W		1350760	Wall, Piers and Gates of Serle's House More images	Q26633929
Music School of St Marys College	II	Romans Road	architectural structure		SU4798828863; 51°03′26″N 1°19′00″W		1296290	Music School of St Marys College More images	Q26583954
Westgate Hotel	II	2-10, Romsey Road	hotel		SU4776029595; 51°03′49″N 1°19′11″W		1095407	Westgate Hotel More images	Q26387730
16 and 18, Romsey Road	II	16 and 18, Romsey Road			SU4769629590; 51°03′49″N 1°19′15″W		1173399	Upload Photo	Q26468165
39, Romsey Road	II	39, Romsey Road			SU4746629492; 51°03′46″N 1°19′27″W		1095406	Upload Photo	Q26387729
Milestone	II	Romsey Road			SU4637029010; 51°03′31″N 1°20′23″W		1173407	Upload Photo	Q26468172
Peninsula Barracks Green Jackets Headquarters and Museum	II	Romsey Road	museum building		SU4766829509; 51°03′47″N 1°19′16″W		1258429	Peninsula Barracks Green Jackets Headquarters and Museum More images	Q26549664
Peninsula Barracks Gymnasium	II	Romsey Road			SU4776229429; 51°03′44″N 1°19′11″W		1366008	Upload Photo	Q26647644
Peninsular Barracks Chapel and Schoolroom	II	Romsey Road			SU4784729264; 51°03′39″N 1°19′07″W		1350752	Upload Photo	Q26633922
Peninsular Barracks East Block	II	Romsey Road	building		SU4774029381; 51°03′42″N 1°19′12″W		1095405	Peninsular Barracks East Block More images	Q26387727
Peninsular Barracks Guardroom	II	Romsey Road	architectural structure		SU4767429548; 51°03′48″N 1°19′16″W		1173361	Peninsular Barracks Guardroom More images	Q26468130
Peninsular Barracks Mons Block	II	Romsey Road			SU4771829555; 51°03′48″N 1°19′14″W		1095310	Upload Photo	Q26387644
Peninsular Barracks North Block	II	Romsey Road	architectural structure		SU4772729453; 51°03′45″N 1°19′13″W		1173349	Peninsular Barracks North Block More images	Q26468119
Peninsular Barracks Weapons Training Shed	II	Romsey Road	architectural structure		SU4772229331; 51°03′41″N 1°19′13″W		1350751	Peninsular Barracks Weapons Training Shed More images	Q26633921
Peninsular Barracks West Block	II	Romsey Road	building		SU4765829406; 51°03′43″N 1°19′17″W		1095404	Peninsular Barracks West Block More images	Q26387726
West Downs School (main Range)	II	Romsey Road			SU4681029405; 51°03′43″N 1°20′00″W		1350753	Upload Photo	Q26633923
West Downs School Hall and Chapel	II	Romsey Road			SU4676529402; 51°03′43″N 1°20′03″W		1095313	Upload Photo	Q26387647
West Downs School, Masters Lodge	II	Romsey Road			SU4675729366; 51°03′42″N 1°20′03″W		1350754	Upload Photo	Q26633924
Winchester Prison Entrance Gate	II	Romsey Road			SU4720729465; 51°03′45″N 1°19′40″W		1095408	Upload Photo	Q26387731
1 and 2, Rosemary Close	II	1 and 2, Rosemary Close, Blue Ball Hill			SU4865829600; 51°03′49″N 1°18′25″W		1095409	Upload Photo	Q26387732
Butterfield Wing, Royal Hampshire County Hospital	II	Royal Hampshire County Hospital, Romsey Road			SU4710929366; 51°03′42″N 1°19′45″W		1273482	Upload Photo	Q26563225
Royal Oak Public House	II	Royal Oak Passage	pub		SU4804229525; 51°03′47″N 1°18′57″W		1322135	Royal Oak Public House More images	Q26607974
Dawn House Including Attached Walling Steps and Railings	II	Sleepers Hill			SU4640528965; 51°03′29″N 1°20′21″W		1258220	Upload Photo	Q26549481
2-10, Southgate Street	II	2-10, Southgate Street			SU4793129469; 51°03′45″N 1°19′03″W		1095327	Upload Photo	Q26387662
12, Southgate Street	II*	12, Southgate Street			SU4792429449; 51°03′45″N 1°19′03″W		1095328	Upload Photo	Q17540121
Southgate Hotel	II*	14, Southgate Street	hotel		SU4791529421; 51°03′44″N 1°19′03″W		1350759	Southgate Hotel More images	Q17541733
Former Church of St Thomas and St Clement	II	20, Southgate Street, SO23 9EF	church building		SU4785129318; 51°03′40″N 1°19′07″W		1095330	Former Church of St Thomas and St Clement More images	Q21008723
23, Southgate Street	II	23, Southgate Street			SU4793129402; 51°03′43″N 1°19′03″W		1173868	Upload Photo	Q26468608
25, Southgate Street	II	25, Southgate Street			SU4792629393; 51°03′43″N 1°19′03″W		1095368	Upload Photo	Q26387694
27, Southgate Street	II	27, Southgate Street			SU4792129374; 51°03′42″N 1°19′03″W		1350737	Upload Photo	Q26633907
29, Southgate Street	II	29, Southgate Street			SU4791829363; 51°03′42″N 1°19′03″W		1173880	Upload Photo	Q26468618
31, Southgate Street	II	31, Southgate Street			SU4791729354; 51°03′42″N 1°19′03″W		1095369	Upload Photo	Q26387695
32, Southgate Street	II	32, Southgate Street			SU4791629335; 51°03′41″N 1°19′03″W		1296024	Upload Photo	Q26583707
33-39, Southgate Street	II	33-39, Southgate Street			SU4790929313; 51°03′40″N 1°19′04″W		1095370	Upload Photo	Q26387696
41-47, Southgate Street	II	41-47, Southgate Street			SU4789529272; 51°03′39″N 1°19′05″W		1350738	Upload Photo	Q26633908
49, Southgate Street	II	49, Southgate Street			SU4788729253; 51°03′38″N 1°19′05″W		1173936	Upload Photo	Q26468668
51, Southgate Street	II	51, Southgate Street			SU4788129242; 51°03′38″N 1°19′05″W		1350758	Upload Photo	Q26633928
Serle's House	II*	Southgate Street	military base		SU4786429373; 51°03′42″N 1°19′06″W		1095329	Serle's House More images	Q19972062
Master's Lodge	II	St Cross Hospital			SU4761927887; 51°02′54″N 1°19′19″W		1255550	Upload Photo	Q26547131
1, St Cross Road	II	1, St Cross Road			SU4787029205; 51°03′37″N 1°19′06″W		1095410	Upload Photo	Q26387733
3-5, St Cross Road	II	3-5, St Cross Road			SU4786629196; 51°03′36″N 1°19′06″W		1391530	Upload Photo	Q26670886
6, St Cross Road	II	6, St Cross Road			SU4784429184; 51°03′36″N 1°19′07″W		1350704	Upload Photo	Q26633877
8, St Cross Road	II	8, St Cross Road			SU4782129119; 51°03′34″N 1°19′08″W		1095377	Upload Photo	Q26387702
13, St Cross Road	II	13, St Cross Road			SU4786029168; 51°03′36″N 1°19′06″W		1173419	Upload Photo	Q26468183
17, St Cross Road	II	17, St Cross Road			SU4786229137; 51°03′35″N 1°19′06″W		1350720	Upload Photo	Q26633891
30 St Cross Road	II	30, St Cross Road			SU4774828893; 51°03′27″N 1°19′12″W		1350705	Upload Photo	Q26633878
53, St Cross Road	II	53, St Cross Road			SU4759628097; 51°03′01″N 1°19′20″W		1095411	Upload Photo	Q26387734
White Horse Public House	II	55, St Cross Road			SU4758028074; 51°03′00″N 1°19′21″W		1095307	Upload Photo	Q26387641
57, St Cross Road	II	57, St Cross Road			SU4757728047; 51°02′59″N 1°19′21″W		1095412	Upload Photo	Q26387735
59, St Cross Road	II	59, St Cross Road			SU4757428025; 51°02′59″N 1°19′22″W		1095371	Upload Photo	Q26387697
61 and 63, St Cross Road	II	61 and 63, St Cross Road			SU4757028006; 51°02′58″N 1°19′22″W		1350739	Upload Photo	Q26633909
75, St Cross Road	II	75, St Cross Road			SU4755427939; 51°02′56″N 1°19′23″W		1095372	Upload Photo	Q26387698
77, St Cross Road	II	77, St Cross Road			SU4755327933; 51°02′56″N 1°19′23″W		1095373	Upload Photo	Q26387699
79, St Cross Road	II	79, St Cross Road			SU4755127924; 51°02′55″N 1°19′23″W		1350740	Upload Photo	Q26633910
106 and 108, St Cross Road	II	106 and 108, St Cross Road			SU4756228065; 51°03′00″N 1°19′22″W		1350706	Upload Photo	Q26633879
110, St Cross Road	II	110, St Cross Road			SU4755928053; 51°03′00″N 1°19′22″W		1173442	Upload Photo	Q26468204
132, St Cross Road	II	132, St Cross Road			SU4748827785; 51°02′51″N 1°19′26″W		1350707	Upload Photo	Q26633880
134, St Cross Road	II	134, St Cross Road			SU4748427772; 51°02′50″N 1°19′26″W		1296241	Upload Photo	Q26583910
136, St Cross Road	II	136, St Cross Road			SU4748027760; 51°02′50″N 1°19′27″W		1095379	Upload Photo	Q26387704
Bindon House	II	St Cross Road			SU4748227966; 51°02′57″N 1°19′26″W		1095378	Upload Photo	Q26387703
Hospital of St Cross and Almshouses of Noble Poverty	I	St Cross Road	nonprofit organization		SU4760727750; 51°02′50″N 1°19′20″W		1095374	Hospital of St Cross and Almshouses of Noble Poverty More images	Q5908748
Lodge (Bindon Cottage)	II	St Cross Road			SU4754227986; 51°02′57″N 1°19′23″W		1061371	Upload Photo	Q26314577
Milestone	II	St Cross Road	milestone		SU4746227615; 51°02′45″N 1°19′28″W		1095376	Milestone More images	Q26387701
The Bell Inn Public House	II	St Cross Road	pub		SU4753027861; 51°02′53″N 1°19′24″W		1095375	The Bell Inn Public House More images	Q26387700
Wall of the Hospital of St John	II	St Cross Road			SU4766127779; 51°02′51″N 1°19′17″W		1350741	Upload Photo	Q26633911
The Pagoda House	II	St James Lane			SU4740229377; 51°03′42″N 1°19′30″W		1350755	Upload Photo	Q26633925
1 and 2, St James' Crescent (see Details for Further Address Information)	II	1 and 2, St James' Crescent			SU4755829338; 51°03′41″N 1°19′22″W		1350708	Upload Photo	Q26633881
1-4, Edgar Road (see Details for Further Address Information)	II	1, St James' Lane			SU4778529175; 51°03′36″N 1°19′10″W		1350670	Upload Photo	Q26633855
8 and 10, St James' Lane	II	8 and 10, St James' Lane			SU4751429353; 51°03′42″N 1°19′24″W		1173521	Upload Photo	Q26468276
12 and 12a, St James' Lane	II	12 and 12a, St James' Lane			SU4747129383; 51°03′43″N 1°19′26″W		1095381	Upload Photo	Q26387706
14 and 16, St James' Lane	II	14 and 16, St James' Lane			SU4742029382; 51°03′43″N 1°19′29″W		1095382	Upload Photo	Q26387707
Front Wall and Fence of Nos 12 and 12a	II	St James' Lane			SU4745929339; 51°03′41″N 1°19′27″W		1296203	Upload Photo	Q26583875
Front Wall and Fence of Nos 14 and 16	II	St James' Lane			SU4742529352; 51°03′42″N 1°19′29″W		1173556	Upload Photo	Q26468309
Wall and Fence of West Hill Cemetery	II	St James' Lane			SU4739829354; 51°03′42″N 1°19′30″W		1296197	Upload Photo	Q26583870
Wall of Nos 4 and 6	II	St James' Lane			SU4754529305; 51°03′40″N 1°19′23″W		1095380	Upload Photo	Q26387705
Wall of Nos 8 and 10	II	St James' Lane			SU4750129322; 51°03′41″N 1°19′25″W		1350709	Upload Photo	Q26633882
1-20, St James' Terrace	II	1-20, St James' Terrace			SU4759229477; 51°03′46″N 1°19′20″W		1095383	Upload Photo	Q26387708
3, St James' Lane (see Details for Further Address Information)	II	1-16, St James' Villas			SU4774829123; 51°03′34″N 1°19′12″W		1095384	Upload Photo	Q26387709
17, St James' Villas (see Details for Further Address Information)	II	17, St James' Villas			SU4773129209; 51°03′37″N 1°19′13″W		1173444	Upload Photo	Q26468206
21, St John's Street	II	21, St John's Street			SU4871129494; 51°03′46″N 1°18′23″W		1095385	Upload Photo	Q26387710
22, St John's Street	II	22, St John's Street			SU4871329506; 51°03′46″N 1°18′22″W		1296126	Upload Photo	Q26583803
24 and 25, St John's Street	II*	24 and 25, St John's Street	building		SU4871529536; 51°03′47″N 1°18′22″W		1095386	24 and 25, St John's Street More images	Q17540220
St John's Croft	II*	34 and 35, St John's Street			SU4873929557; 51°03′48″N 1°18′21″W		1095387	Upload Photo	Q17540232
Tudor House	II	50-52, St John's Street	house		SU4870729400; 51°03′43″N 1°18′23″W		1095389	Tudor House More images	Q26387712
Garden House at St John's Croft	II	St John's Street			SU4874529598; 51°03′49″N 1°18′21″W		1173632	Upload Photo	Q26468382
Garden Wall of St John's Croft	II	St John's Street	wall		SU4872629592; 51°03′49″N 1°18′22″W		1095388	Garden Wall of St John's Croft More images	Q26387711
Stable Block of St John's Croft	II	St John's Street			SU4876029552; 51°03′48″N 1°18′20″W		1173628	Upload Photo	Q26468378
Church of St John the Baptist	I	St Johns Street	church building		SU4870129446; 51°03′44″N 1°18′23″W		1296158	Church of St John the Baptist More images	Q17528729
Church of St Michael	II*	St Michael's Passage	church building		SU4802728924; 51°03′28″N 1°18′58″W		1350710	Church of St Michael More images	Q17541662
Friary House	II	St Michael's Road			SU4787729016; 51°03′31″N 1°19′06″W		1419305	Upload Photo	Q26676731
Church of St Paul	II	St Pauls Hill	church building		SU4766429926; 51°04′00″N 1°19′16″W		1271988	Church of St Paul More images	Q26561868
2 and 3, St Peter Street	II	2 and 3, St Peter Street			SU4807429559; 51°03′48″N 1°18′55″W		1173658	Upload Photo	Q26468405
4, St Peter Street	I	4, St Peter Street			SU4807529575; 51°03′49″N 1°18′55″W		1095390	Upload Photo	Q17528590
5, St Peter Street	II	5, St Peter Street			SU4808329591; 51°03′49″N 1°18′55″W		1095391	Upload Photo	Q26387713
Avebury House	I	6, St Peter Street	house		SU4808829614; 51°03′50″N 1°18′55″W		1173668	Avebury House More images	Q17528709
7-9, St Peter Street	II	7-9, St Peter Street			SU4810129644; 51°03′51″N 1°18′54″W		1095349	Upload Photo	Q26387679
11, St Peter Street	II	11, St Peter Street			SU4808329692; 51°03′52″N 1°18′55″W		1095350	Upload Photo	Q26387680
80, North Walls (see Details for Further Address Information)	II	12-18, St Peter Street			SU4816529782; 51°03′55″N 1°18′50″W		1095351	Upload Photo	Q26387681
19, St Peter Street	II	19, St Peter Street			SU4815629757; 51°03′54″N 1°18′51″W		1350730	Upload Photo	Q26633900
The Royal Hotel	II	22, St Peter Street			SU4810529589; 51°03′49″N 1°18′54″W		1350731	Upload Photo	Q26633901
23, St Peter Street	II*	23, St Peter Street			SU4809029547; 51°03′48″N 1°18′54″W		1095353	Upload Photo	Q17540185
Garden Wall of the Royal Hotel	II	St Peter Street			SU4810929622; 51°03′50″N 1°18′53″W		1095352	Upload Photo	Q26387682
Gateway at Rear of No 6	II	St Peter Street			SU4806229624; 51°03′50″N 1°18′56″W		1350728	Upload Photo	Q26633898
St Peter's Church Hall	II	St Peter Street			SU4807429655; 51°03′51″N 1°18′55″W		1350729	Upload Photo	Q26633899
1 and 2, St Swithun Street	II	1 and 2, St Swithun Street	building		SU4815729087; 51°03′33″N 1°18′51″W		1095354	1 and 2, St Swithun Street More images	Q26387683
3, St Swithun Street	II	3, St Swithun Street			SU4813529098; 51°03′33″N 1°18′52″W		1350733	Upload Photo	Q26633903
4, St Swithun Street	II	4, St Swithun Street			SU4811829111; 51°03′34″N 1°18′53″W		1173730	Upload Photo	Q26468474
5, St Swithun Street	II	5, St Swithun Street			SU4808929124; 51°03′34″N 1°18′55″W		1095356	Upload Photo	Q26387684
12, St Swithun Street (see Details for Further Address Information)	II	12, St Swithun Street			SU4805929134; 51°03′34″N 1°18′56″W		1350734	Upload Photo	Q26633904
25, St Swithun Street	II	25, St Swithun Street			SU4798729162; 51°03′35″N 1°19′00″W		1173756	Upload Photo	Q26468500
26 and 27, St Swithun Street	II*	26 and 27, St Swithun Street	building		SU4793329187; 51°03′36″N 1°19′03″W		1095357	26 and 27, St Swithun Street More images	Q17540197
27a and 27b, St Swithun Street	II	27a and 27b, St Swithun Street			SU4791529195; 51°03′36″N 1°19′04″W		1173767	Upload Photo	Q26468512
Kingsgate the Church of St Swithun Upon Kingsgate	I	St Swithun Street	church building		SU4814429092; 51°03′33″N 1°18′52″W		1095355	Kingsgate the Church of St Swithun Upon Kingsgate More images	Q7595507
Rear Garden Wall of Nos 1 and 2	II	St Swithun Street	architectural structure		SU4814729072; 51°03′32″N 1°18′52″W		1350732	Rear Garden Wall of Nos 1 and 2 More images	Q26633902
Remains of City Wall at Rear of No 11 and No 12 and Nos 16 to 23	II	St Swithun Street, City Wall			SU4805529129; 51°03′34″N 1°18′56″W		1167253	Upload Photo	Q26460708
K6 Telephone Kiosk	II	St Thomas Passage	K6 telephone box		SU4791629346; 51°03′41″N 1°19′03″W		1095311	K6 Telephone Kiosk More images	Q26387645
2 and 3, St Thomas Street	II	2 and 3, St Thomas Street	building		SU4803529458; 51°03′45″N 1°18′57″W		1095358	2 and 3, St Thomas Street More images	Q26387685
7, St Thomas Street	II	7, St Thomas Street			SU4802729409; 51°03′43″N 1°18′58″W		1350735	Upload Photo	Q26633905
9 and 10, St Thomas Street	II	9 and 10, St Thomas Street	building		SU4799429325; 51°03′41″N 1°18′59″W		1173784	9 and 10, St Thomas Street More images	Q26468529
12, St Thomas Street	II	12, St Thomas Street			SU4798329291; 51°03′39″N 1°19′00″W		1350736	Upload Photo	Q26633906
13, St Thomas Street	II	13, St Thomas Street			SU4795829220; 51°03′37″N 1°19′01″W		1173797	Upload Photo	Q26468542
14-17, St Thomas Street	II	14-17, St Thomas Street			SU4795029201; 51°03′37″N 1°19′02″W		1095362	Upload Photo	Q26387689
18, St Thomas Street	II	18, St Thomas Street			SU4796229285; 51°03′39″N 1°19′01″W		1095309	Upload Photo	Q26387643
18, St Thomas Street	II	18, St Thomas Street			SU4796529291; 51°03′39″N 1°19′01″W		1173808	Upload Photo	Q26387643
21 and 22, St Thomas Street	II	21 and 22, St Thomas Street			SU4795329379; 51°03′42″N 1°19′02″W		1095364	Upload Photo	Q26387691
23, St Thomas Street	II	23, St Thomas Street	building		SU4800029386; 51°03′43″N 1°18′59″W		1173836	23, St Thomas Street More images	Q26468578
24, St Thomas Street	II*	24, St Thomas Street	building		SU4800929427; 51°03′44″N 1°18′59″W		1095365	24, St Thomas Street More images	Q17540211
25 and 26, St Thomas Street	II	25 and 26, St Thomas Street			SU4801529443; 51°03′44″N 1°18′58″W		1173855	Upload Photo	Q26468596
27, St Thomas Street	II	27, St Thomas Street			SU4801629451; 51°03′45″N 1°18′58″W		1095366	Upload Photo	Q26387692
28 and 29, St Thomas Street	II	28 and 29, St Thomas Street	building		SU4802229462; 51°03′45″N 1°18′58″W		1095367	28 and 29, St Thomas Street More images	Q26387693
19a, 19b and 19c, St Thomas Street	II	19a, 19b and 19c, St Thomas Street			SU4797329341; 51°03′41″N 1°19′01″W		1095363	Upload Photo	Q26387690
Carlisle House Chernocke House	II	St Thomas Street			SU4794729276; 51°03′39″N 1°19′02″W		1095308	Upload Photo	Q26387642
Flanking Walls of No 12	II	St Thomas Street			SU4797929302; 51°03′40″N 1°19′00″W		1296058	Upload Photo	Q26583741
Garden Wall of No 12	II	St Thomas Street			SU4796829268; 51°03′39″N 1°19′01″W		1095360	Upload Photo	Q26387687
Wall of No 13	II	St Thomas Street			SU4795929243; 51°03′38″N 1°19′01″W		1095361	Upload Photo	Q26387688
Wall of No 9	II	St Thomas Street			SU4802029322; 51°03′40″N 1°18′58″W		1095359	Upload Photo	Q26387686
1, Staple Gardens	II	1, Staple Gardens			SU4791429587; 51°03′49″N 1°19′03″W		1095337	Upload Photo	Q26387669
Church Cottage	II	Stockbridge Road			SU4675830508; 51°04′19″N 1°20′02″W		1350726	Upload Photo	Q26633896
Church of St Matthew	II	Stockbridge Road	church building		SU4678630476; 51°04′18″N 1°20′01″W		1095338	Church of St Matthew More images	Q26387670
Milestone	II	Stockbridge Road			SU4660430612; 51°04′23″N 1°20′10″W		1350725	Upload Photo	Q26685417
Weeke Manor	II	Stockbridge Road			SU4664330529; 51°04′20″N 1°20′08″W		1174056	Upload Photo	Q26468780
Hampshire Archives and Local Studies	II	Sussex Street, SO23 8TH			SU4783829910; 51°04′00″N 1°19′07″W		1480912	Upload Photo	Q23305515
Christ's Hospital	II	1-7, Symonds Street	almshouse		SU4799029200; 51°03′37″N 1°19′00″W		1174075	Christ's Hospital More images	Q26468798
Symonds House	II	Symonds Street			SU4801329263; 51°03′39″N 1°18′59″W		1095340	Upload Photo	Q26387672
Upper House	II	Symonds Street			SU4800029223; 51°03′37″N 1°18′59″W		1095339	Upload Photo	Q26387671
Wall of Symonds House	II	Symonds Street			SU4801729243; 51°03′38″N 1°18′58″W		1174095	Upload Photo	Q26468817
Winchester Library	II*	The Arc, Jewry Street, SO23 8SB	public library		SU4801929763; 51°03′55″N 1°18′58″W		1095414	Winchester Library More images	Q17540256
1, the Close	I	1, The Close	house		SU4827429204; 51°03′37″N 1°18′45″W		1095513	1, the Close More images	Q17528626
Pilgrims' School	I	3, The Close	boarding school		SU4823229083; 51°03′33″N 1°18′47″W		1167387	Pilgrims' School More images	Q7757119
The Judge's Lodging	I	4, The Close	architectural structure		SU4817029132; 51°03′34″N 1°18′51″W		1350657	The Judge's Lodging More images	Q17528780
Dome Alley	I	5, 6, 7 and 8, The Close			SU4807229198; 51°03′36″N 1°18′56″W		1095518	Upload Photo	Q17528645
9, the Close	I	9, The Close	building		SU4813829168; 51°03′35″N 1°18′52″W		1350677	9, the Close More images	Q17528789
10, the Close	I	10, The Close	building		SU4814329211; 51°03′37″N 1°18′52″W		1095475	10, the Close More images	Q17528606
11, the Close	I	11, The Close	building		SU4812129266; 51°03′39″N 1°18′53″W		1350678	11, the Close More images	Q17528795
Cathedral Church of the Holy Trinity	I	The Close	Anglican or Episcopal cathedral		SU4823229265; 51°03′39″N 1°18′47″W		1095509	Cathedral Church of the Holy Trinity More images	Q476529
Cheyney Court	I	The Close	building		SU4817529079; 51°03′33″N 1°18′50″W		1095517	Cheyney Court More images	Q17528641
Close Boundary Walls and Gates Priors Gate	I	The Close			SU4836529111; 51°03′34″N 1°18′41″W		1095512	Close Boundary Walls and Gates Priors Gate More images	Q17528622
Pilgrims' Hall	I	The Close			SU4825029108; 51°03′33″N 1°18′46″W		1095516	Upload Photo	Q17528635
Porter's Lodge	I	The Close	gatehouse		SU4816729084; 51°03′33″N 1°18′51″W		1296925	Porter's Lodge More images	Q17528744
The Carnery	I	The Close	architectural structure		SU4811229288; 51°03′39″N 1°18′53″W		1350679	The Carnery More images	Q17528798
The Deanery Bakehouse	II*	The Close	architectural structure		SU4822429192; 51°03′36″N 1°18′48″W		1245544	The Deanery Bakehouse More images	Q17541023
The Old Stables	I	The Close	architectural structure		SU4819029089; 51°03′33″N 1°18′50″W		1350656	The Old Stables More images	Q17528776
Wall Between Deanery Wall and Pilgrim's Hall	II	The Close			SU4825929126; 51°03′34″N 1°18′46″W		1296908	Upload Photo	Q26584529
Wall and Path of Water Close	II	The Close	wall		SU4831929212; 51°03′37″N 1°18′43″W		1167350	Wall and Path of Water Close More images	Q26460802
Wall of No 1	II	The Close	wall		SU4823129211; 51°03′37″N 1°18′47″W		1167367	Wall of No 1 More images	Q26460817
Wall of No 11	II	The Close	wall		SU4815029239; 51°03′38″N 1°18′51″W		1095476	Wall of No 11 More images	Q26387794
Wall of No 4	II	The Close			SU4817829113; 51°03′34″N 1°18′50″W		1296890	Upload Photo	Q26584512
Wall of the Deanery	II	The Close			SU4823629158; 51°03′35″N 1°18′47″W		1095515	Upload Photo	Q26387823
Wolvesey Castle	I	The Close	castle		SU4846329088; 51°03′33″N 1°18′35″W		1095511	Wolvesey Castle More images	Q8030602
Wolvesey Palace	I	The Close	episcopal palace		SU4840329068; 51°03′32″N 1°18′39″W		1095510	Wolvesey Palace More images	Q96276762
Wolvesey Stables	II	The Close	stable		SU4833029020; 51°03′31″N 1°18′42″W		1167333	Wolvesey Stables More images	Q26460785
1 and 2, the Square	II	1 and 2, The Square			SU4816929385; 51°03′42″N 1°18′50″W		1350761	Upload Photo	Q26633930
3, the Square	II*	3, The Square	building		SU4815529389; 51°03′43″N 1°18′51″W		1095331	3, the Square More images	Q17540154
4, the Square	II	4, The Square			SU4814129393; 51°03′43″N 1°18′52″W		1095332	Upload Photo	Q26387664
5-6, the Square	II	5-6, The Square			SU4812029400; 51°03′43″N 1°18′53″W		1061373	Upload Photo	Q26314583
10, the Square (see Details for Further Address Information)	II	10, The Square			SU4807029426; 51°03′44″N 1°18′56″W		1350722	Upload Photo	Q26633893
11, the Square	II	11, The Square			SU4807729431; 51°03′44″N 1°18′55″W		1173990	Upload Photo	Q26468717
12-14, the Square	II	12-14, The Square			SU4808129445; 51°03′44″N 1°18′55″W		1095333	Upload Photo	Q26387665
15 and 16, the Square	II	15 and 16, The Square			SU4808529460; 51°03′45″N 1°18′55″W		1095334	Upload Photo	Q26387666
17, the Square	II	17, The Square			SU4809829457; 51°03′45″N 1°18′54″W		1350723	Upload Photo	Q26633894
18 and 19, the Square	II	18 and 19, The Square			SU4810329449; 51°03′45″N 1°18′54″W		1095335	Upload Photo	Q26387667
22, the Square	II	22, The Square			SU4809629435; 51°03′44″N 1°18′54″W		1174016	Upload Photo	Q26468742
23 and 24, the Square	II*	23 and 24, The Square			SU4809929429; 51°03′44″N 1°18′54″W		1350724	Upload Photo	Q17541714
The Eclipse Inn	II	25, The Square	pub		SU4810929428; 51°03′44″N 1°18′54″W		1174025	The Eclipse Inn More images	Q26468750
30 and 31, the Square	II	30 and 31, The Square			SU4814529413; 51°03′43″N 1°18′52″W		1095336	Upload Photo	Q26387668
Church of St Lawrence	II	The Square	church building		SU4810529464; 51°03′45″N 1°18′54″W		1295959	Church of St Lawrence More images	Q7593960
City Museum	II	The Square	museum		SU4810429406; 51°03′43″N 1°18′54″W		1061372	City Museum More images	Q26314580
Mill House,the Wharf	II	The Wharf, College Walk	architectural structure		SU4826928835; 51°03′25″N 1°18′46″W		1388258	Mill House,the Wharf More images	Q26667817
38-42 Tower Street	II	38-42, Tower Street			SU4789229719; 51°03′53″N 1°19′05″W		1174109	Upload Photo	Q26468831
55-63, Tower Street	II	55-63, Tower Street			SU4789829806; 51°03′56″N 1°19′04″W		1095341	Upload Photo	Q26387673
5, Upper Brook Street	II	5, Upper Brook Street			SU4822329504; 51°03′46″N 1°18′48″W		1095343	Upload Photo	Q26387675
30 and 32 Upper Brook Street	II	30 and 32, Upper Brook Street, SO23 8DG			SU4827629633; 51°03′50″N 1°18′45″W		1242706	Upload Photo	Q26535463
57, Upper Brook Street	II	57, Upper Brook Street			SU4825529618; 51°03′50″N 1°18′46″W		1174127	Upload Photo	Q26468848
Church of the Holy Trinity	II*	Upper Brook Street	church building		SU4835729722; 51°03′53″N 1°18′41″W		1350718	Church of the Holy Trinity More images	Q17541698
6, Upper High Street	II	6, Upper High Street			SU4774229631; 51°03′51″N 1°19′12″W		1095344	Upload Photo	Q26387676
19-22, Upper High Street	II	19-22, Upper High Street			SU4773429715; 51°03′53″N 1°19′13″W		1174156	Upload Photo	Q26468875
Memorial of the Plague	II*	Upper High Street	obelisk		SU4776229632; 51°03′51″N 1°19′11″W		1095345	Memorial of the Plague More images	Q17540164
Queen Elizabeth II Court	II	Upper High Street	county hall		SU4781829656; 51°03′51″N 1°19′08″W		1323707	Queen Elizabeth II Court More images	Q26609408
The First in and Last Out Public House	II	37, Wales Street	pub		SU4880129788; 51°03′55″N 1°18′18″W		1095346	The First in and Last Out Public House More images	Q26387677
53, Wales Street	II	53, Wales Street			SU4884129825; 51°03′56″N 1°18′16″W		1350750	Upload Photo	Q26633920
55-57, Wales Street	II	55-57, Wales Street			SU4884329831; 51°03′57″N 1°18′16″W		1295878	Upload Photo	Q26583572
1, Water Lane	II*	1, Water Lane	building		SU4861529316; 51°03′40″N 1°18′28″W		1095347	1, Water Lane More images	Q8023787
West End House	II	19-21, West End Terrace			SU4742229609; 51°03′50″N 1°19′29″W		1295882	Upload Photo	Q26583575
The Black Boy Public House	II	1, Wharf Hill	pub		SU4864328944; 51°03′28″N 1°18′26″W		1350727	The Black Boy Public House More images	Q26633897
37 and 38, Wharf Hill	II	37 and 38, Wharf Hill			SU4857228908; 51°03′27″N 1°18′30″W		1174181	Upload Photo	Q26468896
Black Bridge	II	Wharf Hill			SU4850428830; 51°03′24″N 1°18′34″W		1350749	Upload Photo	Q26633919
Wharf Mill	II	Wharf Hill	mill		SU4855128961; 51°03′29″N 1°18′31″W		1095348	Wharf Mill More images	Q26387678
Chernocke House, Winchester College	II	Winchester College, St Cross Road			SU4783328851; 51°03′25″N 1°19′08″W		1389671	Upload Photo	Q26669104
Du Boulays, Winchester College	II	Winchester College, Edgar Road			SU4777129090; 51°03′33″N 1°19′11″W		1389673	Upload Photo	Q26669106
Sergeants, Winchester College	II	Winchester College, Romans Road			SU4789928895; 51°03′27″N 1°19′05″W		1389672	Upload Photo	Q26669105
Science School at Winchester College	II	Winchester College	architectural structure		SU4803828712; 51°03′21″N 1°18′58″W		1389670	Science School at Winchester College More images	Q26669103
Hyde Lodge	II	Worthy Lane			SU4800030354; 51°04′14″N 1°18′59″W		1419302	Upload Photo	Q26676730
Trafalgar House	II	SO23 9DR			SU4786829509; 51°03′47″N 1°19′06″W		1095342	Upload Photo	Q26387674
Wharf Bridge, Itchen Navigation, Winchester	II	SO23 9NL			SU4853728747; 51°03′22″N 1°18′32″W		1488222	Upload Photo	Q136357687

== See also ==
- Grade I listed buildings in Hampshire
- Grade II* listed buildings in Hampshire

== Sources ==
- Bullen, Michael; Hubbuck, Rodney; Crook, John; Pevsner, Nikolaus (2010), Hampshire: Winchester and the North, The Buildings of England, New Haven and London: Yale University Press, ISBN 978-0-300-12084-4
