= Owen Browne Carter =

English architect (1806–1859)

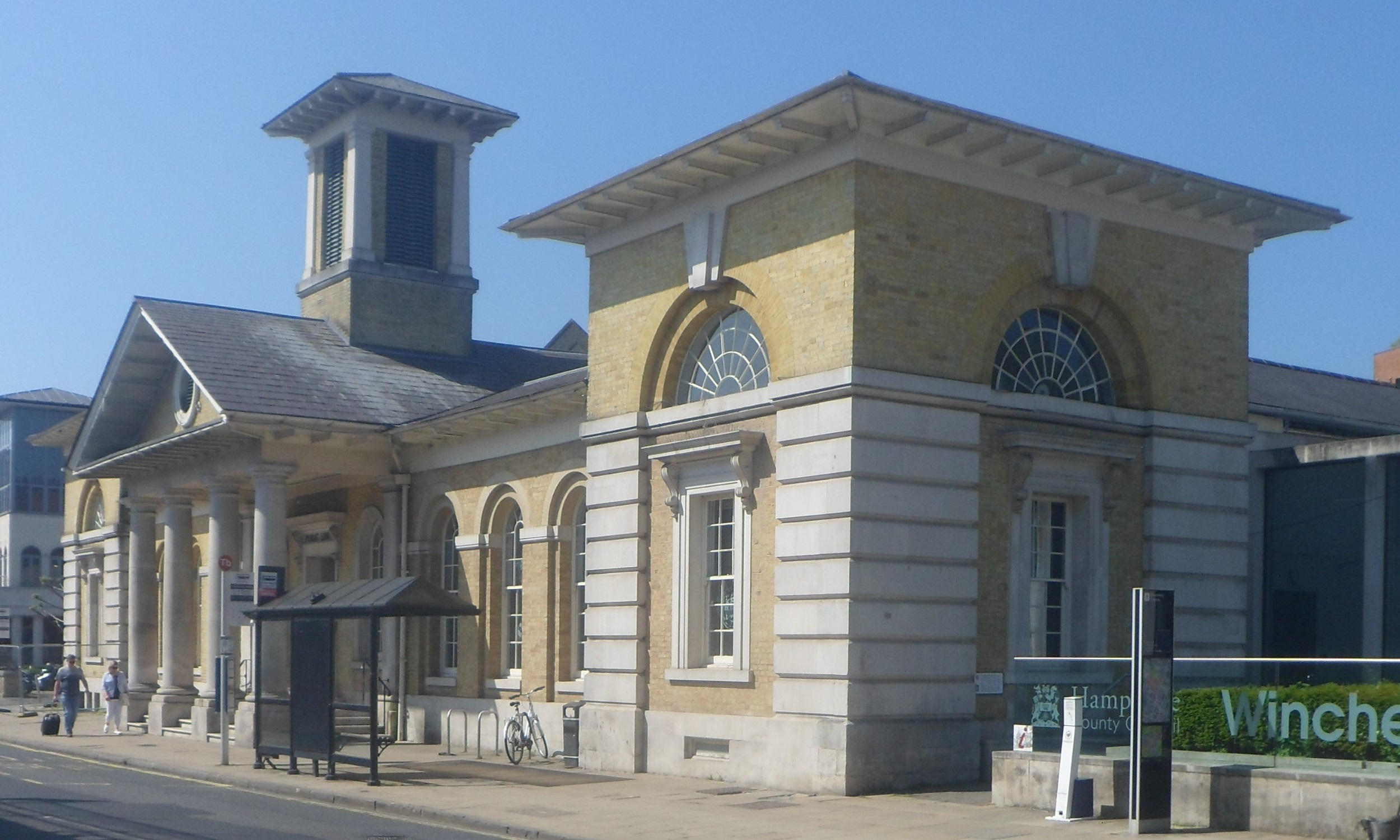
The library in Winchester, built as the Corn Exchange to Carter's designs

Owen Browne Carter (1806 – 30 March 1859) was an English architect, based in Winchester. His works include The Corn Exchange in Winchester, now the Library, Nork House in Banstead, Surrey, and several churches. He also restored the Great Hall of Winchester Palace and the Poultry Cross at Salisbury.

== Life ==
Carter was born in London in 1806. He spent 10 years employed in the office of the architect William Garbett (1770–1834) in Winchester, where he was to spend most of his life. Following Garbett's death, Carter oversaw the construction of St John's South, a group of almshouses, to his late employer's design.

In about 1829–30 he went to Egypt in the company of Robert Hay, stopping on the way in Malta. He spent some time in Cairo, where he made a large number of architectural and topographical drawings, about fifty of which are in collection of the British Museum. Some of these drawings were lithographed under Carter's supervision, and published by Hay in 1840 in a folio volume entitled Illustrations of Cairo.

In 1836 he began work on restorations and additions to Nork House, in Banstead, Surrey for Lord Arden, who had purchased the house and its large estate a few years before. The house had originally been built in 1614, but later remodelled. Carter's drawings and plans of the house are held by Metropolitan Museum in New York. The house was demolished shortly after the Second World War.

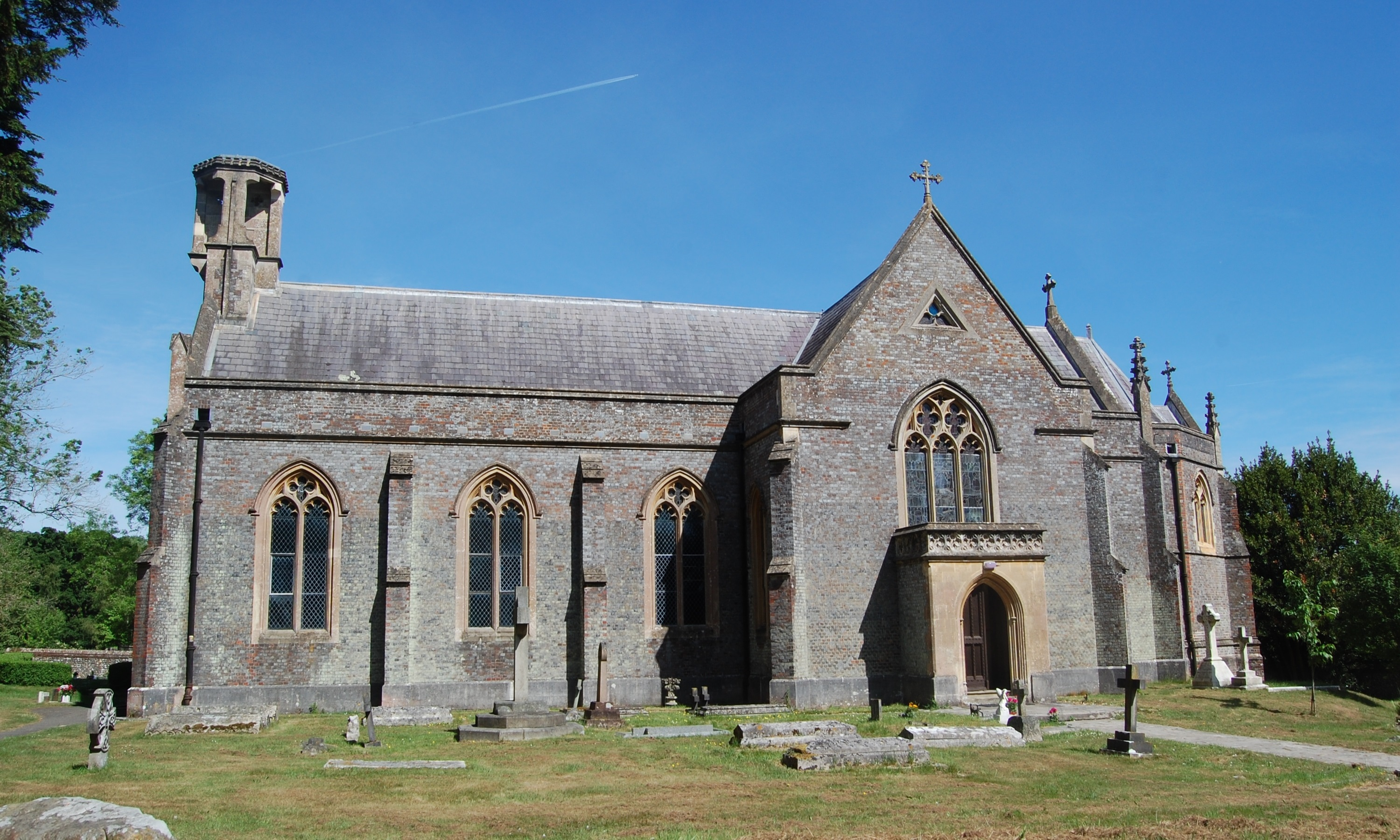
St Matthew's Church, Otterbourne, designed in collaboration with William Yonge.

Afterwards, he drew up designs for the new church of St Peter, Southampton - a Norman Revival building with an unusual "Rhenish helm" spire - and for the rebuilding of St Matthew, Otterbourne (in collaboration with the squire, William Yonge, replacing an older church about half-a-mile away), St Mary, Nutley, and St. Michael and All Angels, Knights Enham, although the last of these was not carried out. Carter was also responsible for restorations or alterations at St. Peter ad Vincula, Colemore; St. Leonard, Grately and St Leonard, Oakley, all in Hampshire.

His buildings in Winchester included the New Corn Exchange (now a public library), with a central portico modelled on that of Inigo Jones' St Paul, Covent Garden. Describing the front of the building, The Gentleman's Magazine said that Carter had "endeavored to avoid the flimsy effect of the modern Grecian school, and to keep in view the more legitimate style of design inculcated by Palladio in Italy, and at home by our own countrymen, Jones and Wren." In 1845 he restored the Great Hall of the Royal Palace at Winchester, renewing the stonework of the parapet and gables, and the plate tracery in the windows, removing the late 18th-century wooden window frames, and replacing the Georgian brick porch with one of a Gothic design.

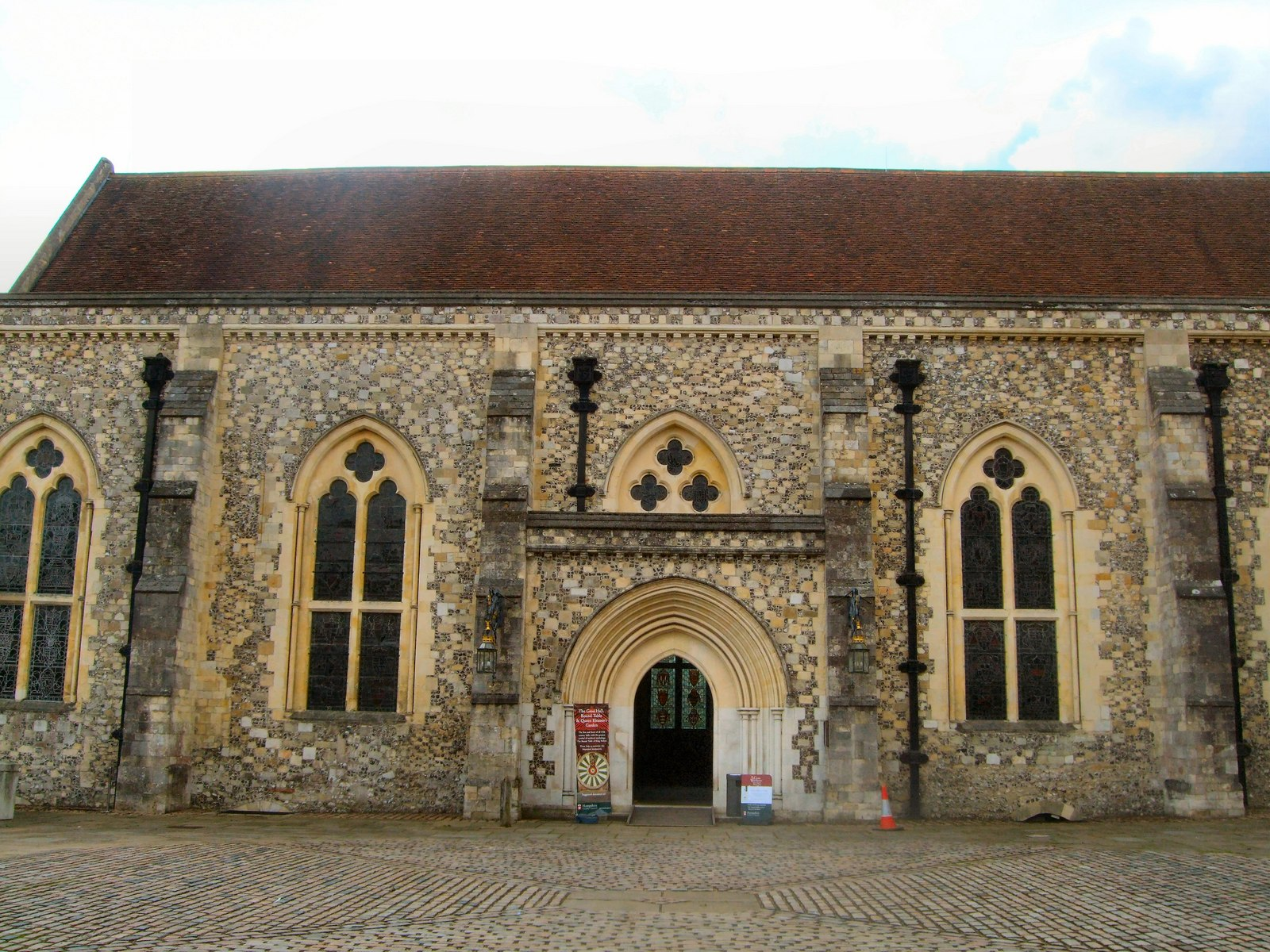
The Great Hall at Winchester, which Carter restored, replacing the Georgian porch.

He exhibited architectural drawings at the Royal Academy between 1847 and 1851, showing designs for the rebuilding of Holyrood Church, Southampton, and for restorations of the Poultry Cross at Salisbury (carried out in 1852-4) and the screen at Winchester Cathedral. His address is given in the catalogues as 22 Southgate Street, Winchester. He published some works on local subjects such as Picturesque Memorials of Winchester (1830), and contributed articles to John Weale's Quarterly Papers on Architecture on the stained-glass windows of Winchester Cathedral, on Beaulieu Abbey, and on the churches of Penton Mewsey, Headbourne Worthy, and Bishopstone. All these articles were illustrated with his own drawings.

George Edmund Street, a relative, received his initial architectural training with Carter in 1841–44.

Carter died at Salisbury on 30 March 1859, aged 53.

== Sources ==
- This article incorporates text from a publication now in the public domain: Cust, Lionel Henry (1887). "Carter, Owen Browne". In Stephen, Leslie (ed.). Dictionary of National Biography. Vol. 9. London: Smith, Elder & Co. p. 205.
