= Hyde Abbey =

Medieval Benedictine monastery

Coordinates: 51.0686°N 1.3143°W

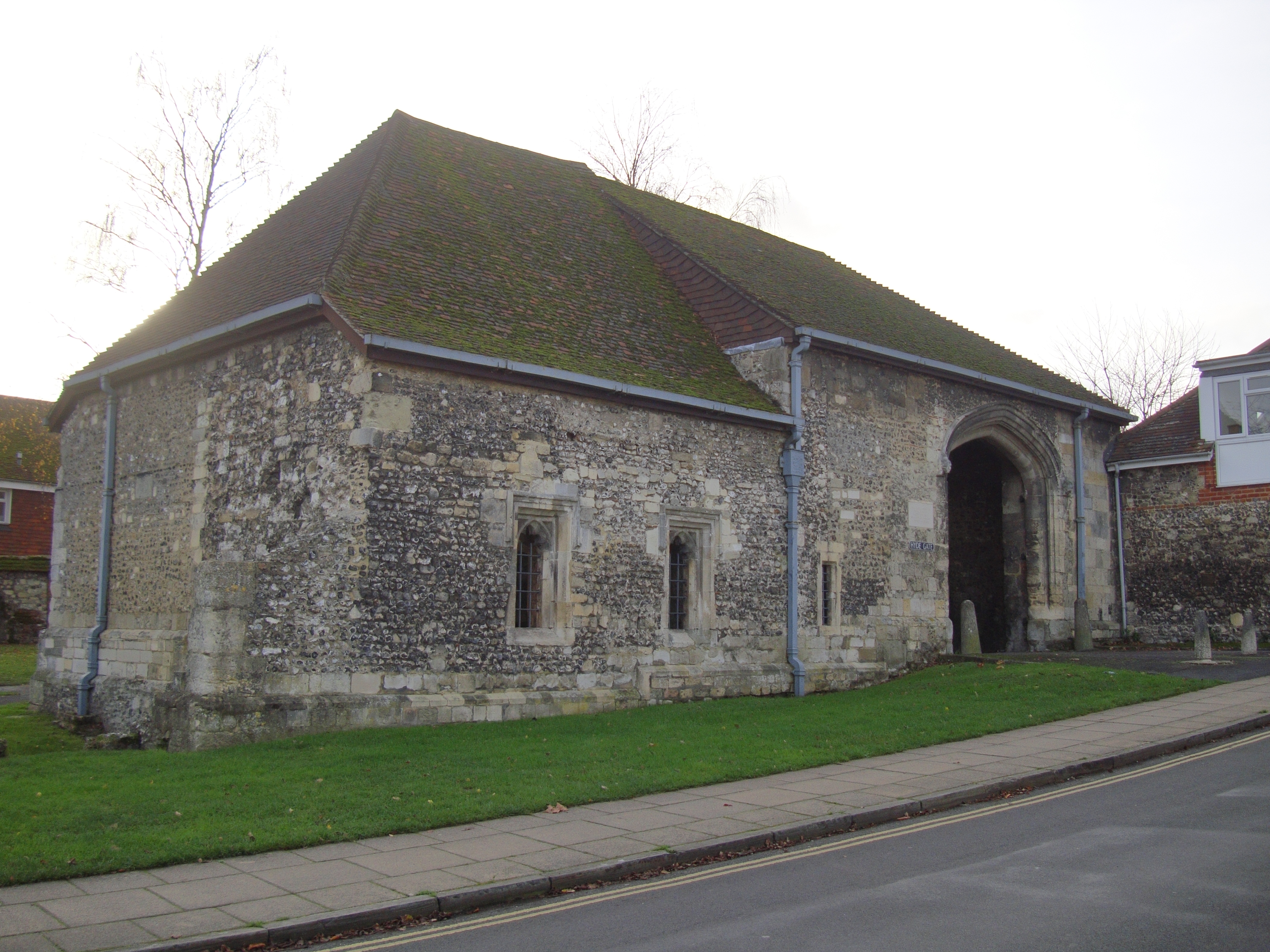
Hyde Abbey gatehouse, Winchester

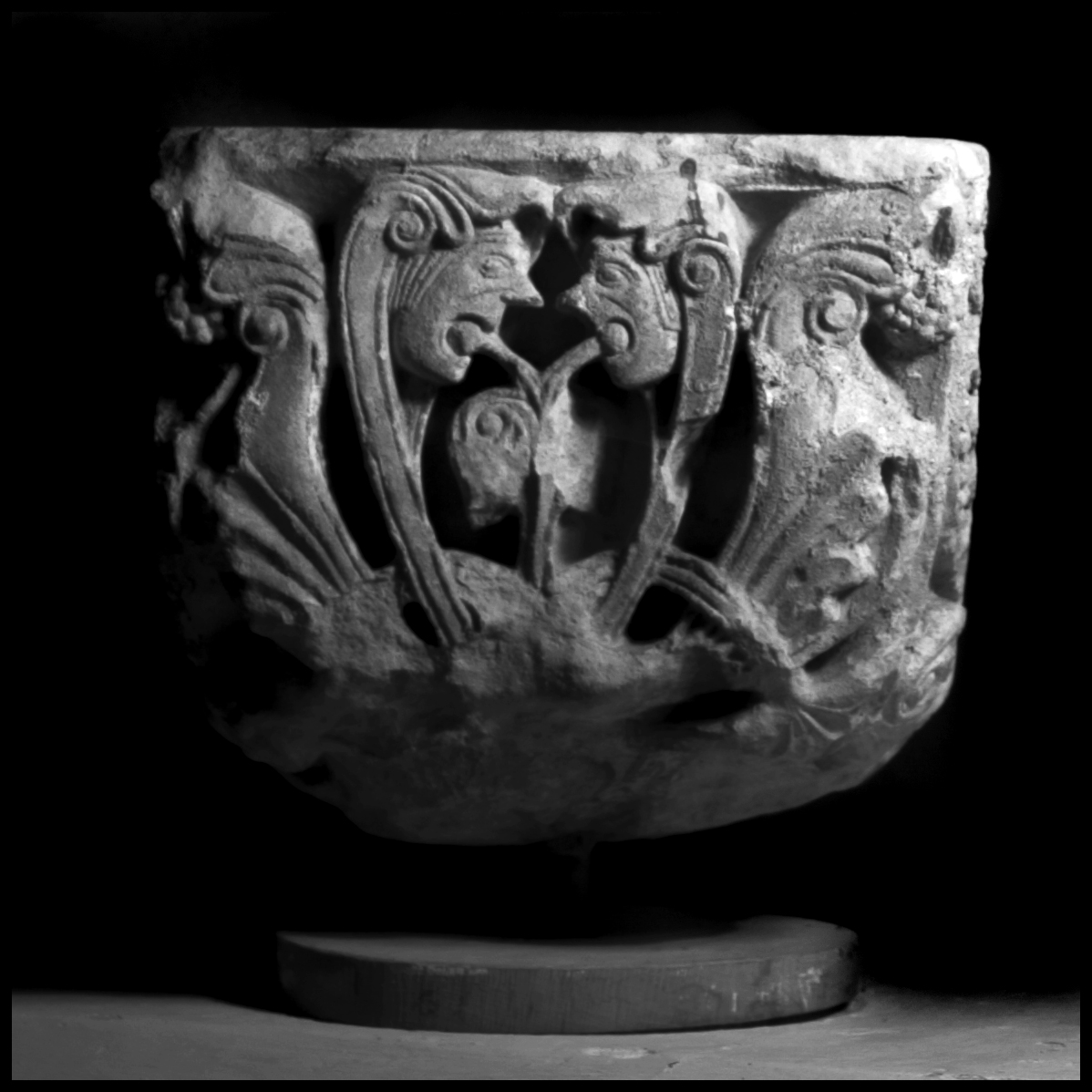
Romanesque capital from the abbey church

Hyde Abbey was a medieval Benedictine monastery just outside the walls of Winchester, Hampshire, England. It was dissolved and demolished in 1538 following various acts passed under King Henry VIII to dissolve monasteries and abbeys (see Dissolution of the Monasteries). The Abbey was once known to have housed the remains of King Alfred the Great, his son, King Edward the Elder, and his wife, Ealhswith. Following its dissolution these remains were lost; however, excavations of the Abbey and the surrounding area continue.

== History ==
When Alfred the Great re-founded the royal city of Winchester in about 880, the Saxon cathedral and the royal palace stood at the heart of the city. As the city grew, land was purchased in the city in the last year of Alfred's reign, and work was begun on the New Minster, beside the Old Minster, under the direction of Edward the Elder. When it was sufficiently complete, about 903, it was consecrated and fully endowed; the abbot Grimbald (died 8 July 901), a learned monk of St Bertin at St Omer in Flanders, was instated and the body of Alfred was re-interred in the new structure.

Several further members of the royal house were also interred in the New Minster. The gift in 1041 by Queen Emma, widow of Cnut, of the head of Saint Valentine was cherished as one of the most valuable possessions of the now-reformed Benedictine house.

In 1109 Henry I ordered the New Minster to be removed to the suburb of Hyde Mead, to the north of the city walls, just outside the gate; when the new abbey church of Hyde was consecrated in 1110, the bodies of Alfred, his wife Ealhswith, and his son Edward the Elder were carried in state through Winchester to be interred once more before the high altar. Their royal presence made Hyde Abbey a popular pilgrimage destination.

In 1141 the church suffered damage when Winchester was burned during The Anarchy arising from conflict between supporters of King Stephen and Matilda, and it had to be substantially rebuilt. Henceforward the abbey prospered and acquired considerable land in the area, until it was dissolved in 1539 by Henry VIII at the dissolution of the monasteries, and the surviving monks pensioned. The buildings were rapidly disassembled for their building materials and anything else of value. Survivors from the lost library are the cartulary (conserved in the British Library), the late-13th or early-14th century breviary and the Liber vitae, the book of the men and women this Benedictine community remembered in prayer.

Three years later, when the antiquary John Leland visited the site in 1542 the Abbey was already a thing of the past. "In this suburbe stoode the great abbay of Hyde…", he commented. "The bones of Alfredus, King of the West-Saxons, and of Edward his sunne and king, were translatid from Newanministre, and layid in a tumbe before the high altare at Hyde."

For 250 years, from 1538 until 1788, the choir end of Hyde Abbey, where Alfred and his family members were buried, was gradually forgotten about. Other parts of the abbey precinct were developed, notably the southwest corner which became a grand house. The lower eastern area, adjacent to the stream, seems to have been largely turned over to rough grazing although there are indications that it was also heaped with mounds of rubble.

In 1788 the land was taken over by the county authorities as the site of a small local prison. The convicts were put to work digging the foundations and in doing so, they started to come across a number of subterranean graves on the abbey site. One observer was the local Catholic priest Dr. Milner who wrote:

Miscreants couch amidst the ashes of our Alfreds and Edwards…..In digging for the foundations of that mournful edifice [the bridewell] at almost every stroke of the mattock or spade some ancient sepulchre was violated, the venerable contents of which were treated with marked indignity, A great number of stone coffins were dug up, with a variety of curious articles, such as chalices, patens, rings, buckles, the leather of shoes and boots, velvet and gold belonging to chasubles and other vestments as also the crook, rims and joints of a beautiful crozier, double gilt.

Today all that remains is the gatehouse that commanded the entrance between inner and outer precincts of the Abbey, an arch that used to span the abbey millstream and the church built for use of pilgrims and lay-brothers (now the nave and chancel of St Bartholomew's Parish Church).

== Burials ==
- Alfred the Great (lost)
- Edward the Elder (lost)
- Ealhswith (lost)

== Archaeological excavations ==
In the 19th century, a local antiquary carried out excavations on the site and claimed to have found the remains of King Alfred the Great, whose crypt had been ransacked for valuables and whose bones were reburied outside St Bartholomew's church, Hyde, in a simple grave.

In 1999 further archaeological excavations took place. The notes record that:

The 1999 excavations consisted of four trenches designed to gain as much information as possible about the east end of the Abbey Church. ...

Two phases of construction were identified. The church, as built in 1110, was constructed of flint and chalk rubble bonded by a pale brown chalky mortar. ... The choir was defined by the arcade that separated the body of the church from the surrounding ambulatory. ... Pilgrims, visiting shrines and chapels located at the east end of the church, would have walked along the ambulatory alongside the choir. One such chapel, projecting from the south side of the church, consisted of a small rectangular room with an apsidal east end. Part of a second chapel, of similar plan, was identified to the north of the church.

The original east end of the 1110 church consisted of a small chapel that had been rebuilt in the late 12th or early 13th century using a pale, honey coloured, fine-grained limestone bonded by a hard orange mortar.

The stratigraphic sequence suggests that the original chapel was standing while the new structure was built. It was demolished on completion of the work, possibly to limit the interruption to services. The date of construction is uncertain, but it may be associated with the programme spurred on by the 'miraculous events' that occurred at the shrine of St. Barnabas in 1182.

....Directly in front of the high altar was a group of deep intercutting pits that represent past attempts to find the tomb of Alfred the Great. At the dissolution of the Abbey in 1539, graves in front of the high altar are said to have produced small lead tablets bearing the names Alfred and Edward. No archaeological trace of this first recorded breaching has survived, but subsequent discoveries suggest that the graves were left intact. Within a year the church and cloisters were demolished and the site of the church was lost from the landscape. However, late 18th century maps show that the site was littered with mounds of rubble....

A few years after the event, the site was visited by Captain Howard, a noted antiquarian, who was aware of the discoveries made by Henry VIII's Commissioners. He interviewed Mr Page, the Prison Warden, who told him that during works in the Governor's garden the site of the high altar was found, with three graves located before it.

The coffin thought to be Alfred's was made of a single block of stone encased with lead. He was also told of its fate – the prisoners threw the bones about, broke up the coffin and sold the lead. Then the original grave pit was dug deeper to the level of the water table, and the broken coffin reburied.

The earliest pit in the area accords well with Page's description. It extended across the full width of the high altar area and had been dug down to the water table.... Slight hints of earlier cuts were found that might represent the three royal tombs.

== Property ==
In 1086, the Domesday Book recorded holdings of land at Addeston, Collingbourne, Pewsey, Manningford and Chisledon, all in Wiltshire. The former name Collingbourne Abbot's and the present-day Manningford Abbots reflect this connection.

== See also ==
- List of monastic houses in Hampshire
- List of abbeys and priories in England
