= Corn Exchange, Winchester =

Commercial building in Winchester, Hampshire, England

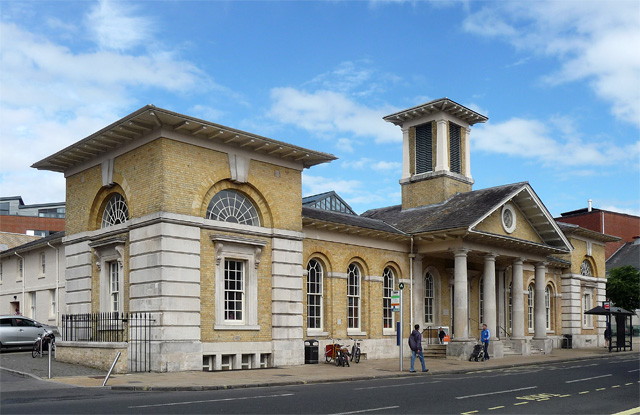
- Corn Exchange, Winchester

- Shown in Hampshire
- 51.0653°N 1.3162°W
- Location: Jewry Street, Winchester

History
- Built: 1838

Site notes
- Architect: Owen Browne Carter
- Architectural style: Italianate style

Listed Building – Grade II*
- Official name: Winchester Library
- Designated: 24 March 1950
- Reference no.: 1095414

The Corn Exchange, also known as The Arc, is a commercial building in Jewry Street in Winchester, Hampshire, England. The structure, which is currently used as a cultural hub, is a Grade II* listed building.

== History ==
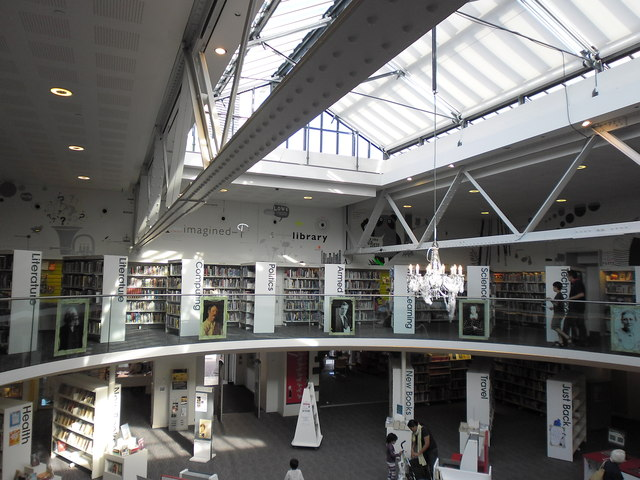
Inside the building

In the mid-1830s, a group of local businessmen decided to form a private company, known as the "Winchester Corn Exchange Company", to finance and commission a corn exchange for the town. The site they selected was open ground which had been occupied by a garden known as "Forstersplace" in the 15th century.

The new building was designed by Owen Browne Carter in the Italianate style, built in yellow brick with stone dressings at a cost of £4,000 and was completed in 1838. The design involved a symmetrical main frontage of eleven bays facing onto Jewry Street with the end bays projected forward as pavilions. The central section of three bays featured a portico formed by four Tuscan order columns supporting an entablature, a cornice with wide eaves and a modillioned pediment. The wings were fenestrated by round headed windows with voussoirs and, at roof level, there was a central bell turret. The portico was modelled on that designed by Inigo Jones for St Paul Covent Garden. Describing the front of the building, The Gentleman's Magazine said that Carter had "endeavored to avoid the flimsy effect of the modern Grecian school, and to keep in view the more legitimate style of design inculcated by Palladio in Italy, and at home by our own countrymen, Jones and Wren."

The use of the building as a corn exchange declined significantly in the wake of the Great Depression of British Agriculture in the late 19th century. It was converted for use as a roller-skating rink in 1906, as a theatre in 1915 and then as a cinema in 1917. After that, it became a dance hall in 1922, a cinema again in 1933 and finally a public library in 1936. Hampshire County Council took over management of the building in 1974.

A major programme of works, costing £7 million, to convert the building into a "Discovery Centre" was completed in February 2008. The works involved the creation of an exhibition room on the ground floor. The building was officially re-opened by Duchess of Cornwall on 21 February 2008. A further programme of refurbishment works, costing £715,000, leading to the re-branding of the building as a "Cultural Hub" was completed in February 2022. Space in the building was reconfigured to make more space for exhibitions on the mezzanine floor, but the library continued to occupy most space. The Hampshire Cultural Trust took over the management of the building, which was re-branded as "The Arc", at that time.

== See also ==
- Corn exchanges in England
- Grade II* listed buildings in City of Winchester
