= Otterbourne =

Village and parish in Hampshire, England

Coordinates: 51.00724°N 1.34288°W

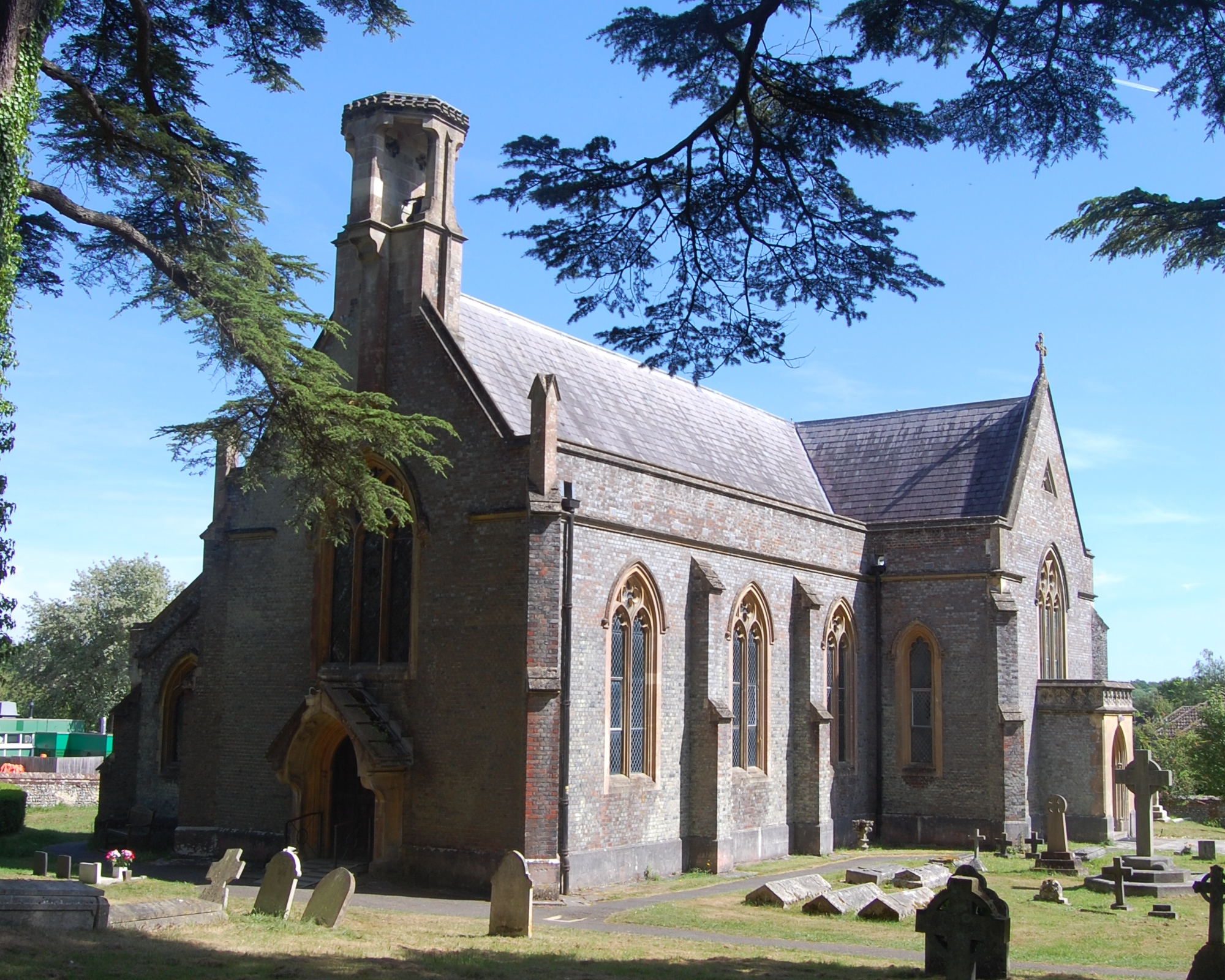
- St Matthew's Church

- Location within Hampshire
- Population: 1,539
- Civil parish: Otterbourne
- District: City of Winchester
- Shire county: Hampshire
- Region: South East
- Country: England
- Sovereign state: United Kingdom
- Post town: WINCHESTER
- Postcode district: SO21
- Dialling code: 01962
- Police: Hampshire and Isle of Wight
- Fire: Hampshire and Isle of Wight
- Ambulance: South Central
- UK Parliament: Winchester
- Website: Otterbourne Parish Council

Otterbourne is a village in Hampshire, England. It is located approximately four miles (6.4 km) south of Winchester and eight miles (13 km) north of Southampton. At the 2011 census, its population was 1,539, and there were 626 dwellings.

There are three public houses in the village: the White Horse Inn, the Otter, and the Old Forge. There is also a school, a post office and village shop. Before the 21st century, the post office and village shop were located opposite Cranbourne Drive at the bottom of Otterbourne Hill. However, at the end of the 1990s, the car garage at the centre of the village was rebuilt to include a petrol station and convenience store. It has subsequently been taken over by Nisa Local convenience store, and the petrol station has been decommissioned. In the early hours of 30 November 2015, William's Garage beside Budgens suffered from a fire.

The Otterbourne Brass, performs in Otterbourne Village Hall every Christmas and concerts in and around the surrounding area. The band also competes in the 1st Section of the National Brass Band Championships of Great Britain.

Famous people from Otterbourne include Chris Tremlett who plays cricket for England and Surrey and novelist Charlotte Mary Yonge.

== History ==
The village of Otterbourne, on the stream Otter Bourne, lies on the old Roman road between Venta Belgarum (Winchester) and Clausentum (Southampton). It appears in the Domesday Book as Otrebourne. The physicist Sir Isaac Newton lodged at Cranbury House in his twilight years, and John Keble, a leader of the Oxford Movement, settled down as vicar of the parish church, St Matthew's, around 1838.

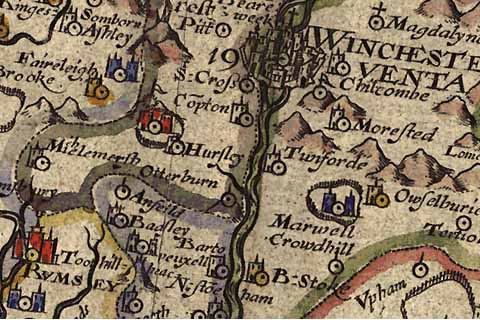
Map showing Otterbourne dated 1607

At that time, Otterbourne's novelist Charlotte Mary Yonge (1823–1901) was 15 years old; her writings were influenced by Keble's sermons. In her day, she was a major celebrity, publishing more than 100 novels.

Already by 1840, however, the London to Southampton railway opened (later the South West Main Line), passing by the village. Within half a century, old Otterbourne had been abandoned, and the village moved half a mile east to its present location.

Charlotte Yonge lived the second half of her life in a house named Elderfield, which between 1959 and 2019 was a Residential Training Centre for former offenders run by the Langley House Trust, a registered charity. On 17 August 2005, resident Anthony Rice murdered Naomi Bryant at her home in Winchester, prompting an independent review (pdf) of his case by HM Inspectorate of Probation.

== Waterworks ==
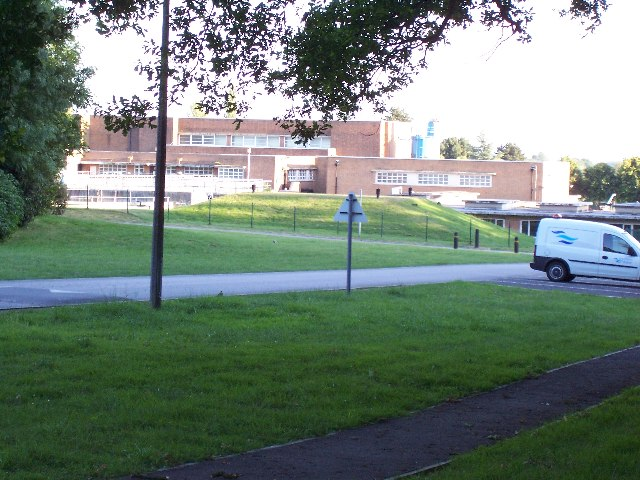
Otterbourne Water Supply Works

Prior to the centralisation of its regional offices, Otterbourne was home to the Hampshire headquarters of Southern Water. The 1980s office building (part of which was leased to the Audit Commission) is situated on the site of a large water supply works, which takes water from the River Itchen and a number of boreholes. Otterbourne water supply works feeds a covered reservoir in the village, which in turn supplies most of the eastern side of Southampton. Water is also pumped to a covered reservoir at Yew Hill in Olivers Battery Community Parish.

Following Southern Water's £20.3 million fine for 'deliberate misreporting' and failing to meet guaranteed standards of service to customers in 2007, the company shut down its use of the Otterbourne building and leased it to two NHS organisations; South Central Ambulance Service and Health Education Wessex.

== Church ==
The village church is dedicated to Saint Matthew. It was built over two years from 1837 to a design by Owen Browne Carter and William Crawley Yonge. Some the internal fittings are older than the church including a carved panel on the pulpit dating from the 15th century.

== Notable people ==
- Charlotte Mary Yonge (1823–1901), was an English novelist
- Jim Bailey (1908–1988), first-class cricketer
- Chris Tremlett (cricketer) (born 1981), first-class cricketer
