= St Bartholomew's Church, Winchester =

Coordinates: 51.068886°N 1.314323°W

St Bartholomew's Church, Hyde, Winchester
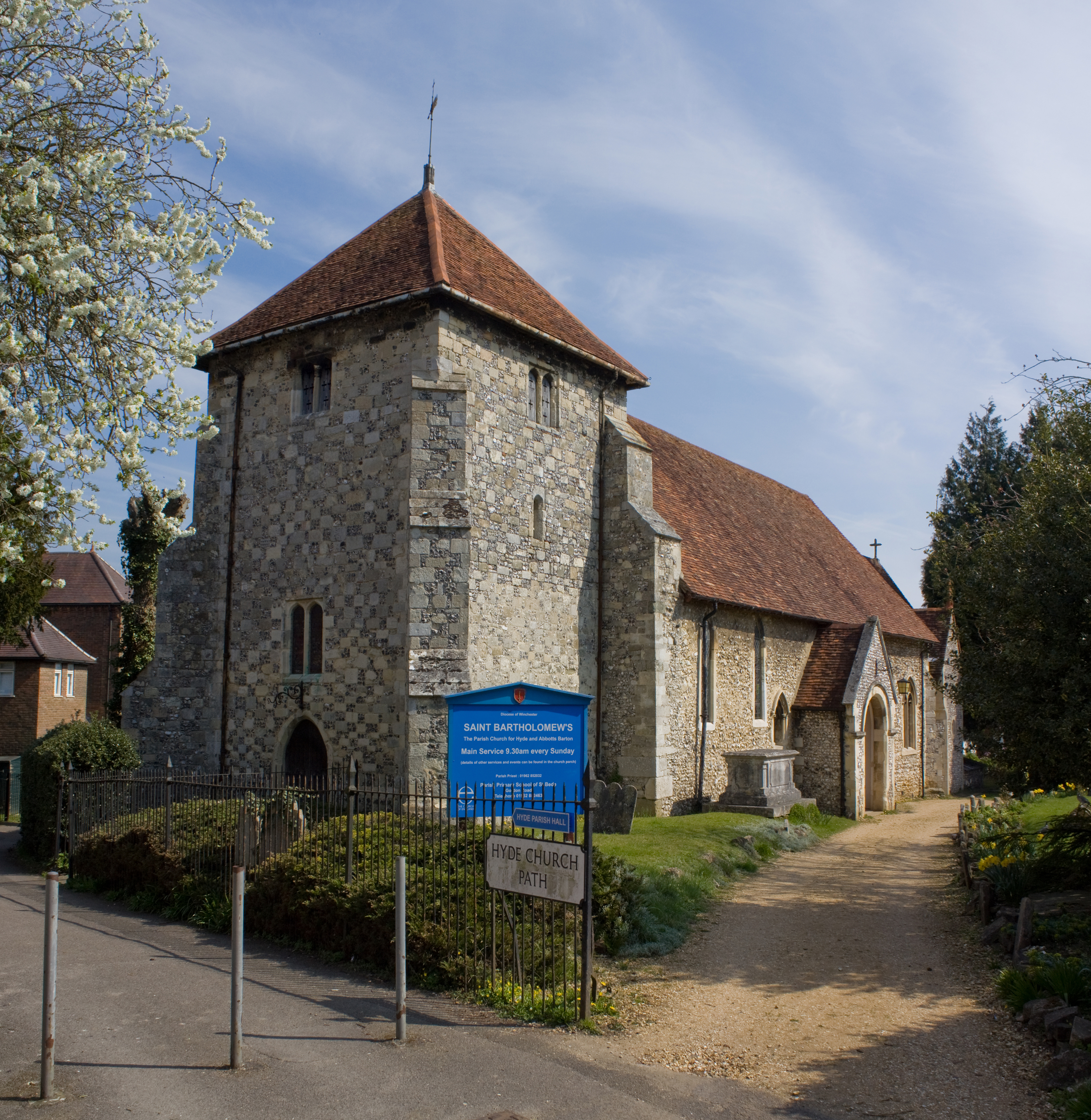
- St Bartholomew's Church, Hyde, Winchester
- OS grid reference: SU 48140 30174
- Country: England
- Denomination: Church of England
- Website: www.threesaints.org.uk

Architecture
- Years built: C12, tower C16, modified C19

Administration
- Diocese: Winchester
- Deanery: Winchester

Clergy
- Rector: Rev'd Karen Kousseff

St Bartholomew's Church, Winchester is a Church of England parish church in Hyde, Winchester, England.

St Bartholomew's is the parish church of Hyde, formerly a village outside the walls of Winchester, now a suburb of the city. The church was built to serve the tenants and lay officials of Hyde Abbey (established 1110, dissolved and demolished 1539). The tower was built in 1541 using stones from the abbey; the chancel was rebuilt and the rest of the church restored in the 19th century.

The church is a Grade II* listed building.

For more details, times of services and opening times, please see the website.
