= Holy Trinity Church, Winchester =

Coordinates: 51.064827°N 1.311276°W

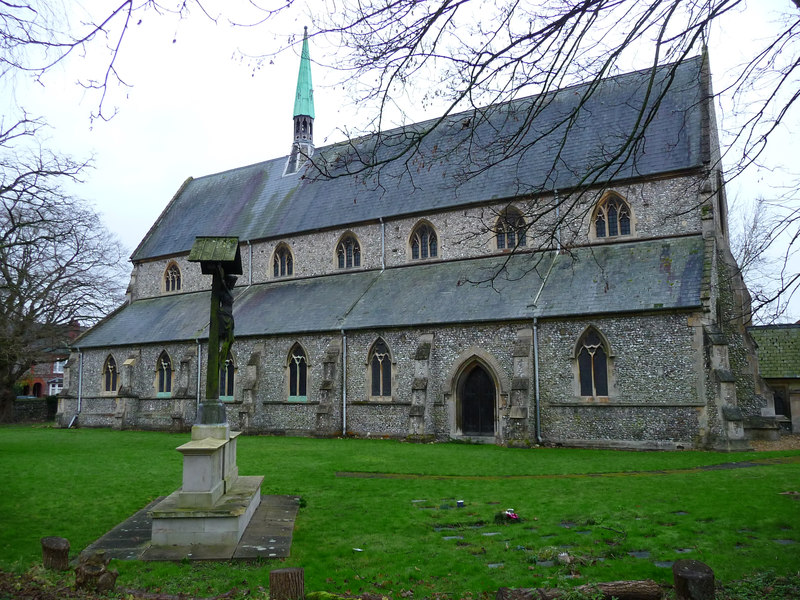
- Holy Trinity Church, Winchester
- OS grid reference: SU 48357 29722
- Address: Upper Brook Street, Winchester
- Country: England
- Denomination: Church of England
- Churchmanship: Anglo-Catholic
- Website: Official website

History
- Consecrated: July 1854

Architecture
- Architect: Henry Woodyer
- Style: "Early Decorated"
- Years built: 1852-54
- Construction cost: £4,780

Administration
- Diocese: Winchester
- Deanery: Winchester

Clergy
- Bishop: The Rt Revd Norman Banks (AEO)
- Priest: The Revd Jamie Franklin

Holy Trinity Church, Winchester is a Church of England parish church in Winchester, in Hampshire, England.

== History ==
Holy Trinity is a Commissioners' church, one of many built with money voted by Parliament as a result of the Church Building Acts of 1818 and 1824. The Second Parliamentary Grant, provided by the Church Building Act 1824, gave £300 towards the building of Holy Trinity Church. It was designed by Henry Woodyer in a neo-Gothic style.

Work began in February 1852, and the building was opened and consecrated in July 1854. It was built on a plot named Whitebread Mead.

On 14 January 1974, the church was designated a grade II* listed building.

=== Present day ===
Holy Trinity Church stands in the Catholic tradition of the Church of England. The parish has passed resolutions to reject the ordination of women, and is a member of Forward in Faith and The Society. The parish receives alternative episcopal oversight from the Bishop of Richborough (currently Luke Irvine-Capel).

Since the summer of 2023, Rev. Jamie Franklin has served as the Parish Priest. He is also an author, as well as the host of the podcast Irreverend: Faith and Current Affairs.

Sunday Mass takes place each Sunday at 10:30am.
