= Recreational walks in Hampshire =

Walking routes in Hampshire, England

The following are lists of recreational walks in Hampshire, England:

== Short Walks ==
- Blackwater Valley Path, Hollybush Pits to Coleford Bridge Near The Quays Grid ref: SU 886 534
- Grange Farm, a series of circular walks at Tichborne, south of New Alresford
- Hamble Common has a waymarked circular walk
- The Hayling Billy Trail (part of which is called the Hayling Billy Coastal Path), runs from the centre of Havant to the south of Hayling Island
- Itchen Valley Country Park has various waymarked trails.
- Mottisfont Abbey Estate Walk, near Romsey — 11 kilometres.
- Ober Water walks of 1.5 and 2 kilometres at Whitefield Moor near Brockenhurst
- Pilcot Farm circular walk from Dogmersfield (to the west of Fleet)
- Pucknall Farm circular walk, starting from behind the Wheatsheaf Inn at Braishfield near Romsey
- Queen Elizabeth Country Park near Petersfield contains a total of about 32 kilometres of trails and paths
- Sydmonton Common walk, a circular walk to the south of the A339 near Bishop's Green
- Tall Trees Trail, 2 kilometre circular from either Blackwater or Brock Hill near Brockenhurst
- The Vyne circular walks, signposted off the A340 road north of Basingstoke
- West End farm, circular walks at Upper Froyle between Farnham and Alton
- West Walk near Bere, 2 circular walks described as being 1 and 2 hours duration respectively
- Wilverley Wander, 3 kilometres from Wilverley Plain between Brockenhurst and Burley

== Longer walks ==
- Blackwater Valley Path, 37 kilometres, Hampshire and Berkshire
- Clarendon Way, 38.5 kilometres from Salisbury to Winchester
- Hangers Way, 34 kilometres from Alton to Queen Elizabeth Country Park outside Petersfield
- Meon Valley Trail, 16 kilometres from Wickham to West Meon
- Soberton and Newtown Millennium Walk 2000, 16 kilometre circular walk
- Staunton Way, 33 kilometres
- Strawberry Trail, a 24 kilometre circular walk

== Long-distance paths ==
- Avon Valley Path, 54.5 kilometres Christchurch to Salisbury (Hampshire and Wiltshire)
- Bournemouth Coast Path, 59.5 kilometres from Sandbanks to Milford-on-Sea (Dorset and Hampshire)
- Hampshire Millennium Pilgrims Trail, 48 kilometres from Winchester to Portsmouth
- Itchen Way, 43.5 kilometres from Hinton Ampner to Woolston, Hampshire
- King's Way, 72 kilometres from Winchester to Portchester
- Solent Way, Christchurch — Emsworth 112 kilometres
- South Downs Way National Trail, 160 kilometres from Winchester to Eastbourne, East Sussex
- St. Swithun's Way, 55 kilometres Winchester to Farnham, Surrey
- Test Way, 70.5 kilometres from Walbury Hill, Berkshire to Totton
- Three Castles Path, Windsor to Winchester, 96 kilometres
- Wayfarers Walk, 110 kilometres from Walbury Hill to Emsworth (Berkshire, Hampshire)
- Brenda Parker Way, 125 km from Andover to Aldershot

== See also ==
- Long-distance footpaths in the UK
