= Itchen Valley =

Civil parish in Hampshire, England

Coordinates: 51.090°N 1.252°W

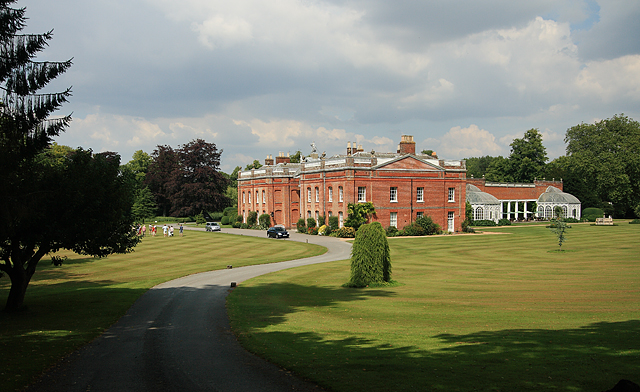
- Avington Park

- Location within Hampshire
- OS grid reference: SU530319
- Civil parish: Itchen Valley
- District: City of Winchester
- Shire county: Hampshire
- Region: South East
- Country: England
- Sovereign state: United Kingdom
- Post town: Winchester
- Postcode district: SO21
- Dialling code: 01962
- Police: Hampshire and Isle of Wight
- Fire: Hampshire and Isle of Wight
- Ambulance: South Central
- UK Parliament: Winchester

Itchen Valley is a civil parish in the English county of Hampshire. Forming part of the City of Winchester district, it comprises the villages of Avington, Easton, Itchen Abbas and Martyr Worthy, with a population of 1,267 at the time of the 2001 Census, increasing at the 2011 Census to a population of 1,459.

It is to the northeast of Winchester and takes its name from the River Itchen. The parish is crossed by the M3 motorway, and contains Winchester services. The main West–east route through the parish is the B3047. East bound from Winchester the B3047 enters the parish at Worthy Park and exits it at a point approx. 300m East of Rectory Lane, Itchen Abbas. It is located near to the civil parishes of Itchen Stoke and Ovington and New and Old Alresford.

Largely rural in character, much of the parish is in both the South Downs National Park and the East Hampshire Area of Outstanding Natural Beauty, and is crossed by several designated walking paths and riding routes including the Itchen Way, King's Way, Pilgrims' Way, St. Swithun's Way, South Downs Way, Three Castles Path and Oxdrove Way.

== Governance ==
Itchen Valley Parish Council has eleven councillors who hold various portfolios concerning the local area. Itchen Valley is part of the Hampshire County Council Ward of the same name, which has larger borders and also includes settlements such as Alresford. The ward has been represented by Jackie Porter since 2005, who was most recently reelected in 2017. As part of Winchester City Council is forms part of Alresford and Itchen Valley ward, which since 2016 has had three councillors. As of the 2019 election, these are:

Election	Member	Ward
2016	Lisa Griffiths	Alresford & Itchen Valley
2018	Margot Power	Alresford & Itchen Valley
2019	Russell Gordon-Smith	Alresford & Itchen Valley
