= Itchen Way =

Long-distance footpath in Hampshire, England

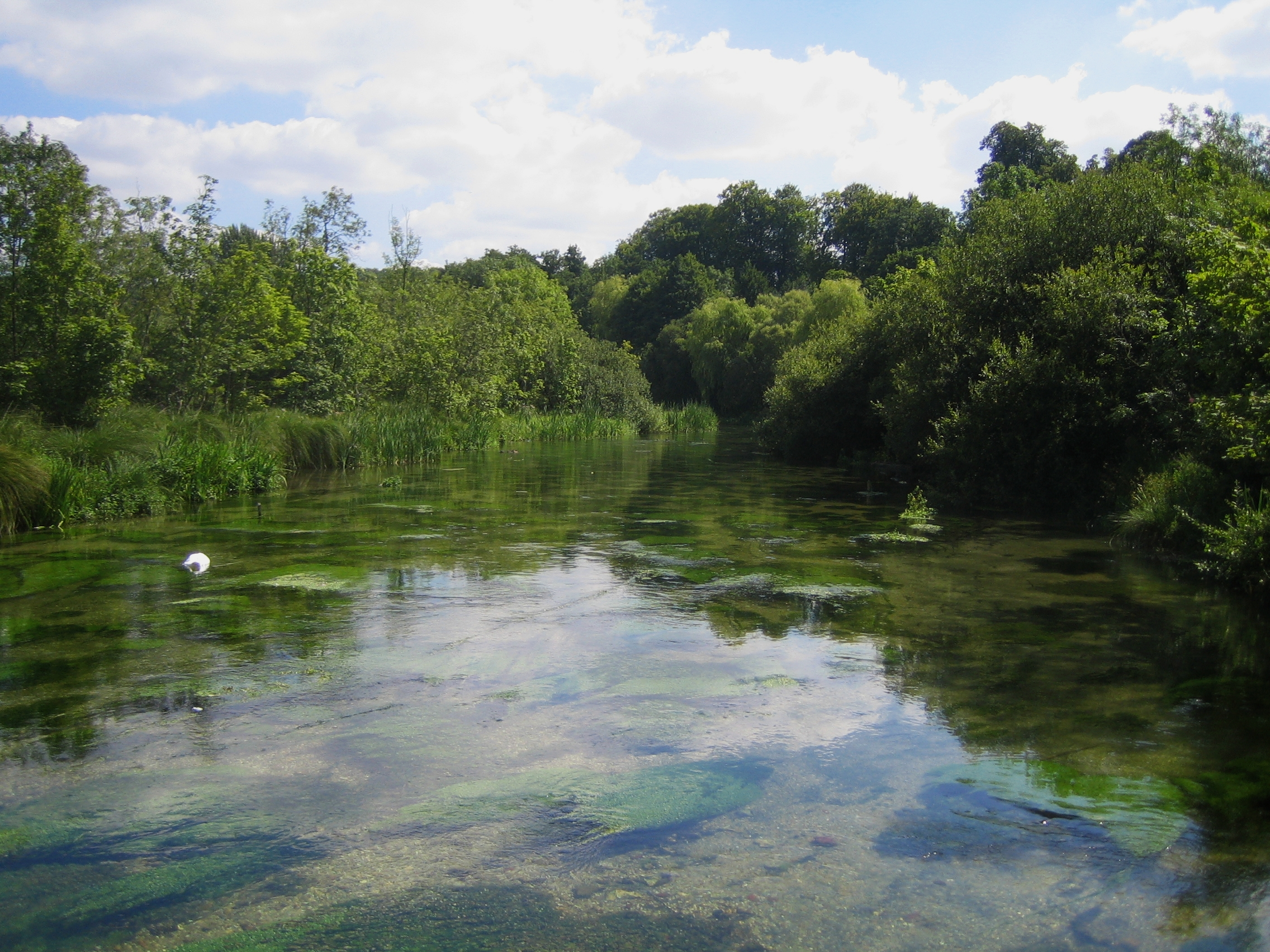
- The Itchen Way follows the River Itchen; this is near Avington
- Length: 31.8 mi (51.2 km)
- Location: Hampshire, England
- Trailheads: Hinton Ampner Gardens 51.04109°N 1.14974°W; Woolston; 50.897°N 1.371°W; Sholing 50.89688°N 1.36506°W
- Use: Hiking
- Season: All year

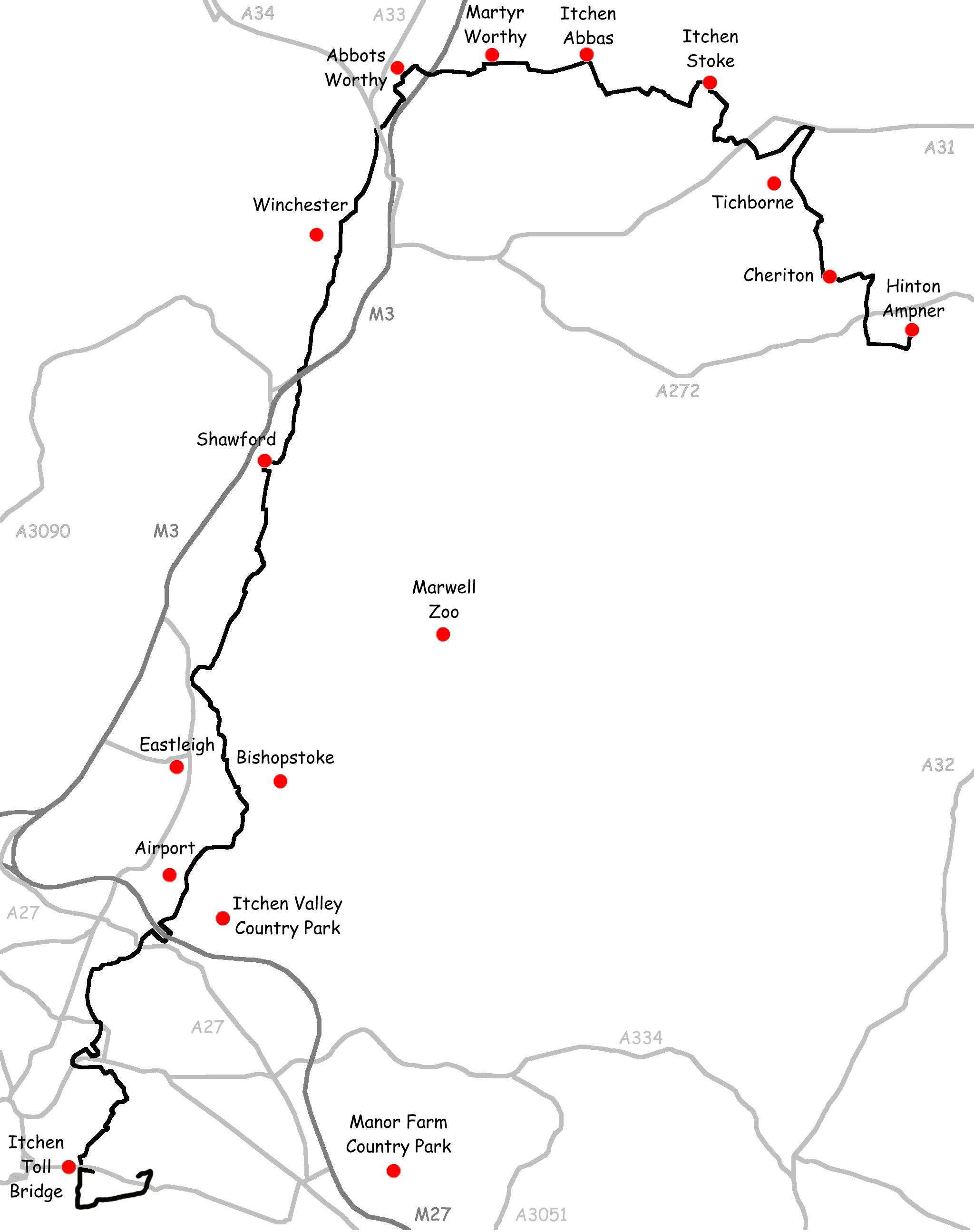
The footpath in relation to nearby major roads

The Itchen Way is a 31.80-mile (51.18 km) long-distance footpath following the River Itchen in Hampshire, England, from its source near Hinton Ampner House to its mouth at Woolston. The walk finishes at Sholing railway station. The route has been promoted by the Eastleigh Group of the Ramblers with grant aid from Hampshire County Council and Eastleigh Borough Council. The route was altered and improved in 2008.

== Route ==
The northern part of the path is within the South Downs National Park and follows the valley of the River Itchen from close to its source at Hinton Ampner. The route passes the springs at the head of the river, before running through New Cheriton, Cheriton. At Tichborne, after touching the edge of New Alresford, the path cuts the corner to Ovington. The river is crossed several times, to Itchen Stoke, Avington and Itchen Abbas. From here the path stays on the right bank to Martyr Worthy.

Between Martyr Worthy and Abbots Worthy the Itchen Way, King's Way, St. Swithun's Way and Three Castles Path form a network either side of the river, allowing various routes to be followed.

From Martyr Worthy the waymarked Itchen Way crosses the river twice to loop through Easton. Back on the right bank the path passes through a tunnel under the M3 motorway to Abbots Worthy, before again crossing the Itchen to join the Three Castles Path (St. Swithun's way and King's Way continuing to Winchester on the right bank). Heading south the Itchen Way passes under the A34 before running parallel with the former route of the former Didcot, Newbury and Southampton Railway between the Winnall Moors nature reserve and the Winnall industrial estate. After a short section along roads it enters Winchester at Durngate. The route then passes along the river through the historic centre of Winchester before following the Itchen Navigation, again running parallel with the former railway past the foot of St. Catherine's Hill.

After again passing under the M3 at the foot of Twyford Down, the Navigation and path cross to the west of the river, past Shawford, Otterbourne and Allbrook, Eastleigh and Bishopstoke. A short diversion beyond Bishopstoke gives access to Itchen Valley Country Park. South of the M27 the path crosses the western suburbs of Southampton. From the mouth of the river at Weston Point, Woolston, an extension of the path runs inland to Millers Pond and Sholing station.

However, taking this route back-to-front, ie South to North will take a rambler from urban Southampton into the countryside and the route ends at the Wayfarer's Walk which enables the journey to be extended.

== Other paths ==
Between Weston Shore and the Itchen Toll Bridge the path shares its route with the Solent Way. The northern end joins the Wayfarers Walk. The path also crosses, joins or shares sections of route with a number of long distance paths converging on Winchester, including the South Downs Way, Clarendon Way, King's Way, Pilgrims' Trail, St. Swithun's Way and Three Castles Path. The Monarch's Way crosses at Shawford.

== Waymarking ==
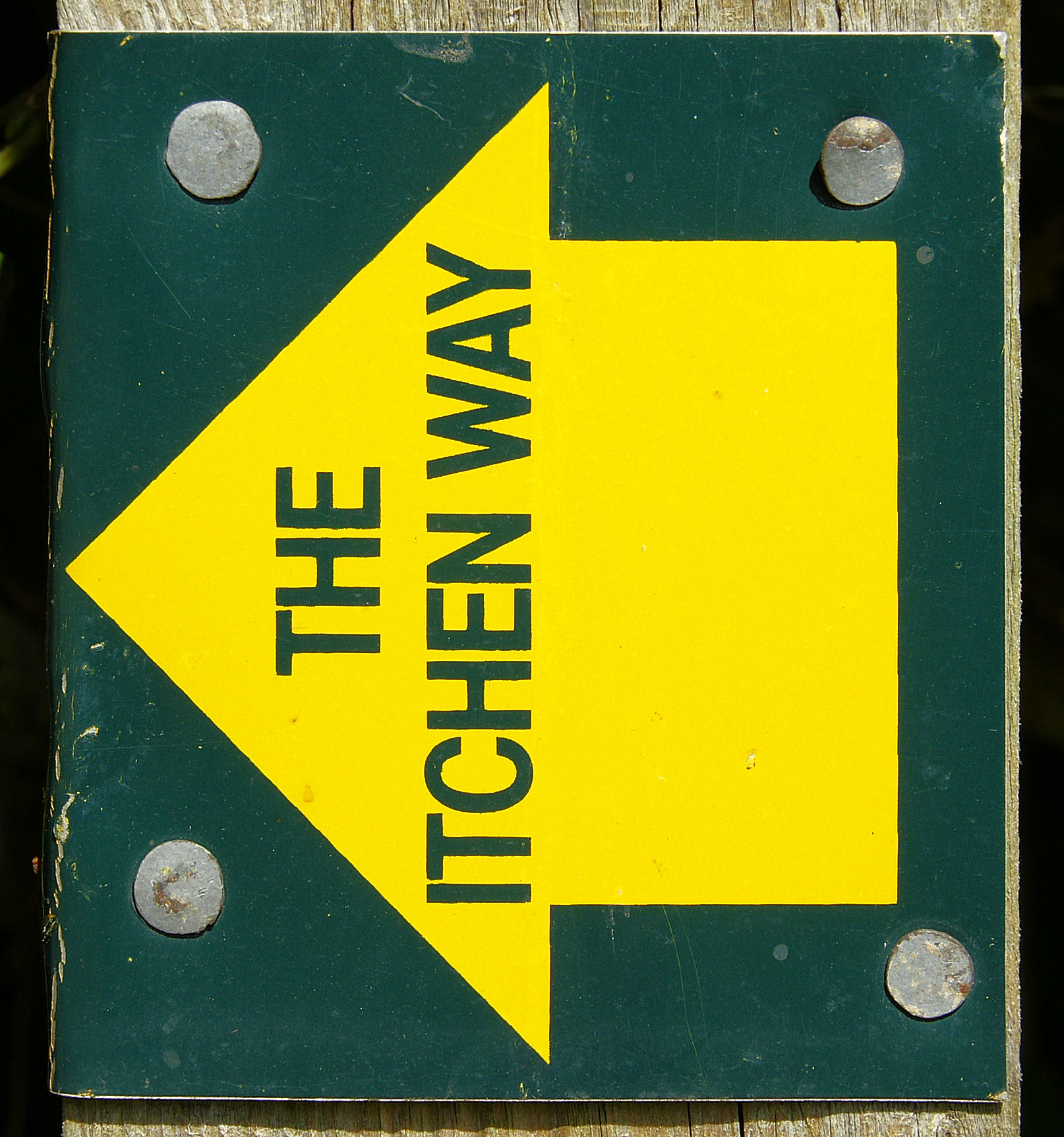
A waymark near Cheriton

The footpath is waymarked by metal disks attached to wooden posts and adhesive stickers and these show a yellow arrow on a dark green background and the words The Itchen Way in the yellow arrow. Between these waymarks there are intermediate standard footpath waymarks bearing the Hampshire County Council logo. There is only limited waymarking in the urban area of Winchester. In Southampton it is waymarked by adhesive stickers on street furniture with the approval of Southampton City Council.

== Points of interest ==
The path crosses a variety of rural and urban landscapes. These include watercress beds and water meadows along the upper river, the historic centre of Winchester and the Iron-Age fort of St Catherine's Hill. Along other parts of the route are remains of the Didcot, Newbury and Southampton Railway including Hockley Railway Viaduct, and former locks on the Navigation. Landmarks further south include Southampton Airport and the Itchen toll Bridge. At the southern end are views of Southampton Docks and the Solent and Isle of Wight.

== Transport links ==
The southern starting point is Sholing station. Villages along the route between New Cheriton and Winchester are served by the 67 bus to Winchester and Petersfield, both of which have main line stations; service 64 also links New Alresford to Winchester and Alton. There are also stations close to the route at Bitterne, Eastleigh and Shawford.

== See also ==
- Long-distance footpaths in the UK
