= Upham, Hampshire =

Village and parish in Hampshire, England

Coordinates: 50.97866°N 1.24282°W

Upham
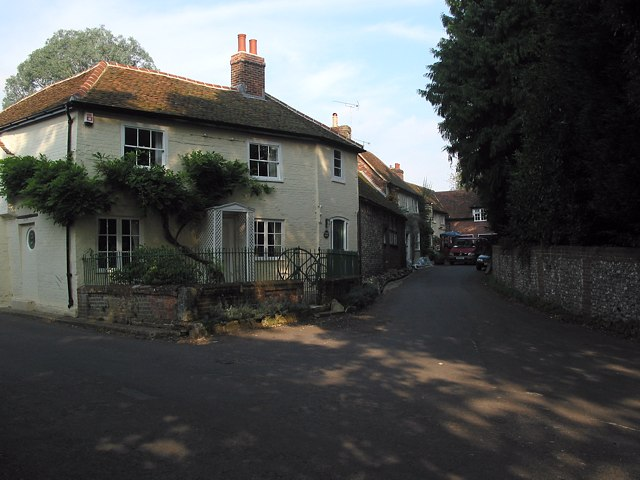
- Southeastern corner of Upham triangle

- Location within Hampshire
- Population: 772 (2021 census)
- OS grid reference: SU531202
- Civil parish: Upham
- District: City of Winchester
- Shire county: Hampshire
- Region: South East
- Country: England
- Sovereign state: United Kingdom
- Post town: Southampton
- Postcode district: SO32
- Dialling code: 01489
- Police: Hampshire and Isle of Wight
- Fire: Hampshire and Isle of Wight
- Ambulance: South Central
- UK Parliament: Winchester
- Website: Upham Parish Council

Upham is a small village and civil parish in Hampshire, England, approximately 7 miles (11 km) south-east of Winchester.

There is a small post office and a local primary school. The village is divided into two parts: Upham, centred on the church to the north, and Lower Upham, centred on the post office and main road. There are two pubs, the Brushmakers Arms and the Alma Inn, named after the Battle of Alma. Other features include a village pond, New Millennium Village Hall and a small private airfield that is the home of Solent Flight flying school.

== History ==
There are marginal remains of a late Roman period villa in nearby Little Woodcotte, found in 1849.

The Holt is a grade II listed country house which was the seat of the Shendley-Leavett family. John Alfred Leavett-Shendley, High Sheriff of Hampshire in 1985–1986, married Alison Yvonne Cecil, daughter of Yvonne Cornwallis and Henry Mitford Amherst Cecil, who served as a Royal Navy commander in both World Wars. It was also the home of Robert Calder, a naval officer in the Napoleonic Wars, who died there in 1815. Calder is buried in the local churchyard.

== Geography ==
Upham lies on the northern margin of the Paleogene deposits of the Hampshire Basin. The north of the parish is on chalk with the Lambeth Group and London Clay to the south.

== Governance ==
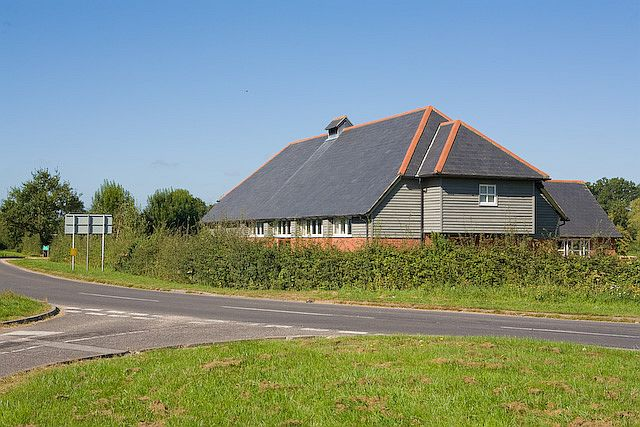
The village hall at Lower Upham

At the lowest tier of local government, Upham is a civil parish with a parish council of six elected councillors.

At the middle tier, Upham is in the City of Winchester non-metropolitan district. For elections to Winchester City Council it is in Upper Meon Valley electoral ward.

At the upper tier, Upham is in Hampshire non-metropolitan county. For elections to Hampshire County Council it is in Bishops Waltham electoral division.

== Demographics ==
Census population of Upham parish
| Census | Population | Female | Male | Households | Source |
|---|---|---|---|---|---|
| 2001 | 616 | 322 | 294 | 252 | |
| 2011 | 663 | 318 | 345 | 256 | |
| 2021 | 772 | 376 | 396 | 290 | |

== Transport ==
Lower Upham is crossed by the B2177 road, formerly the A333 Winchester to Portsmouth road; there are no other main roads in the parish. There is a regular bus service to Winchester, Twyford, Colden Common, Bishop's Waltham and Fareham.

The parish is crossed by many trackways and paths including the Monarch's Way, Pilgrims' Trail and King's Way. In the south of the parish King's Way and the Pilgrims' Trail partly use the course of the former Roman road from Winchester to Portchester, which passes between Upham and Lower Upham.
