= Soberton and Newtown Millennium Walk 2000 =

Path in Hampshire, England

Coordinates: 50.899°N 1.104°W

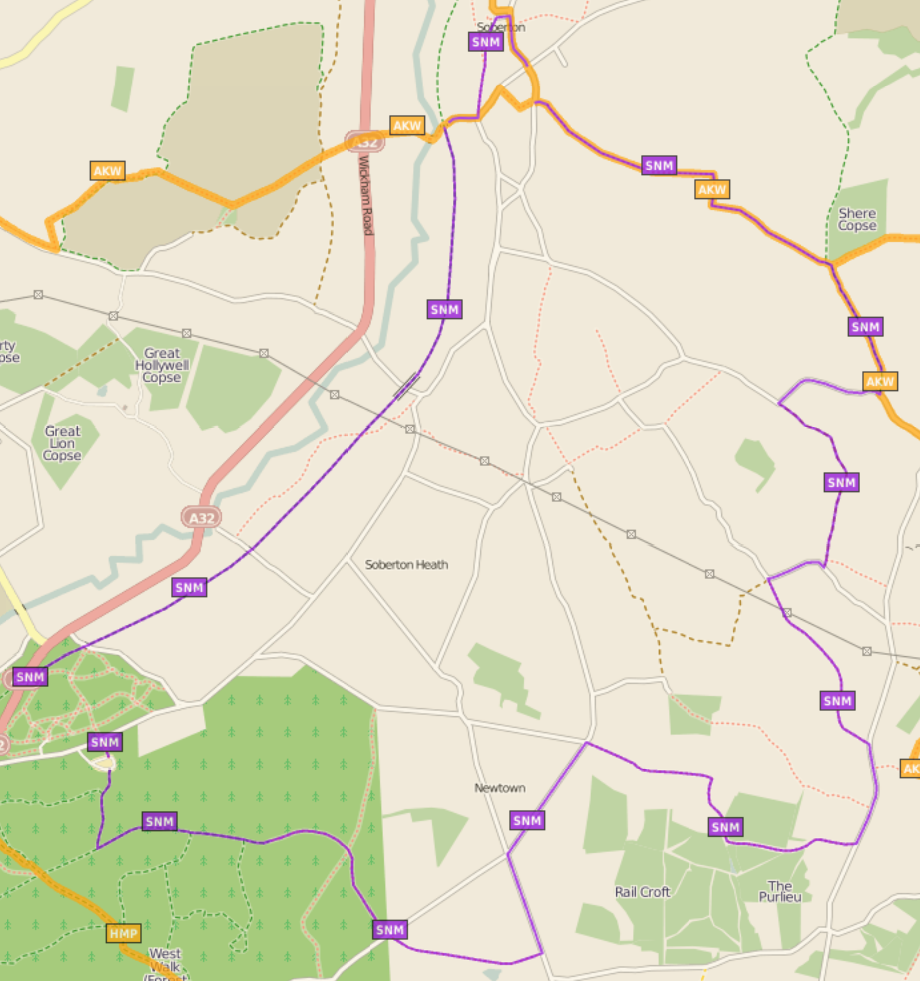
Map showing footpath and nearby major roads.

The Soberton and Newtown Millennium Walk 2000 is a 10-mile circular footpath through Hampshire, England around villages of Soberton and Newtown.

Sections of the footpath are shared with The King's Way, Pilgrims' Trail, Wayfarers Walk and Meon Valley Trail.

The entire route is waymarked by metal and plastic disks found attached to wooden and metal posts, trees and street furniture.

== See also ==
- Recreational walks in Hampshire
- Long-distance footpaths in the UK
