= South Downs Way =

Long-distance footpath in the south of England

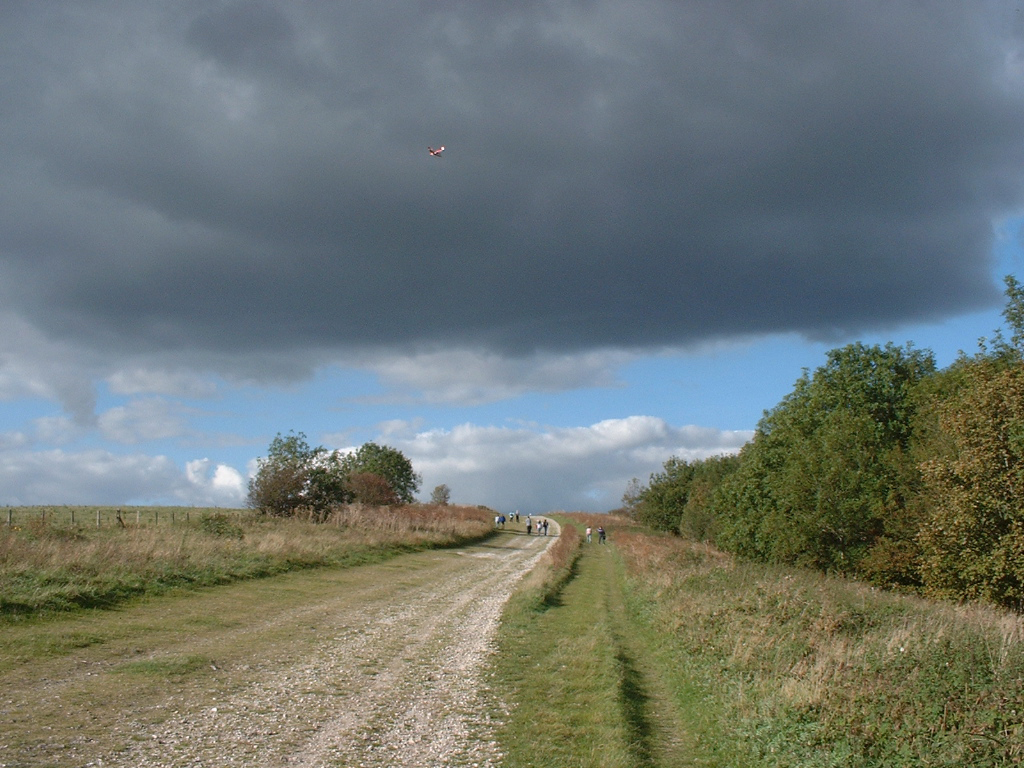
- South Downs Way, looking towards Chanctonbury Ring
- Length: 161 km (100 mi)
- Location: South Eastern England, United Kingdom
- Designation: UK National Trail
- Trailheads: Winchester Hampshire; 51.063°N 1.307°W; Eastbourne, East Sussex; 50.751°N 0.269°E
- Use: Hiking, Cycling
- Elevation change: 4,150 m (13,620 ft)
- Highest point: Butser Hill, 270 m (890 ft)
- Difficulty: Easy
- Season: All year
- Sights: Long Man of Wilmington, Chanctonbury Ring

The South Downs Way is a long distance footpath and bridleway running along the South Downs in southern England. It is one of 16 National Trails in England and Wales. The trail runs for 160 km (100 mi) from Winchester in Hampshire to Eastbourne in East Sussex, with about 4,150 m (13,620 ft) of ascent and descent. In 2016, over 60,000 people passed a single trail point.

== History ==
People have been using the paths and tracks that have been linked to form the South Downs Way for approximately 8000 years. They were a safer and drier alternative to those in the wetter lowlands throughout the Mesolithic era. Early occupation in the area began 2000 years after that in the Neolithic era. Early inhabitants built tumuli in places on the hills and hill forts later, once tribal fighting became more common. Old Winchester Hill is an example of one of these hill forts along the path. The trail was probably used by the Romans, despite the fact that they built one of their roads across the path at Stane Street (Chichester), this use possibly evidenced by the existence of Bignor Roman Villa near Bury, nearby the path.

The South Downs Way was approved as a National Trail in March 1963 and opened in July 1972. It was the UK's fifth national trail to be established and its first long-distance bridleway. It initially ran almost entirely in Sussex, from Buriton, on the Hampshire–Sussex border, to Beachy Head, near Eastbourne. In 1987 it was decided to extend the route westwards through Hampshire to Winchester.

Of medieval historical interest, the village of Lomer, now only visible as a few small bumps in the ground, was most likely abandoned during the plague in the 14th century. The flat plain to the north of the South Downs Way, where it passes Lewes, is the site of the Battle of Lewes fought by Simon de Montfort, 6th Earl of Leicester and Henry III during the Second Barons' War.

Ditchling Beacon probably due to its height, had for centuries been used to warn local inhabitants of pending invasion. Again during the Tudor period the beacon was utilized to warn Queen Elizabeth I of the Spanish Armada which could be seen coming up the channel.

One particular oddity, The Long Man of Wilmington, can be found only a few metres off the path and down the hill as the path nears one end in Eastbourne. Recent study has shown that it was most likely created in the sixteenth or seventeenth century AD possibly posing more questions than it answers regarding its meaning. Yet still it attracts its fair share of Neo-Druidism and other pagan interest with rituals and festival held there commonly.

Another significant hill figure visible from the trail is the Litlington White Horse, located on the western slope of Hindover Hill near Alfriston. While the Long Man is of uncertain older origin, the White Horse is a 20th-century creation, first cut in 1924 and later recut by local residents in the 1990s. Managed by the National Trust, it serves as a prominent landmark for walkers navigating the Cuckmere Valley section of the Way. Unlike the Long Man, which is viewed from the path, the South Downs Way passes directly above the White Horse, offering a perspective of the figure's scale and the underlying chalk geology.

During the Second World War much of the south coast of England was fortified with pillboxes, tank obstacles and machine gun posts in anticipation of a Nazi invasion, the plan for which was known to the Nazis as Operation Sealion. These objects can be seen closer to the sea and require a diversion. The closest is Newhaven Fort, a 5-mile diversion from the path, which is an attraction that houses many World War II artefacts and documents with examples of the huge cannons used in coastal defence.

In 2016, a trail point recorded 61,191 passers-by.

In 2022, the South Downs Way celebrated 50 years since opening by fixing commemorative plaques to signposts along the way in all 66 parishes that the path runs through.

== Route ==
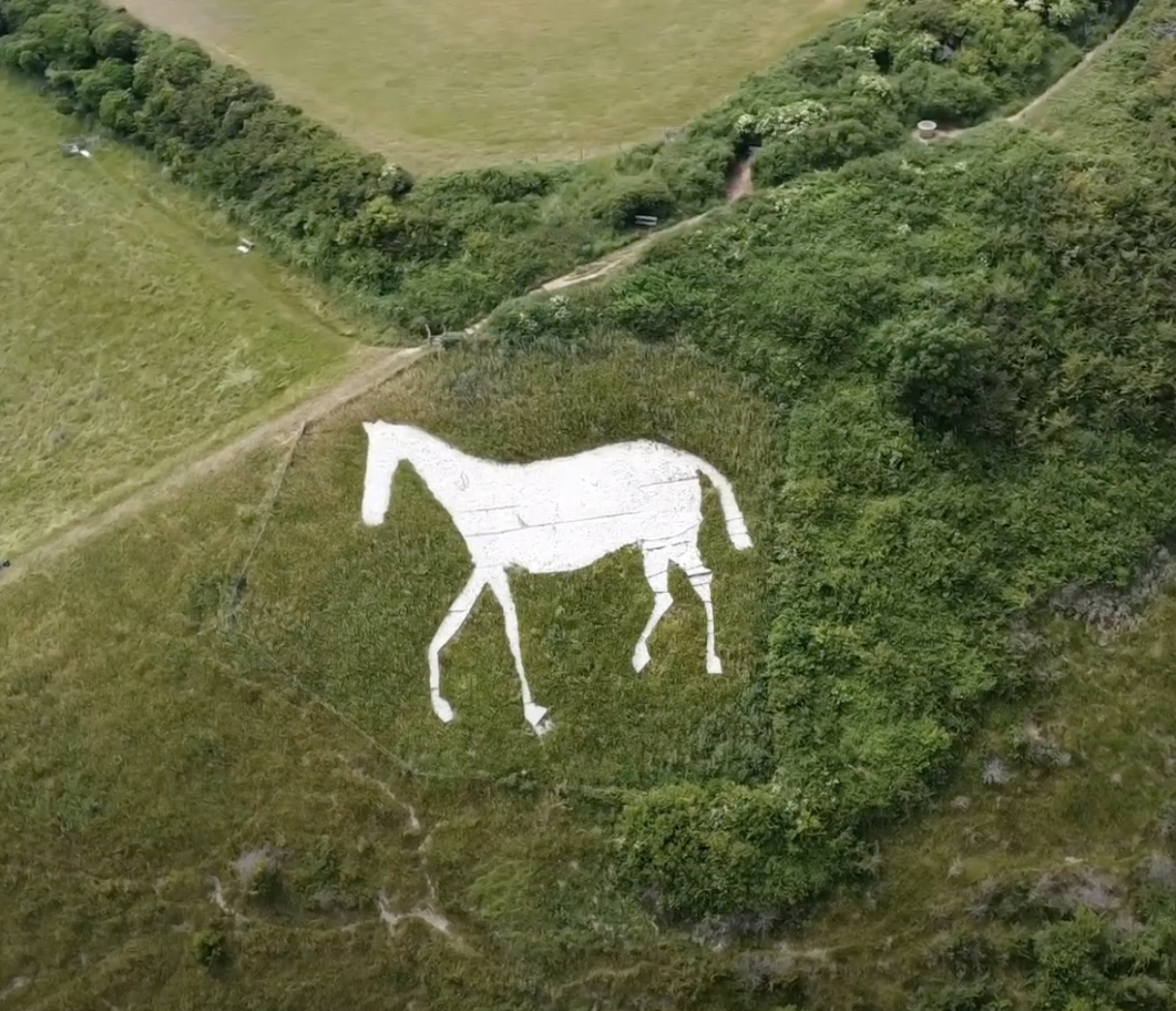
The Litlington White Horse, a 20th-century hill figure visible from the trail near Alfriston.

The undulating path begins in Winchester Hampshire, and passes Cheesefoot Head, the towns of Petersfield and Arundel, the villages of Storrington and Steyning, Devil's Dyke viewpoint near Brighton, followed by Ditchling Beacon and miles of chalk downland across to Beachy Head, and ending in Eastbourne, East Sussex. The trail is popular with walkers, including day walkers, overnighters, and through hikers.

Several youth hostels are along the route to accommodate walkers. It also passes Birling Gap, a beach area with hotel and restaurant.

Most of the route is on bridleways, permitting access for walkers, cyclists and horse riders. Occasional short sections are on roads or byways, and these are the only parts on which motor vehicles are permitted. Some sections are on footpath, and in these places an alternative signed route via road or bridleway is provided for cyclists. The footpath sections are mostly short, but between Alfriston and Eastbourne there is an extended footpath section including the Seven Sisters cliffs, for which the bridleway alternative is several miles inland.

== Geography ==
The South Downs Way lies within the South Downs National Park, mostly on high chalk downland of the Hampshire Downs and the South Downs. The easternmost section is on the high chalk cliffs of the Seven Sisters, Sussex. Apart from at the end points, the way keeps to relatively isolated rural areas and some villages, although it passes within a few miles of Brighton and Lewes.

== Endurance events ==
Various running and cycling events are held along the route; including the British Heart Foundation's annual randonée. Part or all of the 100 miles is cycled to raise funds for heart disease research, the fastest times are sub 8 hours with most riders taking under 14 hours.

Part of the South Downs Way is used for Oxfam's Trailwalker, the UK's 'toughest team charity challenge'. It is a non-stop 100 km endurance event along the South Downs Way to raise money for Oxfam and the Gurkha Welfare Trust.

Around 93% of the full 100 miles is run non-stop on foot as part of the 'Centurion South Downs Way 100'; course records are held by (male) Mark Darbyshire 13 hrs 42 mins, and (female) Lucy Gossage 16 hrs 30 mins.

== Connecting paths ==
=== International routes ===
For much of its length the South Downs Way forms part of the route of the E9 European Coastal Path which runs for 3,125 miles (5,000 km) from Cabo de São Vicente in south-west Portugal to Narva-Jõesuu in north-east Estonia, near the border with Russia.

The route runs through Portugal, Spain and France before crossing the English Channel by ferry from the French port of Roscoff to Plymouth. From Plymouth the route of the E9 follows the South West Coast Path, Bournemouth Coast Path, the Solent Way (with an Isle of Wight option) where it meets the South Downs Way at the Queen Elizabeth Country Park near Buriton. From Jevington the E9 route leaves the South Downs Way and follows the 1066 Country Walk and Saxon Shore Way to Dover, from where it returns to France. It then continues to Belgium, the Netherlands, Germany, Denmark, Poland, Lithuania, Latvia and Estonia.

As a National Trail, the South Downs Way is also part of the network of routes that form the International Appalachian Trail.

=== Other long-distance footpaths ===
The South Downs Way also connects with many other long-distance paths offering opportunities for longer expeditions:

- Clarendon Way, 26 miles (42 km) from Salisbury Cathedral to Winchester Cathedral (Hampshire and Wiltshire)
- Downs Link, 36.7 miles (59 km) from the North Downs Way at St Martha's Hill, Surrey, to the South Downs Way near Steyning, continuing via the Coastal Link to Shoreham-by-Sea (Surrey and West Sussex)
- Hangers Way, 21 miles (34 km) from Alton to Queen Elizabeth Country Park near Petersfield (Hampshire)
- Itchen Way, 31.8 miles (51 km) from Hinton Ampner House to Woolston (Hampshire)
- King's Way or the Allan King Way, 45 miles (72 km) from Portchester to Winchester (Hampshire)
- The Monarch's Way, 625 miles (1,006 km) from Worcester to Shoreham-by-Sea (Worcestershire, Shropshire, Staffordshire, Warwickshire, Gloucestershire, Somerset, Dorset, Wiltshire, Hampshire, West Sussex, East Sussex)
- The New Lipchis Way, 37.8 miles (61 km) from Liphook, Hampshire, to West Wittering, West Sussex (Hampshire and West Sussex)
- The Pilgrims' Trail, 155 miles (249 km) from Winchester Cathedral to the Mont Saint-Michel (Hampshire and Normandy)
- St Swithun's Way, 34 miles (55 km) from Winchester Cathedral to Farnham (Hampshire and Surrey)
- Staunton Way, 20.5 miles (33 km) circular walk connecting from Queen Elizabeth Country Park with Staunton Country Park (Hampshire)
- Sussex Border Path, 138 miles (222 km) from Thorney Island to Rye with the Mid Sussex spur, 33 miles (53 km) from Weir Wood Reservoir to Mile Oak (East and West Sussex, Hampshire, Surrey and Kent)
- Sussex Ouse Valley Way, 42 miles (68 km) from Lower Beeding to Seaford (East and West Sussex)
- Three Castles Path, 60 miles (97 km) from Winchester Great Hall, Hampshire, to Windsor Castle, Berkshire (Hampshire and Berkshire)
- Vanguard Way, 66.2 miles (107 km) from Croydon, London, to Newhaven, East Sussex (London, Surrey, Kent and East Sussex)
- Wayfarer's Walk, 71 miles (114 km) from Walbury Hill, Berkshire, to Emsworth, Hampshire (Berkshire and Hampshire)
- The Wealdway, 83 miles (134 km) from Gravesend, Kent, to Eastbourne, East Sussex (Kent and East Sussex)

== See also ==
- North Downs Way
- Long-distance footpaths
- List of long-distance footpaths in the United Kingdom
- Pilgrims' Way
- Sussex Border Path
- E9 European long distance path
- The Four Men: a Farrago

== Notes and references ==
- Millmore, Paul (2010), South Downs Way (National Trail Guides), London: Aurum Press, ISBN 978-1845135652. Route indicated using OS maps.
- OS Explorer Maps (1:25,000) OL8, OL10, OL11, OL25, OL32
- OS Landranger Maps (1:50,000) 185, 197, 198, 199
- Ravenscroft, Neil (1992), Recreation Planning and Development, Macmillan International Higher Education, p. 145, ISBN 9781349221974.
