= Itchen Navigation =

Disused canal system in Hampshire, England

- The disused Stoke lock, which now functions as a weir and sluice
- Interactive map of Itchen Navigation

Specifications
- Locks: 15 + 2 single gates
- Status: Limited restoration

History
- Original owner: Itchen Navigation Company
- Date of act: 1665
- Date of first use: 1710
- Date closed: 1869

Geography
- Start point: Winchester
- End point: Northam Quay

The Itchen Navigation is a 10.4-mile (16.7 km) disused canal system in Hampshire, England, that provided an important trading route from Winchester to the sea at Southampton for about 150 years. Improvements to the River Itchen were authorised by an act of Parliament in 1665, but progress was slow, and the navigation was not declared complete until 1710. It was known as a navigation because it was essentially an improved river, with the main river channel being used for some sections, and cuts with locks used to bypass the difficult sections. Its waters are fed from the River Itchen. It provided an important method of moving goods, particularly agricultural produce and coal, between the two cities and the intervening villages.

On its completion it was capable of taking shallow barges of around 13 feet (4.0 m) in width and 70 feet (21 m) in length, but traffic was fairly modest. 18,310 tons of freight were carried in 1802, one of the better years, and there were never more than six boats in use on the waterway. Following the opening of the London and Southampton Railway in 1840, traffic declined sharply, and the navigation ceased to operate in 1869. There were various attempts to revitalise it, but none were successful. There had also been several proposals to link it to the Basingstoke Canal to form an inland route from London to Southampton during its life, which likewise did not come to fruition.

The revival of interest in inland waterways following the end of the Second World War has resulted in the tow path alongside the canal becoming part of the Itchen Way long-distance footpath, and is a popular route for walkers. The Itchen Navigation Preservation Society was formed in the 1970s, but progress was slow. A joint venture between the Environment Agency and the Hampshire and Isle of Wight Wildlife Trust in 2005 led to the formation of the Itchen Navigation Trust, and two years later, they obtained a grant from the Heritage Lottery Fund, funding the creation of the Itchen Navigation Heritage Trail Project, which has sought to conserve and interpret the remains. The route provides habitat for a diverse flora and fauna, which has resulted in it being designated as a European Special Area of Conservation and a Site of Special Scientific Interest.

== History ==
The River Itchen had been commercially important since before Norman times, with a staithe for unloading boats recorded at Bishopstoke in 960, and stone for Winchester Cathedral, built when Winchester was the capital city of England, was probably transported by water from the quarries of Caen in France. The first recorded improvements to the river were made by Godfrey de Lucy, who was Bishop of Winchester between 1189 and 1204. He funded the works himself, and as a consequence, was granted the right to levy tolls on goods transported on the river by King John. There was considerable trade in wool and leather, but the centres for this moved to Calais and Melcombe Regis in 1353, and as the trade declined, so did the navigable parts of the river. It was noted to be in poor condition in 1452, and a report for the Commissioners of Sewers in 1617 suggested that much of it was obstructed by mills which had been built on the banks.

River Itching Navigation Act 1766
- Act of Parliament
- Parliament of Great Britain
- Long title: An Act to explain, amend, and render more effectual, an Act made in the Sixteenth and Seventeenth Years of King Charles the Second, intituled, "An Act for making divers Rivers navigable, or otherwise passable, for Boats, Barges, and other Vessels," so far as the same relates to the River Itching, running from Alresford, through Winchester, to the Sea near Southampton; and for better regulating the said Navigation.
- Citation: 7 Geo. 3. c. 87
- Territorial extent: Great Britain

Dates
- Royal assent: 15 April 1767
- Commencement: 17 December 1765 (Note: Start of session.)
Other legislation
Amended by	River Itchin Navigation Act 1795; River Itchin Navigation Act 1802; Itchin Navigation Rates Act 1820

Status: Amended

Text of statute as originally enacted

Construction of the canal was authorised by an act of Parliament, the River Navigation Act 1664 (16 & 17 Cha. 2. c. 13 Pr.). The act allowed a number of rivers to be made navigable, and in each case, undertakers were appointed, to carry out the work, as were commissioners, chosen from the local justices, who were responsible for confirming the tolls. The undertakers made very slow progress, and it was not until 1710 that the work was completed. They had built locks and some artificial cuts to bypass difficult sections of the river, and created a towing path for horses. The route was 10.4 miles (16.7 km) long, of which 2.75 miles (4.43 km) were new cuts, and although some of the rest used the course of the river, much of it followed secondary streams. New undertakers were not appointed as old ones died, and by 1767, the navigation was effectively owned by one man, a Mr Edward Pyott. Local people felt that he was exceeding his powers, and they obtained a second act of Parliament, the River Itching Navigation Act 1766 (7 Geo. 3. c. 87) in 1767, which noted that Pyott had created a trading and carrying monopoly, as he would refuse to carry coal and other goods which interfered with his own activities. The preamble to the act claimed that this was harming the poor and the inhabitants of Winchester.

The act was unusual, as it was obtained without Pyott's consent, and created a new group of commissioners from local justices and dignitaries. They were empowered to set the rates for tolls, and the owner was obliged to transport all goods at the established rates. If there were not sufficient boats and the owner did not provide more, they could license others to provide carriage services. They could also order that locks, wharves and warehouses should be erected. The size of boats was specified, and were to be capable of carrying between 20 and 30 tons of cargo. The tolls set were quite moderate, and a group of merchants appear to have leased the river from Pyott for a period after 1767, but he eventually took control again.

Some additional locks were added, and by 1795, there were fifteen, three made of masonry blocks, and twelve with turf sides. There were also two single gates or half locks. The lowest lock was at Woodmill, where the navigation joined the estuary of the River Itchen, on its way to Southampton Water. The main wharves at the Southampton end were at Northam, about 2 miles (3.2 km) below the lock, and barges worked down to them on the tide or were punted if the tide was rising. As the river was tidal below Woodmill Lock, the structure was rebuilt in 1829 with a third set of gates facing downstream, to prevent high tides flooding the navigation.

The route map shows the navigation in deep blue, (or green for the drained section), to distinguish it from the river, shown in light blue. Deep blue is normally used to represent navigable waterways, but is used here for clarity.

=== Operation ===
Following the death of Pyott, ownership of the navigation was bought by James D'Arcy, by then married to the widow of one of Pyott's sons. There were still mortgages of £4,666 outstanding, all of them owned by members of Pyott's family, on which interest had to be paid. He appears to have leased the tolls to the proprietors, according to a local newspaper report of the time, and then to Edward Knapp, before taking over again in 1794. Around 1802, the navigation was carrying 18,310 long tons (18,600 t) of freight, of which 10,300 long tons (10,500 t) were coal and culm, 350 long tons (360 t) were salt, 1,710 long tons (1,740 t) tons were chalk, and the remaining 5,950 long tons (6,050 t) tons were made up of other goods. The average annual income was quoted as £3,735, but this probably included freight charges as well as tolls, since D'Arcy managed both. He operated four barges.

River Itchin Navigation Act 1802
- Act of Parliament
- Parliament of the United Kingdom
- Long title: An Act for explaining, amending and rendering more effectual, several Acts of the Sixteenth and Seventeenth Years of the Reign of King Charles the Second, and of the Seventh and Thirty fifth Years of the Reign of His present Majesty, relating to the Navigation of the River Itchin, in the County of Southampton.
- Citation: 42 Geo. 3. c. cxi
- Territorial extent: United Kingdom

Dates
- Royal assent: 26 June 1802
- Commencement: 26 June 1802 (Note: The Acts of Parliament (Commencement) Act 1793.)
Other legislation
Amends	River Navigation Act 1664; River Itching Navigation Act 1766; River Itchin Navigation Act 1795
Amended by	Itchin Coal Rates Act 1811; Itchin Navigation Rates Act 1820

Status: Amended

Text of statute as originally enacted

With the prospects of a link between the navigation and the Basingstoke Canal being constructed, the undertaking was valued at £24,000, and D'Arcy sold a half share in it to his agent, George Hollis. He then sold the other half to him, and moved to Ireland. Hollis became the sole proprietor from 1804, having bought out his sleeping partner. Throughout its life, the navigation had almost been a monopoly, but Hollis planned to end this, and obtained the River Itchin Navigation Act 1802 (42 Geo. 3. c. cxi), to make it an open navigation, where anyone could use it on payment of the appropriate tolls. These were laid down in the act of Parliament, ending the setting of tolls by the commissioners. The act also specified that he had three years to put the river in order, which he appears to have achieved, since he then leased it to a group of merchants.

Itchin Coal Rates Act 1811
- Act of Parliament
- Parliament of the United Kingdom
- Long title: An Act for increasing the Rates on Coals conveyed on the River Itchin, in the County of Southampton; and for amending and rendering more effectual the several Acts relating thereto.
- Citation: 51 Geo. 3. c. ccii
- Territorial extent: United Kingdom

Dates
- Royal assent: 26 June 1811
- Commencement: 26 June 1811
Other legislation
Amends	River Itchin Navigation Act 1795; River Itchin Navigation Act 1802
Amended by	Itchin Navigation Rates Act 1820

Status: Amended

Text of statute as originally enacted

Itchin Navigation Rates Act 1820
- Act of Parliament
- Parliament of the United Kingdom
- Long title: An Act for increasing the Rates on Goods and Commodities conveyed on the River Itchin, in the County of Southampton.
- Citation: 1 Geo. 4. c. lxxv
- Territorial extent: United Kingdom

Dates
- Royal assent: 15 July 1820
- Commencement: 15 July 1820
Other legislation
Amends	River Itching Navigation Act 1766; River Itchin Navigation Act 1802; Itchin Coal Rates Act 1811

Status: Current legislation

Text of statute as originally enacted

From 1808, a number of detractors argued that the navigation was in a poor condition, hoping to force Hollis to concede water rights to mills, and traffic declined. Another act of Parliament, the Itchin Coal Rates Act 1811 (51 Geo. 3. c. ccii), allowed Hollis to raise the tolls, and eight years later, he held a meeting at the Winchester Guildhall, explaining why he needed to raise the tolls further. The meeting asked him to postpone his next bill for a year, in return for which they would give him £1,200 for one year's tolls, wharfage and rent, he would spend £600 on repairs, and the remaining £600 would amount to 5 per cent interest on the estimated value of the navigation, which was then £12,000. He obtained the Itchin Navigation Rates Act 1820 (1 Geo. 4. c. lxxv) a year later, which raised the tolls, but the commissioners reduced freight charges at the same time, resulting in the operation being more profitable for Hollis and less so for the barge owners.

=== Decline ===
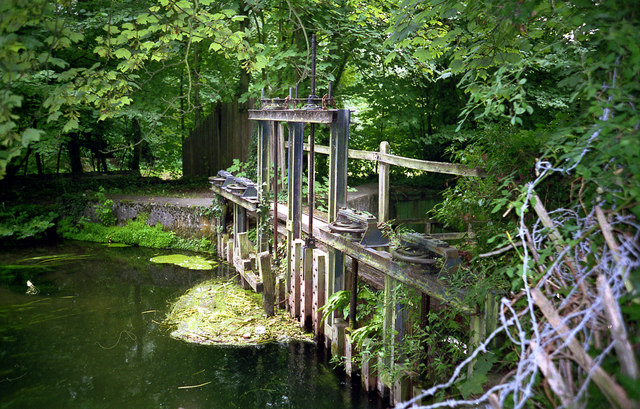
Remains of Brambridge Lock

Hollis raised mortgages to pay for improvements, but receipts were down to £1,821 in 1839, the last full year of operation before the London and Southampton Railway opened. The receipts were obtained from tolls, as all freight was moved by independent carriers. At this point, Hollis gave control of the navigation to members of his family. His son managed it until 1841, when a banker called W. W. Bulpett, who was a mortgagee, took over. In 1847 he was given notice to quit by the Hollis family, despite having done a good job, but he refused. F. W. Hollis eventually obtained most of the shares from the other family members, and started legal action to remove Bulpett. Railway competition had caused a sharp drop in receipts, from £1,012 in 1843 to £430 in 1861, and payments to shareholders and mortgagees ceased in 1850 and 1857. In 1863, Bulpett was replaced by Mr Clarke, formerly the manager of the Andover Canal, but Bulpett returned when he won the action brought by Hollis.

However, his re-instatement was short lived, as the navigation ceased to operate in January 1869, the last month in which tolls were collected. Mortgages of £19,708 were outstanding, of which £2,607 dated from the original construction by Pyott. A plan to buy the waterway by J. R. Stebbings of Southampton in 1871 fell through. A further attempt to buy the navigation was made in 1909 by Patrick O'Carroll, an estate agent from Southsea. He created a company called the Itchen Navigation Ltd, with a capital of £20,000, but they were unable to establish who owned it, and so the company never traded.

=== Extensions ===
During the life of the canal, there were several proposals to link the canal to the Basingstoke Canal, to provide an inland route between London and Southampton. The first was in 1788, and was initiated by the Basingstoke Canal Company, six months after they started work on their main line. A survey for a proposed route was made, but no further progress occurred.

The Basingstoke committee then investigated a link to the Andover Canal, but in December 1792, interest switched back to a link with the Itchen. A meeting was held in Southampton, which was chaired by the mayor and included James D'Arcy on the committee. It became part of a much grander scheme to link Bristol to Salisbury, and onwards to London, but although most of this soon died away, the Itchen to Basingstoke link was still being considered in 1796, by which time it was called the London and Southampton Ports Junction Canal. Two routes were surveyed by different engineers, one costing £127,000 and the other £157,566.

The main focus was on providing a safe route between London and Southampton, in view of the war with France at the time and the threat to shipping using a coastal route. However, prices were rising, and there were a number of other canal schemes in difficulty at the time, which resulted in it being put on hold until 1807. Meanwhile, the Grand Surrey Canal was being proposed in 1800, and Ralph Dodd the main promoter suggested that it could easily be extended to join the Itchen. The previous scheme received more attention in 1807, by which time it had become the Portsmouth, Southampton and London Junction Canal. From Winchester it would pass through Alresford, Alton and Farnham, to join either the Basingstoke Canal at Aldershot or the Wey and Godalming Navigations at Godalming. To speed construction, it was suggested that the 2-mile (3.2 km) summit tunnel could be replaced by a 7-mile (11 km) railway, with the tunnel being built in due course.

Widely divergent costs for the project were discussed. The original estimate was £140,000 if the railway was built, and £200,000 if the tunnel was built. Opponents suggested the cost would be nearer £700,000, and John Rennie estimated the tunnel line would cost £440,790 in 1809. Opponents argued that the real intent was to improve the water supply for the Basingstoke Canal or to line the pockets of George Hollis, the owner of the Itchen Navigation. There was considerable interest in the scheme, as 1,244 shares of £100 had been subscribed by early 1809, but with opposition from land and mill owners, and Rennie's report indicating much higher costs, the project was dropped.

One final proposal was made in 1902. Experiments had been carried out on the Wey and Godalming using electric traction to pull the barges. The scheme was for a 64-mile (103 km) canal from Ditton on the River Thames through Guildford, Godalming and Alton to join the Itchen at Winchester. 250-ton barges would be pulled along from the towpath by engines fed from overhead catenary wires. However, although such a system was operational in France, nothing came of the proposal.

=== Closure ===
Although the navigation ceased to operate from January 1869, Woodmill Lock remained in use, to enable barges to reach Gaters Mill at West End, which was on the main river channel just above the start of the first cut. Most of the bridges over the navigation were owned by the navigation, and their condition deteriorated. The manager, Mr Bulpett, was notified that he had 21 days to repair Shawford Bridge in 1879. He replied to the Winchester Highway Board that the navigation was insolvent, and he would help them to transfer responsibility for it to the county council. The board carried out temporary repairs, when Bulpett agreed that the navigation would meet the full cost of repairing it properly if it ever reopened. The following year, Bulpett was threatened with legal action over the state of Bishopstoke Bridge, but at this point it was agreed that the navigation had no income, and could not be sold, and so the county would have to maintain the bridges.

In 1911, a Mr Bowker from Shawford successfully applied for the towpath to be diverted, but this was overturned when Rev. J. H. Du Boulay appealed against the decision. The diversion was sanctioned in 1914, although there have been doubts about the legality of the action, and subsequently two further diversions were made, at Chickenhall, near the southern end and at Hockley, near the northern end. No maintenance was carried out on the waterway until the formation of catchment boards. Thus responsibility for the waterway as a drainage channel passed to the Hampshire Catchment Board in 1942, and some work was carried out to maintain the integrity of the waterway. These responsibilities later passed to the Southern Water Authority, and now reside with the Environment Agency.

In the 1960s, the value of the towpath as a leisure amenity began to be recognised. The deputy county clerk for Hampshire walked along the towpath from end to end in 1966, together with members of the Ramblers Association. He decided that rather than challenge the legality of the towpath diversions, he would invite the local authorities through which the navigation ran to assume responsibility for maintaining the towpath. These organisations were Southampton County Borough Council, Eastleigh Borough Council, Winchester Rural District Council and Winchester City Council. The construction of weirs at most of the locks by the Southern Water Authority resulted in water levels being restored on significant parts of the navigation.

=== Legislation ===
River Itchin Navigation Act 1795
- Act of Parliament
- Parliament of Great Britain
- Long title: An Act to explain, amend and render more effectual the several Acts, of the sixteenth and seventeenth of King Charles the Second, and of the seventh of His present Majesty, relating to the Navigation of the River Itchin in the County of Southampton, and for improving the Navigation thereof, and for ascertaining the Rates of Carriage, Riverage and Wharsage payable thereon.
- Citation: 35 Geo. 3. c. 86
- Territorial extent: Great Britain

Dates
- Royal assent: 2 June 1795
- Commencement: 2 June 1795
Other legislation
Amends	River Navigation Act 1664; River Itching Navigation Act 1766
Amended by	Itchin Coal Rates Act 1811

Status: Amended

Text of statute as originally enacted

The powers of the navigation were enshrined in several acts of Parliament: the River Navigation Act 1664 (16 & 17 Cha. 2. c. 13 Pr.), the River Itching Navigation Act 1766 (7 Geo. 3. c. 87), the River Itchin Navigation Act 1795 (35 Geo. 3. c. 86), the River Itchin Navigation Act 1802 (42 Geo. 3. c. cxi), the Itchin Coal Rates Act 1811 (51 Geo. 3. c. ccii) and the Itchin Navigation Rates Act 1820 (1 Geo. 4. c. lxxv), none of which have been repealed.

=== Restoration ===
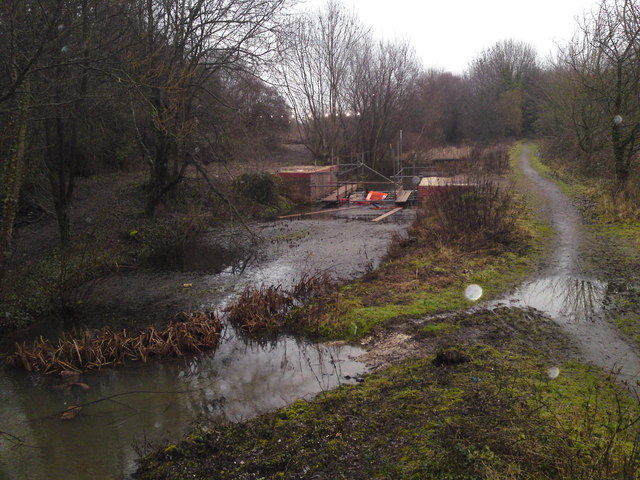
Lock conservation work in progress at Mansbridge Lock

The newer technologies of road and rail led to the navigation falling into disuse. Some lengths of the system were drained or allowed to overgrow with vegetation. Increasingly the difference between the canal and the river became less obvious, although it is still possible to identify remains of the original locks. The threat to the remains which the construction of the M3 motorway posed spurred the Winchester Tenants and Residents Association and the local branch of the Inland Waterways Association into action in 1975, with both suggesting that the waterway could be restored. The two groups later co-operated, and the Itchen Navigation Preservation Society was formed.

Little progress was made, but in 2005 the Environment Agency and the Hampshire and Isle of Wight Wildlife Trust promoted the formation of the Itchen Navigation Trust. They were committed to conserving the remains, rather than a full restoration to navigable standards. A request was made to the Heritage Lottery Fund in the United Kingdom for funds to restore the watercourse. Known as The Itchen Navigation Heritage Trail Project, funding was granted and a five-year restoration project began. Work has included widening the aperture at College Mead Lock and the construction of a bypass channel around Malm Lock to assist the movement of fish and other aquatic fauna. The navigation has been designated a European Special Area of Conservation as well as a Site of Special Scientific Interest, due to the rich diversity of wildlife found along the system, and its historical importance.

== Route ==
The official head of the canal was at Blackbridge Wharf, Winchester, just to the south of Wharf Mill, a grade II listed water mill dating from 1885, and College Walk, which spans the river at Blackbridge, an eighteenth-century stone bridge which is also grade II listed. Below the bridge, the channel splits, with the river flowing to the west and the navigation to the east. Blackbridge Wharf was accessed by Wharf Bridge, the oldest surviving bridge over the navigation, dating from the 1760s. Close by, the manager's house, a warehouse and some stables have also survived. The navigation flows past the grounds of Winchester College, and under Tun Bridge, which carries Garnier Road, before continuing to the remains of St Catherine's Hill Lock, some 1.5 kilometres (0.93 mi) downstream of Blackbridge Wharf. This lock, which now contains a modern sluice mechanism, was the location of a water-powered sawmill, located to the west of the lock. Winchester College now uses the stretch of the navigation, between their club premises at the head of navigation and a winding hole just above the lock, for rowing practice.

The navigation passes St Catherine's Hill, an Iron Age hillfort and some plague pits, which were common graves for victims of the 1666 plague. It then passes under the former Didcot, Newbury and Southampton Railway, whose line from Winchester to Shawford Junction was operational between 1891 and 1966, before being diverted through a culvert under junction 11 of the M3 motorway. Originally this was the site of a bridge which carried the road from Winchester to Botley, but this was replaced by a full headroom concrete tunnel in the late 1930s, when the junction between that road and the new Winchester Bypass was built over the navigation. When the M3 motorway was constructed, following almost the same line as the bypass where it crossed the navigation, the tunnel was reduced to a culvert, although the original plans for the motorway would have destroyed most of the top pound. The building of the M3 across Twyford Down, a small area of ancient chalk downland, was controversial at the time, but the removal of the Winchester Bypass which ran to the west of St Catherine's Hill close to the navigation and its conversion back to grassland has brought tranquility back to the valley. The canal is on the western edge of Twyford Down, and continues through Twyford Lane End Lock before it briefly rejoins the river. Some 220 yards (200 m) south of the junction are Tumbling Bay Hatches, originally used to control levels in the water meadows to the east of the river. A modern sluice was installed just to the north of the 19th century hatches in 1971, and controls flow to the Twyford Drain, the main channel to the east of the navigation, which follows the river channel almost to Shawford Bridge. Modern maps, however, label the drain as the River Itchen.

A leat from this stretch was created at around the time of the construction of the canal to provide water for the Twyford Mead water meadows. Farming of the water meadows continued until around 1930, after the closure of the navigation itself. It was a labour-intensive method of land management, but the controlled flooding of the meadows, with the deposition of silt from the water, enabled the land to produce two crops of hay per year, as well as grazing for sheep and cattle. Demonstrations of the techniques used to flood the meadows are still carried out occasionally.

=== Below Twyford ===
The next lock is Compton Lock, the only one built on a river section. It is also called Compton Place Lock or Twyford Lock, and the extra flow compared to other locks may explain the erosion that has taken place, resulting in a circular area of water between the upper and lower gates. Just above Shawford Bridge, the river and navigation diverged, with Shawford Mill just below the junction. The building still stands. The bridge is a modern construction, and is located at a point where the towpath crosses to the western bank. Just to the south is a weir at the site of Shawford Single Gates, which probably ensured the mill had an adequate head of water. The village of Twyford lies to the east, and the Twyford Drain splits, with the western channel rejoining the river below the mill, and the eastern channel continuing as a relief channel. There are two more locks on the navigation, called Malm Lock and College Mead Lock, before the navigation rejoins the river. By the junction is the intake for Otterbourne Water Treatment Works.

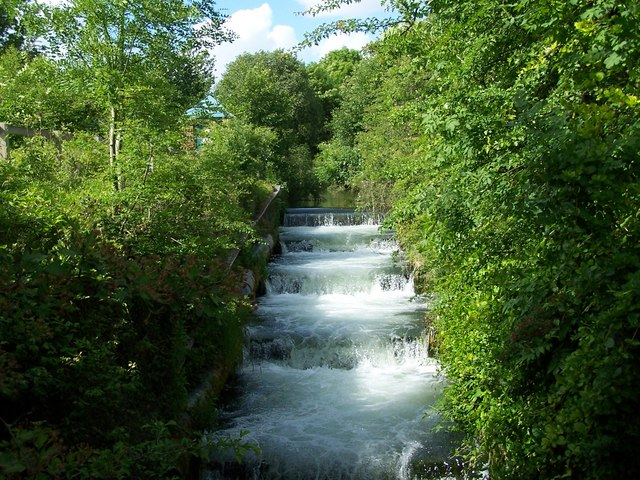
Remains of Allbrook Lock on the former Itchen Navigation

After some 450 yards (410 m), the river continues straight ahead, and another cut begins, turning sharply to the right. Soon the remains of Brambridge Lock are reached, which include a derelict eel trap. The design of the gates, which included vents near the top of the structure, to allow surplus water to pass through, was clearly shown in a drawing dating from 1880. Below it were Brambridge Single Gates, probably used to maintain water levels for a mill, of which some brickwork remains. There were hatches to allow water to return to the river channel either side of the gates, one of which is now a modern sluice. The navigation runs along an embankment for about 450 yards (410 m), which is 5 feet (1.5 m) high, before it reaches Allbrook Lock. This was moved in 1838, when the railway line was built, and was repaired in 1944. It has a chamber built of bricks, whereas the other locks are turf-sided. A bridge carries the B3335 over the tail of the lock, having been widened since it was first built. At the head of the lock is a gauging station, where the Environment Agency measure the flow and level of the water.

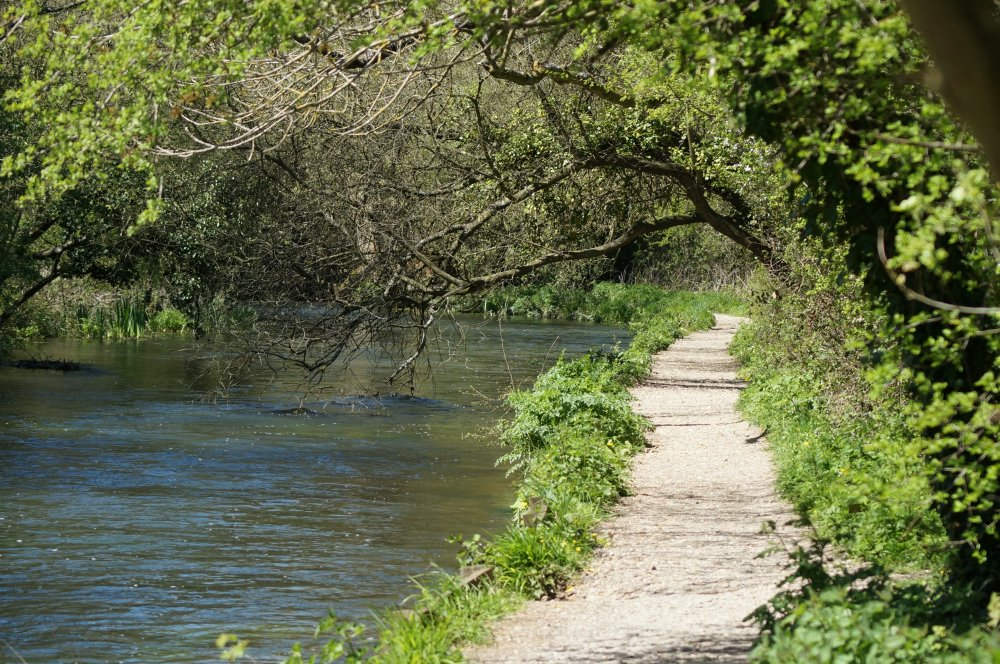
The Itchen Navigation below Withymead Lock, showing the footpath

The navigation turns to the west, passing under the railway line, and then loops back to return to the eastern side of the railway. It runs along the northern edge of some railway sidings which form part of Eastleigh Works, to reach Withymead Lock. This was unusual, as it included a bypass channel to take excess water around the lock, whereas the other locks used vents in the gates. Just below the lock, the navigation rejoins the river channel. At Barton Bay, the Barton River leaves the navigation, following a course to the west of the channel. A horse bridge carried the towpath over the river, which used to supply water to Barton Peveril Mill. The next cut began a little further south, with Bishopstoke or Stoke Lock at the head of it. There are four bridges on Bishopstoke Road, as it crosses the Barton River, the navigation, the river channel and the tailrace of Shears Mill, Bishopstoke. The mill was a large four-storey building, which was demolished in the 1920s. Four years before demolition, two water turbines of 20-inch (51 cm) and 36-inch (91 cm) diameter were installed, and were retained after the demise of the mill, in the hope that they could be used to generate DC power for the village. Several community groups were looking at the possibility of restoring the water turbines to generate electricity.

The next lock is Conegar Lock, which was also called Stoke Conegar or Coneygear Lock. Just above it are some hatches which supplied water to the adjacent water meadows. They were built of dressed stone, and are the best-preserved of the original hatches. There is no modern sluice at Conegar Lock, and the change in level has resulted in fast-flowing rapids which have cut back the channel above the lock. A little further south at Fish House Bay, the navigation crossed the Barton River diagonally, as the mill stream made its way back to the main river. A footbridge on the eastern bank carried the towpath over the Barton River, but the navigation below this point is dry, with its line occupied by a vegetable garden.

=== Below Conegar ===
The next section is the least preserved part of the navigation, which skirted to the east of Eastleigh Sewage Treatment Works, to a point where it was crossed by the railway from Eastleigh to Gosport. Two lengths have been filled in, and although there is a footpath, it follows the approximate route of the navigation, rather than the actual towpath. The railway bridge was built in 1841 and originally had two arches, one for the navigation, and another for the landowners. Replacement was necessary in 1979, and the bridge was demolished. Part of it was replaced by an embankment, but a large-diameter concrete tube was provided, or sufficient size to carry the navigation should it be reinstated. The next lock is Lock House Lock, which was also called Chickenhall Lock. The name reflects the fact that there was a lock-keeper's cottage by the structure, but this has long since disappeared.

The navigation then passes to the east of Southampton Airport, while further east is the river channel and the Itchen Valley Country Park. Between the two waterways is Decoy Covert, a small wood which contained a duck decoy. The lock nearby is called Decoy Pond Lock, below which is Sandy Lock. There is little water in this section, since its main supply has been cut off, and although there are springs along this section, the channel is periodically blocked where occupation bridges have been replaced by earth embankments. Sandy Lock has much barbed wire in it, possibly dumped when the wartime defences of the airport were dismantled. The final lock on this section is Mans Bridge Lock, shortly after the modern crossing by the M27 motorway. The cut then rejoins the main river, and passes under the A27 road. The current bridge was constructed in 1975, and replaced a bailey bridge erected during the Second World War. Just below it is a single arched stone bridge dating from the early nineteenth century, which was the original course of the road. It has been restored and is used as a footbridge.

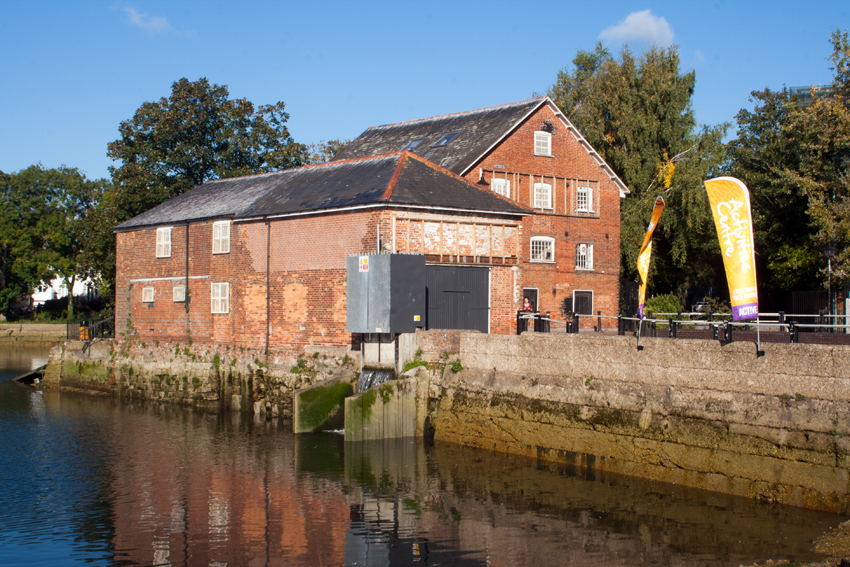
Woodmill, situated at the limit of the tidal Itchen

The final lock was the sea lock at Woodmill. There are no visible remains of it, although its location can still be seen. The mill was to the west, and now forms part of the Woodmill Outdoor Activities Centre, with the main building used as a canoe shop. The centre was set up in the late 1960s, and is a registered charity. The navigation officially continued downstream to a wharf at Northam, and although there was never a towpath on the tidal section, the Itchen Way long-distance footpath follows the eastern bank of the river for most of the way. Nothing remains of Northam Quay, and the bridge has been rebuilt twice since the first construction of 1796, the last time in 1954. The river also passes under the A3035 Cobden Bridge, and a railway bridge built in 1866, with two sets of round iron columns supporting the structure over the main channel, which retains most of its original appearance and now forms part of the West Coastway Line.

== Flora and fauna ==
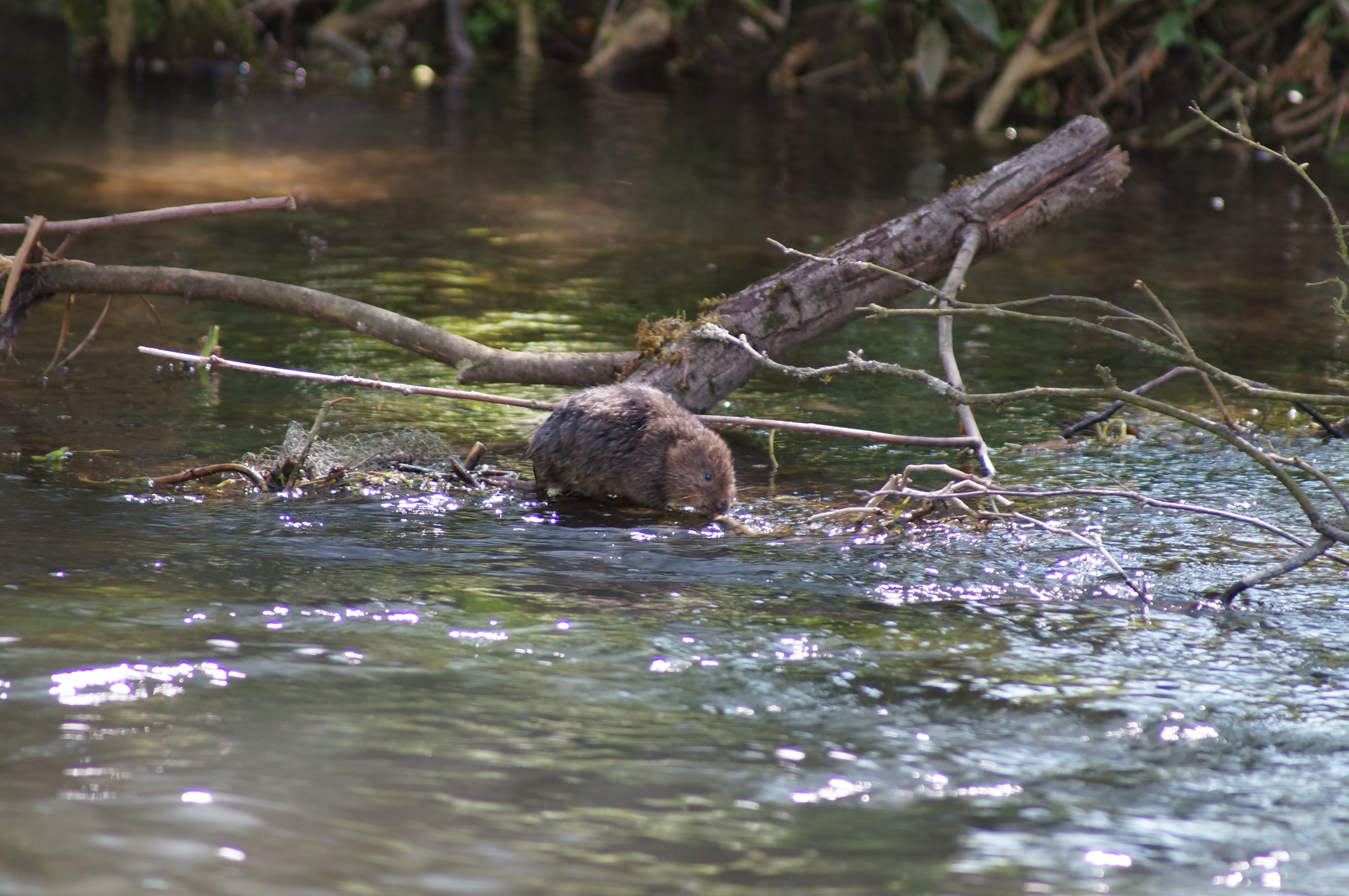
A water vole on the Itchen Navigation, between locks 9 and 10

The Itchen Navigation supports a rich flora and fauna, and one benefit of the 5-year grant-funded restoration project has been the regular monitoring and publishing of reports to document this. Annual reports on the populations of birds, bats, otters, water voles and butterflies, damselflies and dragonflies have been produced, with occasional reports on other aspects, while the Environment Agency has produces fisheries reports. As part of the project, a number of engineering works have been carried out to stabilise the banks, and trees have been cut back to reduce the amount of shade and encourage the growth of marginal vegetation. In the case of the water vole survey, this has been concentrated on the sections where work has been carried out, whereas the butterfly, damselfly and dragonfly survey has tended to cover the whole navigation. Vegetated berms containing marginal plants have been placed along the banks. The project has tried to avoid the installation of revetments, as the vertical faces prevent wildlife accessing the banks, but where a revetment is necessary to combat erosion, it has been built of oak and a berm placed in front of it to soften the edge.

In recognition of the fact that many people use the towpath to exercise their dogs, dog dips have been installed at Allbrook and Shawford. These provide easy access into the water for dogs, and owners are encouraged to only allow dogs to swim at these locations, to conserve the bank in other places. The water vole surveys have followed the best practice described in the Water Vole Conservation Handbook (2006), and have also recorded evidence of otter, brown rat and American mink populations. While carrying out the work, the surveyors have also counted sightings of kingfisher, grey heron, moorhen and coot. A bat survey carried out in 2008 recorded six of the 17 species common to the United Kingdom. Those recorded were common pipistrelle, soprano pipistrelle, Daubenton's, noctule, and serotine and brown long-eared bats. Eel surveys have been carried out on the navigation at two-yearly intervals since 2009. The 2017 survey showed a slight increase in the number of smaller eels detected, but overall the population is still at risk, having declined by around 60 percent since 2009, although there was a small increase since 2015, and the sizes of those measured were more variable, indicating that the population may be recovering. Most of the population is confined to the lower river, below Shawford. The surveys also record the other varieties of fish caught, which include brown trout, Atlantic salmon and grayling in significant numbers, with smaller quantities of gudgeon, roach, perch and pike. Brown trout inhabit most of the river, whereas the other species are mainly found in the lower river.

== Points of interest ==
Point	Coordinates (Links to map resources)	OS Grid Ref	Notes
Blackbridge Wharf	51.0561°N 1.3091°W	SU485287	Start of navigation
St Catherines Lock	51.0432°N 1.3157°W	SU480273	modern sluice
M3 motorway culvert	51.0377°N 1.3179°W	SU479267	tunnel under bypass from 1930s
Twyford Lane End Lock	51.0363°N 1.3175°W	SU479265	modern weir
Compton Lock	51.0272°N 1.3222°W	SU476255	modern weir
Shawford Single Gates	51.0220°N 1.3263°W	SU473249	
Malm Lock	51.0114°N 1.3300°W	SU471237	modern weir
College Mead Lock	51.0078°N 1.3313°W	SU470233	cascading weir
Brambridge Lock	51.0009°N 1.3342°W	SU468226	modern sluice
Brambridge Single Gates	50.9960°N 1.3381°W	SU465220	
Allbrook Lock	50.9875°N 1.3442°W	SU461211	Rebuilt 1838, 1944. Stepped weir
Withymead Lock	50.9797°N 1.3445°W	SU461202	built with bypass stream
Stoke Lock	50.9716°N 1.3405°W	SU464193	modern sluice
Coneger Lock	50.9673°N 1.3389°W	SU465188	
Lock House Lock	50.9546°N 1.3429°W	SU462174	
Decoy Pond Lock	50.9493°N 1.3530°W	SU455168	
Sandy Lock	50.9457°N 1.3544°W	SU454164	
M27 motorway crossing	50.9409°N 1.3607°W	SU450159	
Mansbridge Lock	50.9403°N 1.3616°W	SU449158	modern weir
A27 Mans Bridge	50.9376°N 1.3648°W	SU447155	
Woodmill Lock	50.9348°N 1.3765°W	SU439152	Destroyed
Northam Bridge	50.9147°N 1.3856°W	SU432129	Wharf and end of Navigation

== Bibliography ==
- Busst, Georgina (2017). "Solent and South Downs: Fish monitoring report 2017" (PDF). Environment Agency. Archived (PDF) from the original on 15 February 2021.
- Course, Edwin (2011). The Itchen Navigation. Hampshire Industrial Archaeology Society. ISBN 978-0-905280-10-3.
- Hadfield, Charles (1969). The Canals of South and South-East England. David and Charles. ISBN 0-7153-4693-8.
- Squires, Roger (2008). Britain's restored canals. Landmark Publishing. ISBN 978-1-84306-331-5.
- Wessex Archaeology (April 2005). Itchen Navigation Heritage Trail (PDF). Hampshire and Isle of Wight Wildlife Trust. Archived from the original (PDF) on 20 December 2020.
- Whyte, Polly (2012a). Itchen Navigation Water Vole Survey 2011 (PDF). Hampshire and Isle of Wight Wildlife Trust.
- Whyte, Polly; Morse, Ali (2009). "Itchen Navigation Bat Survey 2008" (PDF). Hampshire and Isle of Wight Wildlife Trust.
