= Owslebury =

Village and parish in Hampshire, England

Coordinates: 51.00759°N 1.266582°W

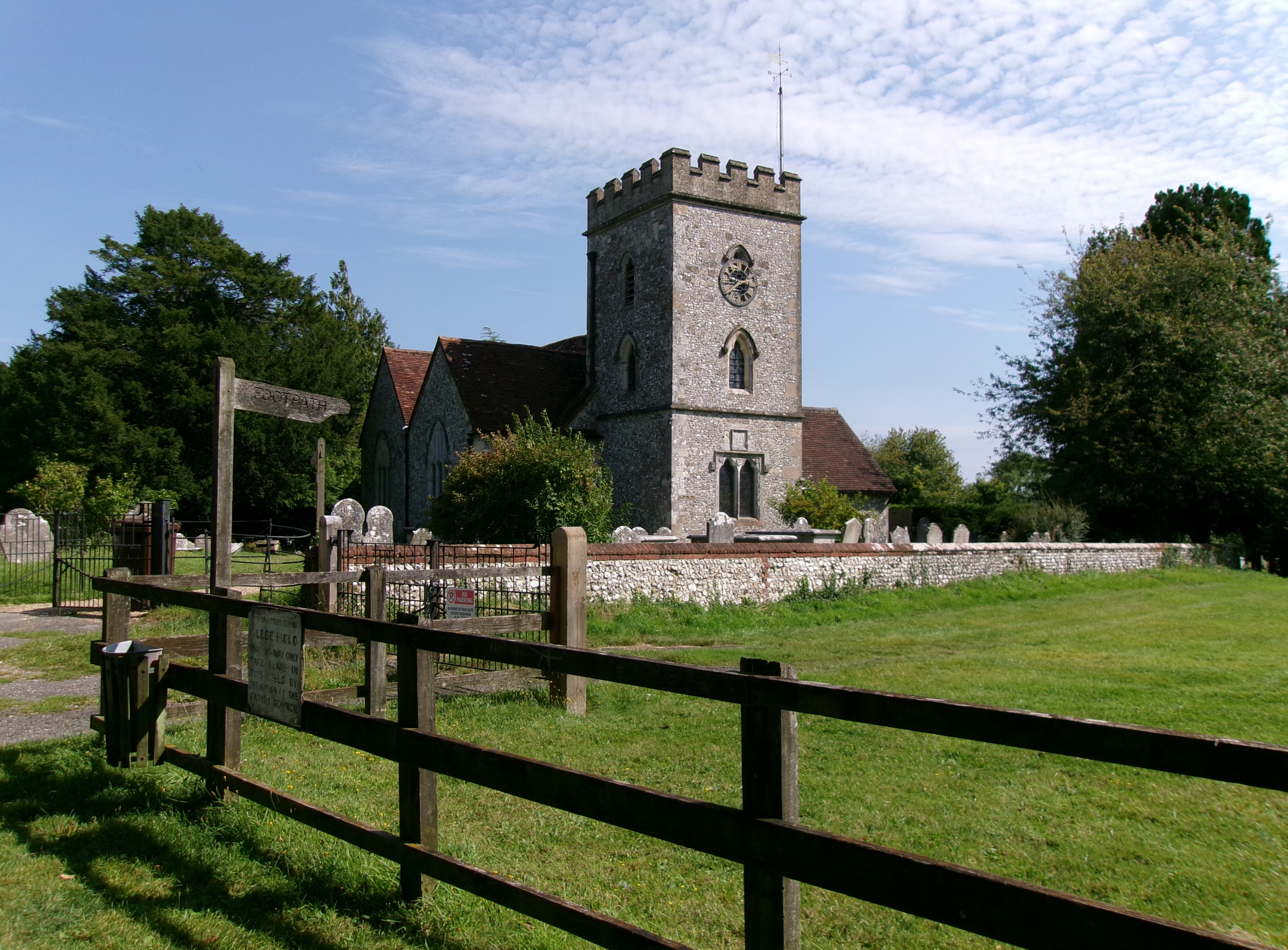
- St Andrew's church, Owslebury

- Location within Hampshire
- Population: 785; 818 (2011 Census)
- OS grid reference: SU514234
- Civil parish: Owslebury
- District: City of Winchester
- Shire county: Hampshire
- Region: South East
- Country: England
- Sovereign state: United Kingdom
- Post town: WINCHESTER
- Postcode district: SO21
- Dialling code: 01962
- Police: Hampshire and Isle of Wight
- Fire: Hampshire and Isle of Wight
- Ambulance: South Central
- UK Parliament: Winchester
- Website: Owslebury Parish Council

Owslebury is a village and civil parish in the county of Hampshire, in the south of England approximately 5 miles (8.0 km) southeast of Winchester. It lies within the administrative district of the City of Winchester.

The village has a local pub that also serves food, "The Ship Inn".

== Geography ==
The village lies at the top of a hill, on the Roman road from Winchester to the south coast near Portchester. Marwell Zoological Park is towards the south of the parish. Owslebury lies on the Pilgrims' Trail from Winchester to Mont Saint-Michel and the Monarch's Way from Worcester to Shoreham-by-Sea.

The village is relatively geographically concentrated along the road that runs through the village. It has a public house and cricket ground that has probably been in use for 150 years , an infrequent bus service, a local school, church (St Andrew's Church) and village hall. There were formerly several small shops in the village.

=== Church ===
St Andrew's Church dates back to the 14 century. It was significantly enlarged over 2 years from 1835.

== Marwell Wildlife ==
Marwell Wildlife (formerly Marwell Zoological Park) is within the boundaries of the parish.

== Swing Riots ==
On 23 November 1830 a riot occurred in Owslebury. This was part of the wave of discontent among agricultural workers which had spread across southern England and expressed itself as the Swing Riots. A large mob formed and moved from farm to farm demanding money and threatening to destroy agricultural machinery. At Rosehill they assaulted Lord Northesk's steward, Moses Stanbrook, wrecked a winnowing machine, and extorted £5. John Boyes, a local farmer, accompanied the mob demanding that farmers and landlords sign an undertaking which read "We, the undersigned, are willing to give 2s. per day to our married labourers, and 9s. per week to single men, in consideration of having our rent and tithes abated in proportion". At Marwell Hall the lady of the house, Mrs. Alice Long, gave the mob £5 and signed John's document. Eventually the mob retreated to Owslebury Down. Nine people had signed John Boyes' document.

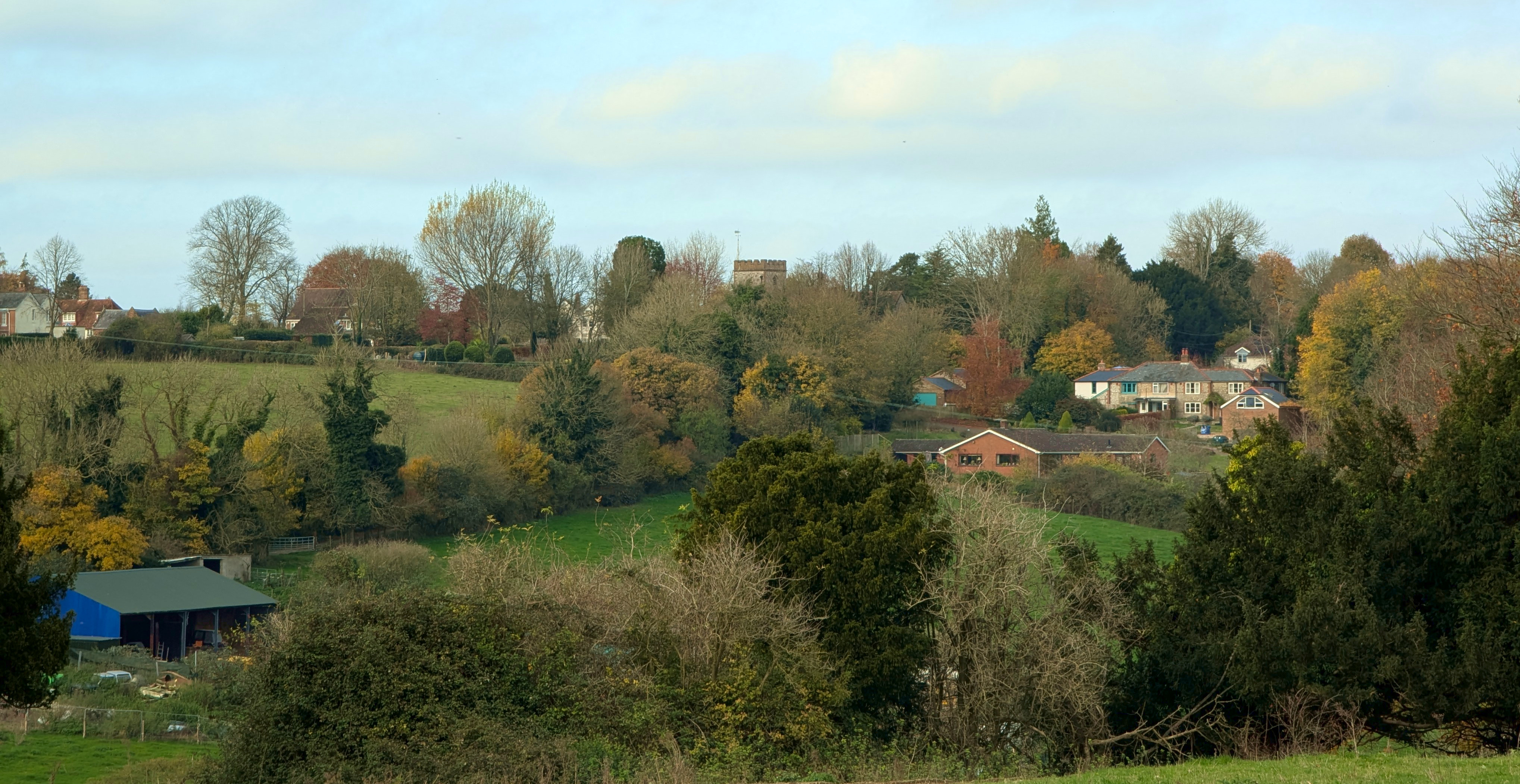
A view of the village of Owslebury, Hampshire, England which sits along the top of a ridge. November 2024.

The rioters were tried in Winchester at the end of the year and several were executed. There was a good deal of sympathy for John Boyes and he was twice acquitted before eventually being found guilty and sentenced to be transported to Van Diemen's Land for seven years. The trials were reported in The Times in December 1830 and January 1831. John Boyes did not complete his sentence. In 1835 the Home Secretary, Lord Melbourne, pardoned him and he returned home to his wife, Faith, and their children, in June of that year to continue farming in Owslebury. He died in Hensting in 1856.

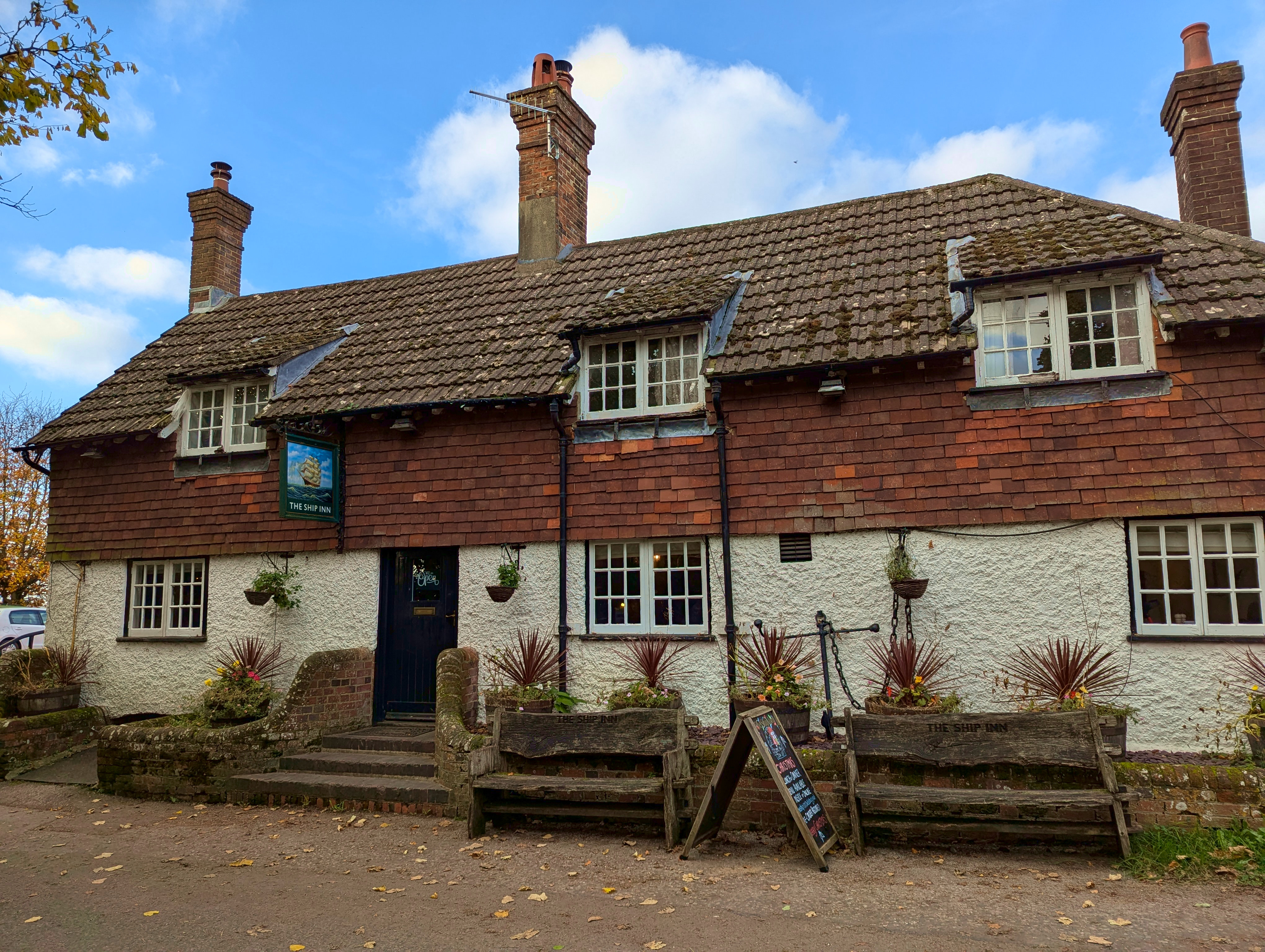
The Ship Inn at Owslebury, Hampshire, England. November 2024.

A folk song called "The Owslebury Lads", collected in the early 20th century, recalls these events. It can be heard sung by Steve Jordan on the CD "Folk Songs of Hampshire". It was collected at Winchester in 1906 by George B. Gardiner.

== Archaeology ==
Several archaeological projects have been undertaken in the neighbourhood, including major excavations in the late 1960s and early 1970s of an important Iron Age and Rural settlement and cemetery.

== Geology ==
Owslebury lies on the Upper Cretaceous chalk near the northern edge of the Hampshire Basin. The north of the parish is on the Seaford Chalk Formation. The village itself and Cockscomb Hill to the north-west are on high ground capped by the younger Newhaven Chalk Formation, deeply dissected by a dry valley running SW towards Hensting and Fishers Pond at Colden Common. Marwell in the south of the parish lies on the Palaeocene 'Reading Beds' (Lambeth Group).
