= Hangers Way =

Long-distance footpath in Hampshire, England

- Length: 21 mi (34 km)
- Location: Hampshire, England
- Trailheads: Alton; 51.152°N 0.967°W; Queen Elizabeth Country Park; 50.9614°N 0.9781°W
- Use: Hiking

Hangers Way is a 21-mile-long-distance (34 km) footpath through Hampshire, England from Alton railway station to Queen Elizabeth Country Park where it meets the South Downs Way National Trail.

The name Hanger comes from the Old English word hangra, meaning a steeply wooded slope.

The footpath passes through Petersfield and Selborne along a series of steep-sided wooded hills, known as "The Hangers". The route can be used with the part of St Swithun's Way from Farnham to Alton to follow the geological edge of the chalk landscape between the North Downs and the South Downs.

The footpath is waymarked by metal and plastic disks found attached to wooden and metal posts, trees and street furniture. The waymarks are green and show a slope with a single tree.

== The route ==
These maps show the footpath in relation to nearby major roads and towns.

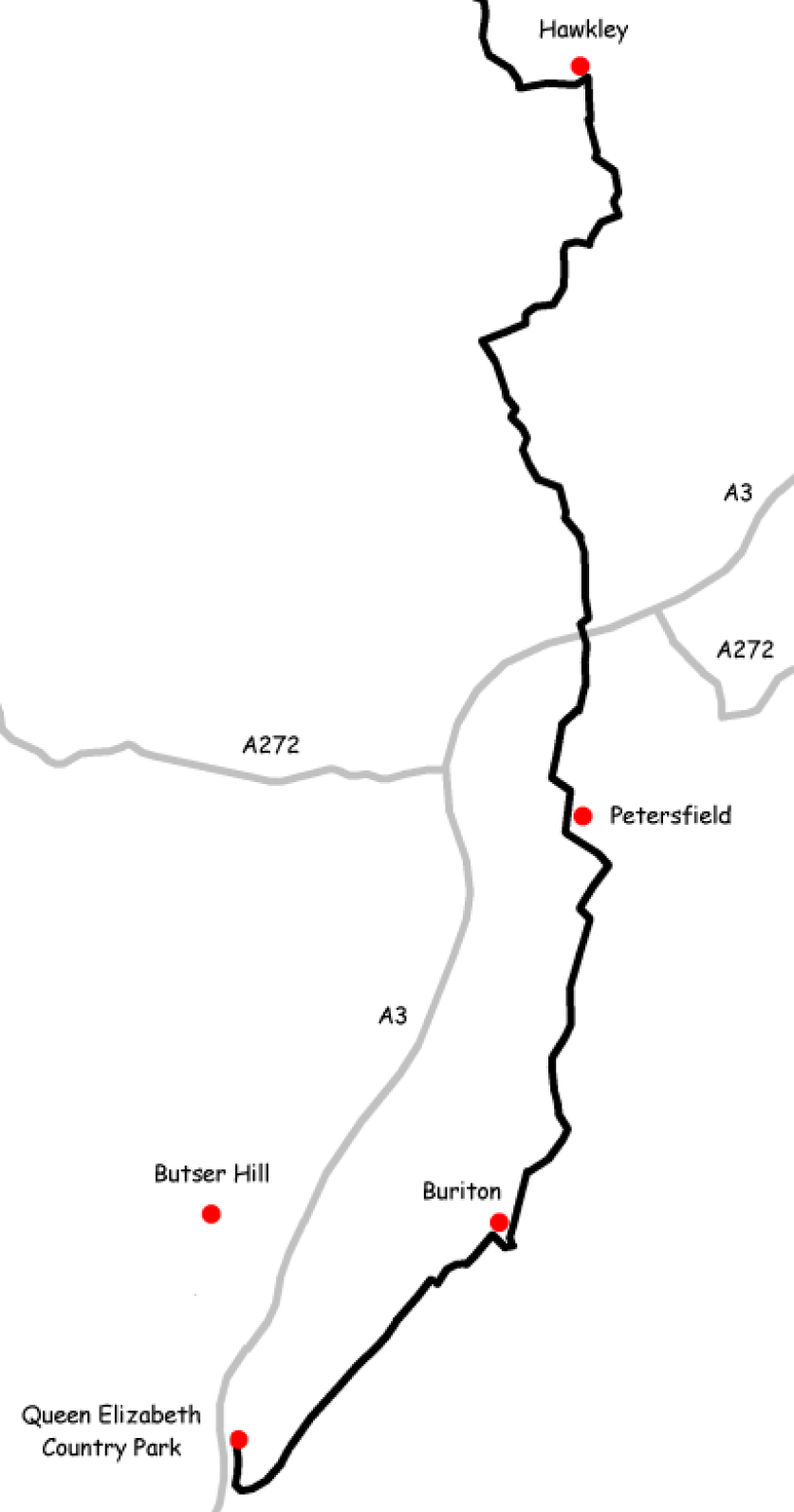
Hawkley to Queen Elizabeth Country Park

== See also ==
- Recreational walks in Hampshire
- Long-distance footpaths in the UK
