= St Swithun's Way =

Long-distance footpath in England

Coordinates: 51°6′N 1°3′W

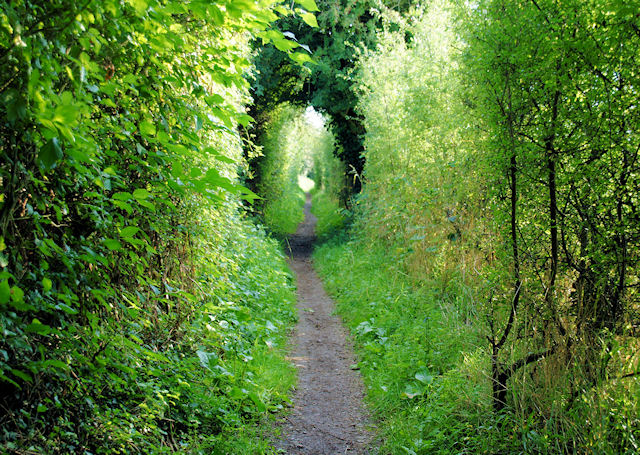
A stretch of the footpath near Headbourne Worthy

St Swithun's Way is a 34-mile (55 km) long-distance footpath in England from Winchester Cathedral, Hampshire to Farnham, Surrey. It is named after Swithun, a 9th-century Bishop of Winchester, and roughly follows the Winchester to Farnham stretch of the Pilgrims' Way. The route was opened in 2002 to mark the Golden Jubilee of Elizabeth II.

== History ==
Swithun was the Bishop of Winchester from 852 until his death in 862. After his death Swithun became associated with several miracles and was eventually declared a saint. As a result of the miracles attributed to him, and his elevation to sainthood, Swithun's shrine in Winchester became a site of pilgrimage. Winchester Cathedral was also a starting point for pilgrimages to other holy sites, the most significant being Canterbury which was reached using the Pilgrims' Way.

St Swithun's Way was opened by Hampshire County Council in 2002 to mark the Golden Jubilee of Elizabeth II. It follows the approximate route of the Winchester to Farnham section of the Pilgrims' Way; most of the original route lies under the A31 road.

== Route ==
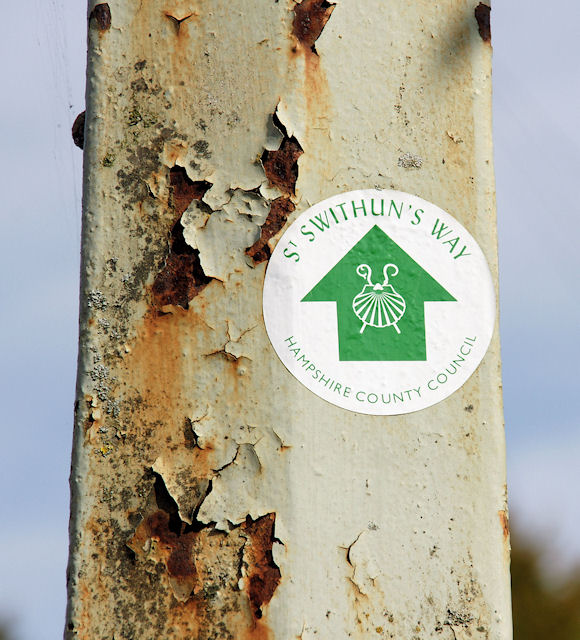
A waymark in Hyde

St Swithun's Way is partially waymarked by circular discs attached to wooden posts and street furniture. The discs are marked with a green arrow and the image of a shell over two crossing crosiers. The crosiers are meant to represent St Swithun and St Thomas Becket, a former Archbishop of Canterbury whose shrine was at Canterbury Cathedral. The route is usually well waymarked in Hampshire but is relatively poorly marked in Surrey, particularly in Farnham where the route passes through a number of narrow unmarked alleyways and through the campus of the University of Creative Arts.

The route begins at St Swithun's shrine in Winchester Cathedral and continues eastwards through the Itchen Valley, where several other named footpaths meet. The Itchen Way, in particular, follows a significant part of the route between Winchester and New Alresford. The footpath is close to the River Itchen until it reaches New Alresford, where it passes through the towns and villages that lie near the Watercress Line. From Alton it continues through farmland and the villages of Froyle and Bentley before crossing the county boundary into Surrey and reaching the castle at Farnham. To link to the North Downs Way, it is necessary to continue through the town to the railway station.

The entire route links up two National Trails connecting the South Downs Way, at Winchester, and the North Downs Way, at Farnham. The route can also be used with the Hangers Way to follow the geological edge of the chalk landscape between the North Downs and the South Downs. St Swithun's Way also links up with the Pilgrims' Trail from Winchester to Portsmouth; this trail then extends across the sea to Mont Saint-Michel in Normandy.

The route is a combination of field paths and bridleways, with some sections being very muddy after bad weather. The walk is mostly through sheep country with some horses and cattle, although most paths through the latter fields are segregated.

== See also ==
- Long-distance footpaths in the UK
- Recreational walks in Hampshire
- Downs Link
