= Colden Common =

Village and parish in Hampshire, England

Coordinates: 50.9979°N 1.3141°W

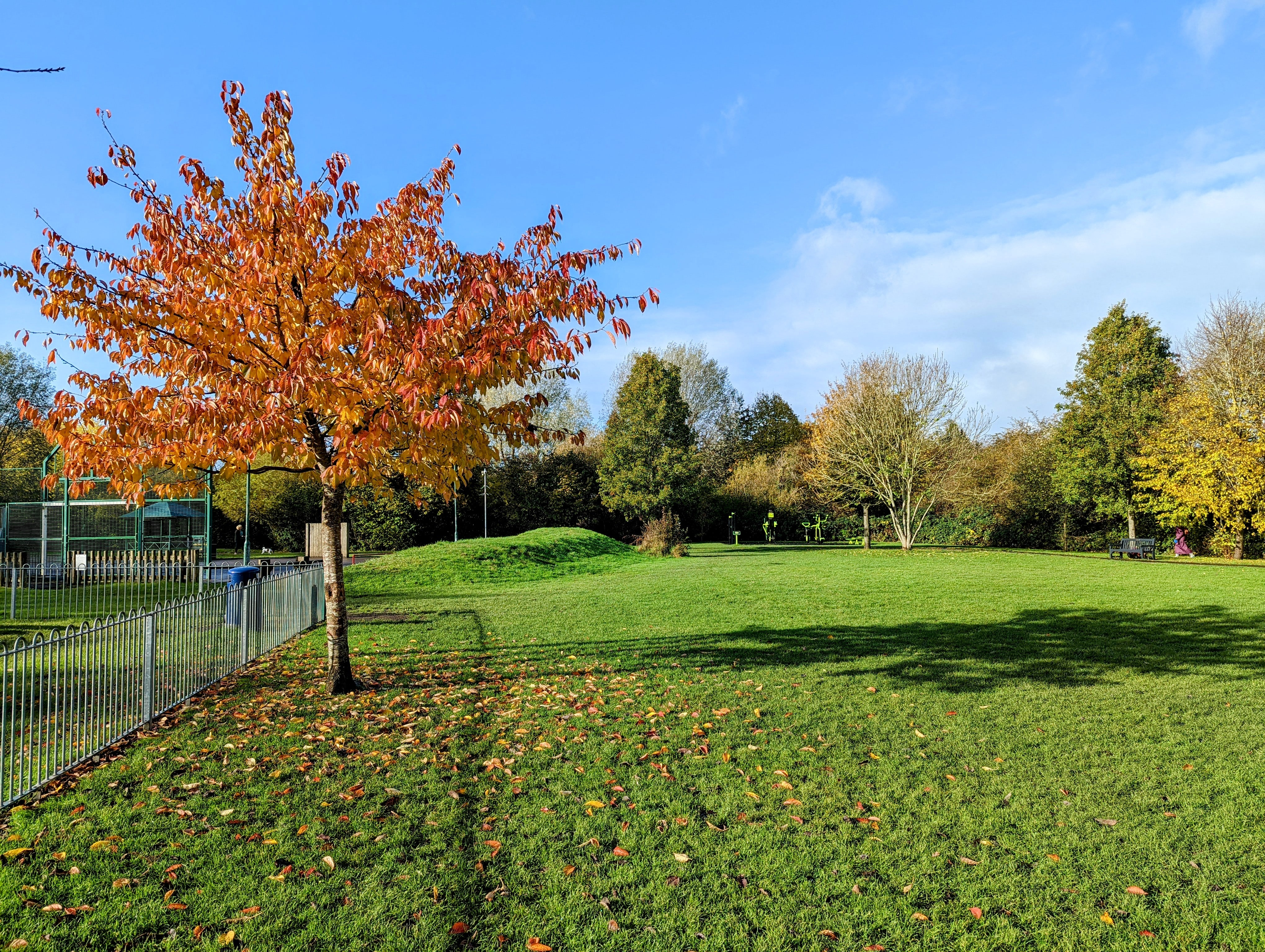
- The "Green" in Colden Common, Hampshire (November 2021)

- Location within Hampshire
- Area: 2.667 sq mi (6.91 km^{2})
- Population: 3,857 (2011 Census)
- OS grid reference: SU475225
- District: City of Winchester
- Shire county: Hampshire
- Region: South East
- Country: England
- Sovereign state: United Kingdom
- Post town: WINCHESTER
- Postcode district: SO21
- Dialling code: 01962
- Police: Hampshire and Isle of Wight
- Fire: Hampshire and Isle of Wight
- Ambulance: South Central
- UK Parliament: Winchester
- Website: Colden Common Parish Council

Colden Common is a civil parish in the Winchester District of Hampshire, England, approximately 5 miles south of the city of Winchester, covering an area of 690.74 hectares (2.6670 sq mi) with a resident population of approximately 4,000 people. It includes the village of Colden Common and the hamlets of Hensting, Fisher's Pond, Nob's Crook, Highbridge and Brambridge. Part of the parish lies within the South Downs National Park.

== History ==
Known in the 13th Century as Colvedene, the origin of the name is uncertain but may come from Old English clofa (cleft) and denu (valley).

The area that is now known as Colden Common is referred to as Golding Common in the First Edition Ordnance Survey Map of Winchester and Solent.

The area was a major centre of palaeolithic flint tool manufacture, with evidence of a "factory" covering 400 square metres discovered during a 1915 excavation in Highbridge.

The parish was originally part of the manors of Twyford and Owslebury. The Ecclesiastical Parish of Colden Common was formed in 1843, with Holy Trinity Church, designed by George Guillaume, completed the following year on the southern boundary of the parish. It then became an independent civil parish in 1932.

A number of brickworks were formerly located in Colden Common, including Charles Mitchell's Works which until its closure in 1957 was the last brickworks in Hampshire to make hand-made bricks by the clamp method.

Colden Common grew significantly over the 20th Century, from a population of 748 in 1901 to 3,681 in 2001.

=== Brambridge House ===
Brambridge House is a Grade II* listed building – a three-storey former country house on the bank of the River Itchen. It was originally built in 1762, remodelled after an 1872 fire, and was converted to residential flats in the 1950s. The site is believed to be the birthplace of the Catholic martyr Swithun Wells.

== Geography ==
There are two major roads in Colden Common—the B3354 and the B3335. The B3354 is known as the Main Road whilst it passes through the village, and the B3335 is called Highbridge Road. Southampton Airport is 5 miles (8 km) south of the village. The M3 Motorway is 3 miles (5 km) west of the village. Junction 11, which is north of the village, down the B3354 and B3335 roads, is in Twyford Down which is south of Winchester. The other junction, closer to the village, is Junction 12, west of the village, north of Eastleigh and near Allbrook; the junction is down the B3335 and A335 (Highbridge Road), Allbrook Hill (B3335) and Allbrook Way (A335) (tall vehicles can't go this way because there is a relatively low bridge in Allbrook, under the railway line to London).

== Demography ==
The parish has a 97% white population, with a median age of 45. 78% of households own their house. 40% of employed people are employed in managerial or professional occupations.

== Culture and Community ==
The Non-League football club Colden Common F.C. play at Oakwood Park, in nearby Otterbourne.

Colden Common has both Anglican and Methodist churches. There is a community centre located at the centre of the village. The school is Colden Common primary school.

The pubs within the boundaries of the Parish are The Rising Sun and The Fishers Pond. Former pubs, now closed, include The Queens Head, The Dog and Crook and The Black Horse. The Dog and Crook has since reopened and been renamed The Brambridge Arms.

The main entrance of Marwell Zoo is situated on the boundary with Colden Common and Owslebury.

Colden Common is twinned with Saint-Vigor-le-Grand, France
