= Itchen Abbas =

Village in Hampshire, England

Coordinates: 51.093°N 1.238°W

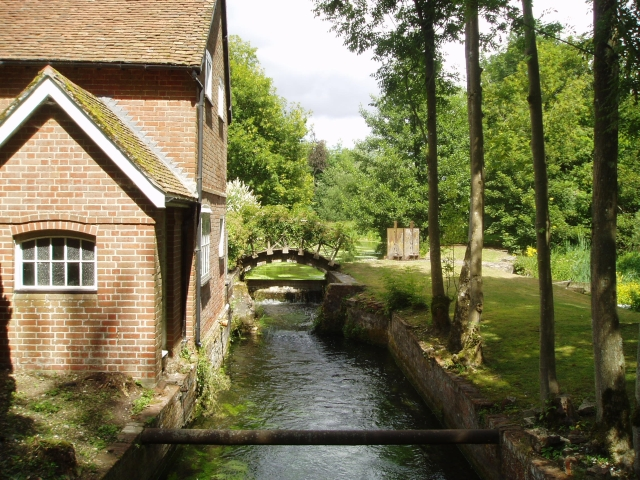
- Disused mill stream at Itchen Abbas

- Location within Hampshire
- Population: 567
- OS grid reference: SU5332
- Civil parish: Itchen Valley
- District: City of Winchester
- Shire county: Hampshire
- Region: South East
- Country: England
- Sovereign state: United Kingdom
- Post town: WINCHESTER
- Postcode district: SO21
- Dialling code: 01962
- Police: Hampshire and Isle of Wight
- Fire: Hampshire and Isle of Wight
- Ambulance: South Central
- UK Parliament: Winchester
- Website: Itchen Valley Parish Council

Itchen Abbas is a village and former civil parish, now in the parish of Itchen Valley, in the Winchester district, in the county of Hampshire, England. The village is on the River Itchen about 4 miles (6.4 km) north-east of Winchester.

== Parish church ==
The Church of England parish church of St John the Baptist was originally Norman and retains an original Norman doorway and chancel arch. St. John's was rebuilt in 1867 to a Norman Revival design by the architect William Coles. It is a charming Victorian Church with a barrel-vaulted roof. The church lost all remaining Victorian fittings when it was re-ordered in 2009; the pews replaced with stackable chairs, and the original floor covered with carpeting, leaving the church with a much-impaired acoustic, and a rather bland interior.

== History ==
The Domesday Book in 1086 recorded that the manor of Icene (Itchen) was held by Hugh son of Baldri (Hugh fitzBaldric), that it had previously been held by St Mary's Abbey, Winchester, that the abbess claimed it, and that King William had restored it to the abbey; hence the village became known as Itchen Abbess which evolved to Itchen Abbas.

Itchen Abbas is mentioned in the Hampshire folk song "Avington Pond" as the place where the builders of the pond were paid their wages. They were given their money in the Plough public house.

Abbey House, 0.5 miles (800 m) north-east of the village, is a Grade II listed country house of five bays and two stories built in 1693. Originally a rectory, it was altered in the 19th century.

The Alton, Alresford and Winchester Railway opened Itchen Abbas railway station in 1865. British Railways closed the line and station in 1973.

Charles Kingsley was a regular visitor to Itchen Abbas. The village and river provided inspiration for the setting of his novel The Water Babies.

The village is the site of Sir Edward Grey's fishing hut, where he spent the night of 3 August 1914 before travelling to London to announce the United Kingdom's entry into First World War.

In 1931 the civil parish had a population of 303. On 1 April 1932 the parish was abolished to form Itchen Valley.

During the Second World War a fuel pipeline was laid from a depot at Hamble to a depot near Aldermaston, passing through Itchen Abbas, as part of the Government Pipelines and Storage System (now Exolum Pipeline System). In 2006 the pipeline was still operating.

== Sources and further reading ==
- Page, W.H., ed. (1911). A History of the County of Hampshire, Volume 4. Victoria County History. pp. 191–192.
- Pevsner, Nikolaus; Lloyd, David (1967). Hampshire and the Isle of Wight. The Buildings of England. Harmondsworth: Penguin Books. pp. 308–309.
