= Itchen Valley Country Park =

Park in Hampshire, England

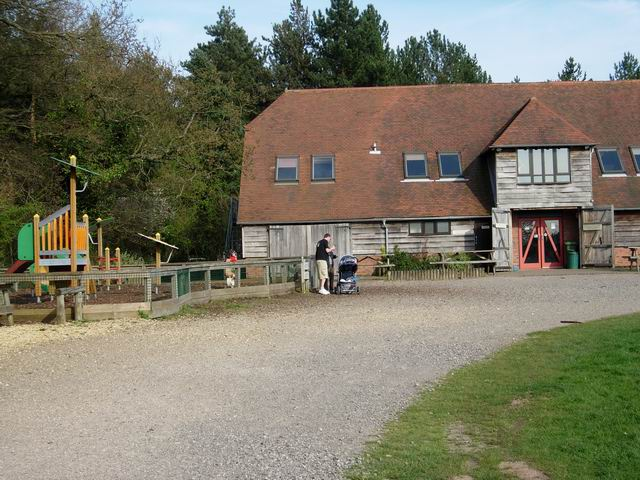
- The visitors' centre
- Interactive map of Itchen Valley Country Park
- Type: Country park
- Location: West End, Hampshire, UK
- Coordinates: 50.943°N 1.345°W
- Area: 440 acres (1.8 km^{2})
- Operator: Eastleigh Borough Council
- Status: Open all year

Itchen Valley Country Park is a country park in West End, Hampshire, England which covers 440 acres (1.8 km^{2}) of woodland, meadow and amenity areas. As the name suggests, the River Itchen runs through the park, although it cannot be accessed as this section is privately owned by the Lower Itchen fisheries. The park has a number of walks and trails, including an active trail for cycling and running, and a nature trail for observing birds, butterflies and wildflowers. There are a number of facilities for children, including two formal outdoor play areas, an indoor area for young children and a family trail with many natural play features to enjoy. The Itchen Navigation footpath borders the park to the west. The park has been awarded the Green Flag award every year since 2009.

The park is open to vehicles every day of the year between 5.00am and 8.30pm. Pedestrians can access the site through gates off Allington Lane and via the water meadows gates which link to the Itchen Navigation footpath. The onsite cafe is open everyday except Christmas and Boxing Day. The opening times for the cafe as of 2026 are 10.00am-16.30pm.

Three businesses run from the park including Go-Ape Southamtpon, Hensting Alpacas and Youth Options.

== History ==
The site is on the opposite bank of the river to Southampton Airport, the runway of which is reputedly built over the remains of a Roman villa.

The park was established when over 350 acres (1.4 km^{2}) of the site were acquired by Eastleigh Borough Council in 1979. The visitor centre was built in 1990. From 2023-2025, large upgrades were made to the site including building a new community building called The Hide, renovating both large outdoor playgrounds, upgrading and adding extra toilets and building a new larger car park.

In 2010 work started on a Go Ape adventure course in the park, which opened in Spring 2011.

Since February 2020, a free timed 5 km parkrun is held at 9am every Saturday.

== Geography ==
The park contains a 250-acre (100 ha) water meadow nature reserve, 90 acres (36 ha) of ancient woodland (a third of which is classified as "semi-rural"), 60 acres (24 ha) of grazing land and a 40-acre (16 ha) recreation field.

== Gallery ==
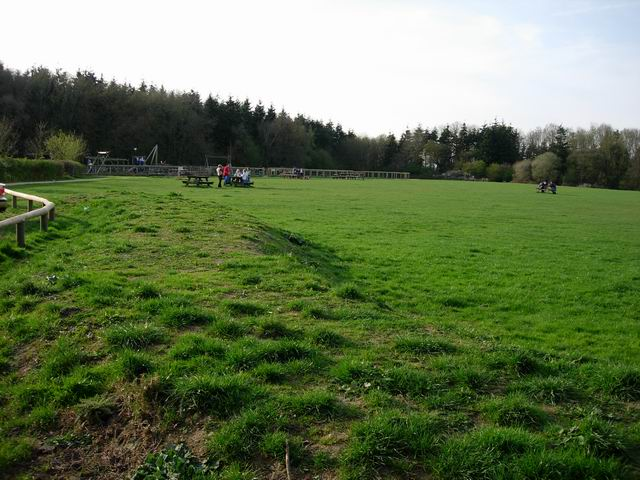
The recreation field and playground

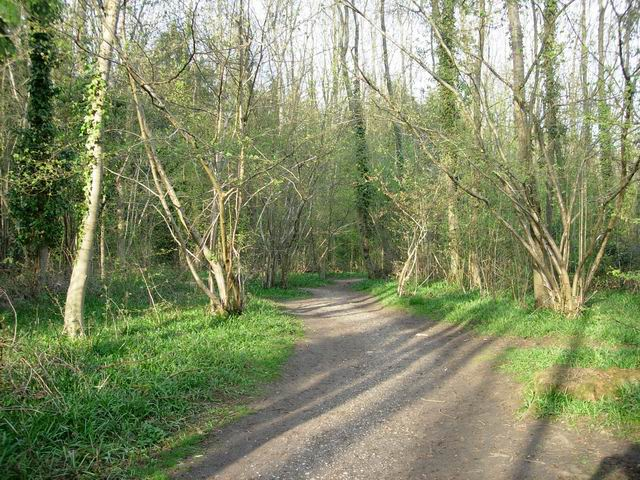
Part of the woodland trail
