= Clarendon Way =

26-mile footpath in southern England

Coordinates: 51.062°N 1.316°W

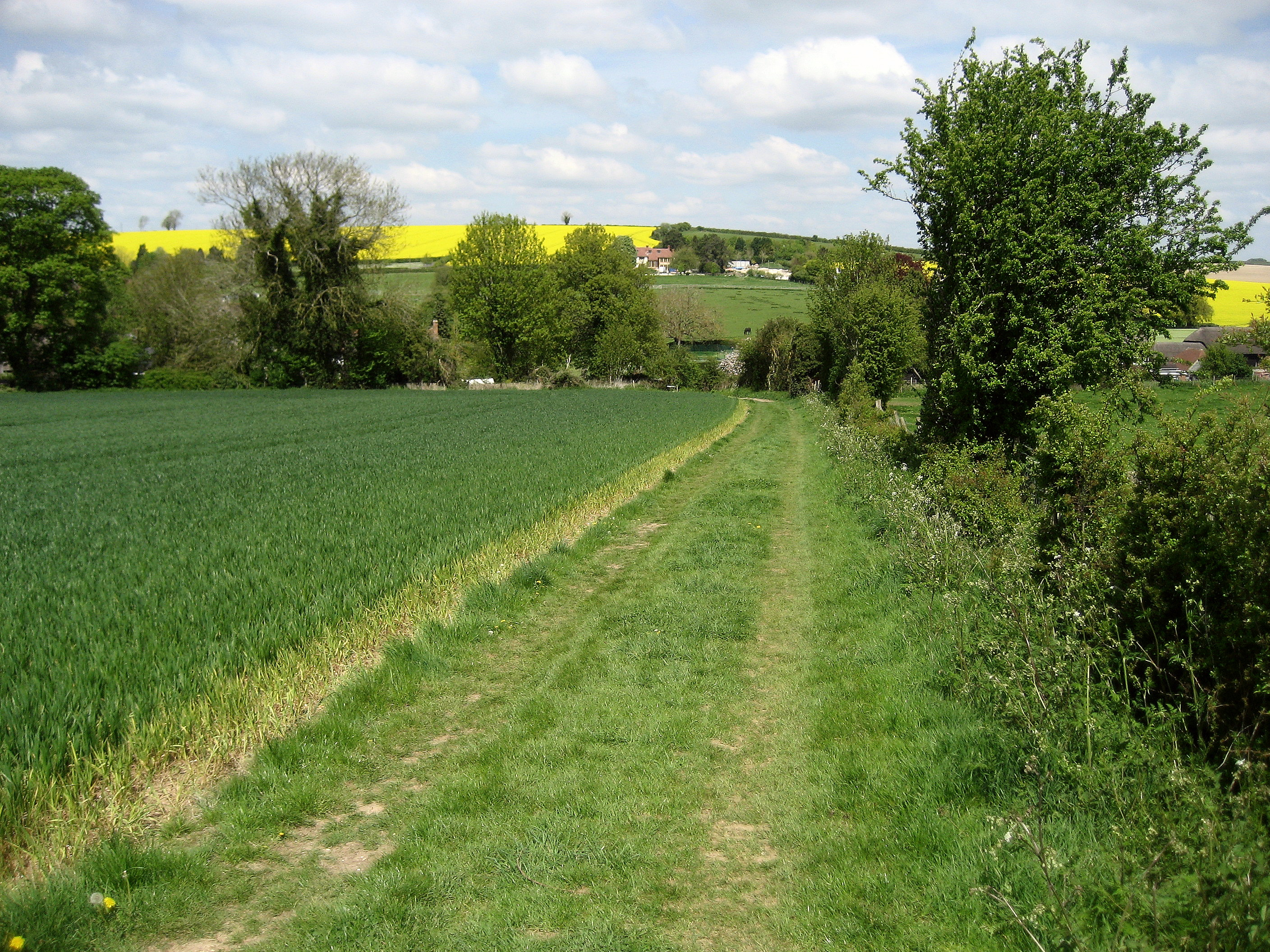
- View near King's Somborne
- Length: 26 mi (42 km)
- Location: Southern England
- Trailheads: Salisbury Cathedral, Wiltshire; Winchester Cathedral, Hampshire.
- Use: Hiking

The Clarendon Way is a recreational footpath in Hampshire and Wiltshire, England. It starts beside the waters of the River Itchen in the centre of Winchester and ends near the River Avon at Salisbury Cathedral. The path passes through the Clarendon Estate and close to the 12th century ruins of Clarendon Palace. The path also passes through Farley Mount Country Park and the villages of Pitton, The Winterslows, Broughton and King's Somborne. The path shares part of its route with the Monarch's Way long-distance footpath.

The footpath is waymarked by metal and plastic disks attached to wooden and metal posts, trees and street furniture. This route is shown as a series of green diamonds on Ordnance Survey 1:25,000 maps and as a series of red diamonds on Ordnance Survey 1:50,000 maps.

Several charity events take place along the Clarendon Way:

- Each June, the Naomi House & Jacksplace charity organises a sponsored walk along the Clarendon Way. The event attracts thousands of walkers and raises significant sums for the charity.
- The Clarendon Marathon takes place every year on the first Sunday in October. The event is organised by the Rotary Clubs of Winchester and Salisbury, along with other volunteers, and attracts over one thousand runners each year. The proceeds from the race are donated to good causes and many runners also raise money for a charity of their choice. Competitors can choose between full marathon, half marathon and 5 mile options, and it's also possible to cover the full marathon distance as a four-person relay team.

== Maps ==
These maps show the footpath in relation to nearby major roads. Maps are not on the same scale.

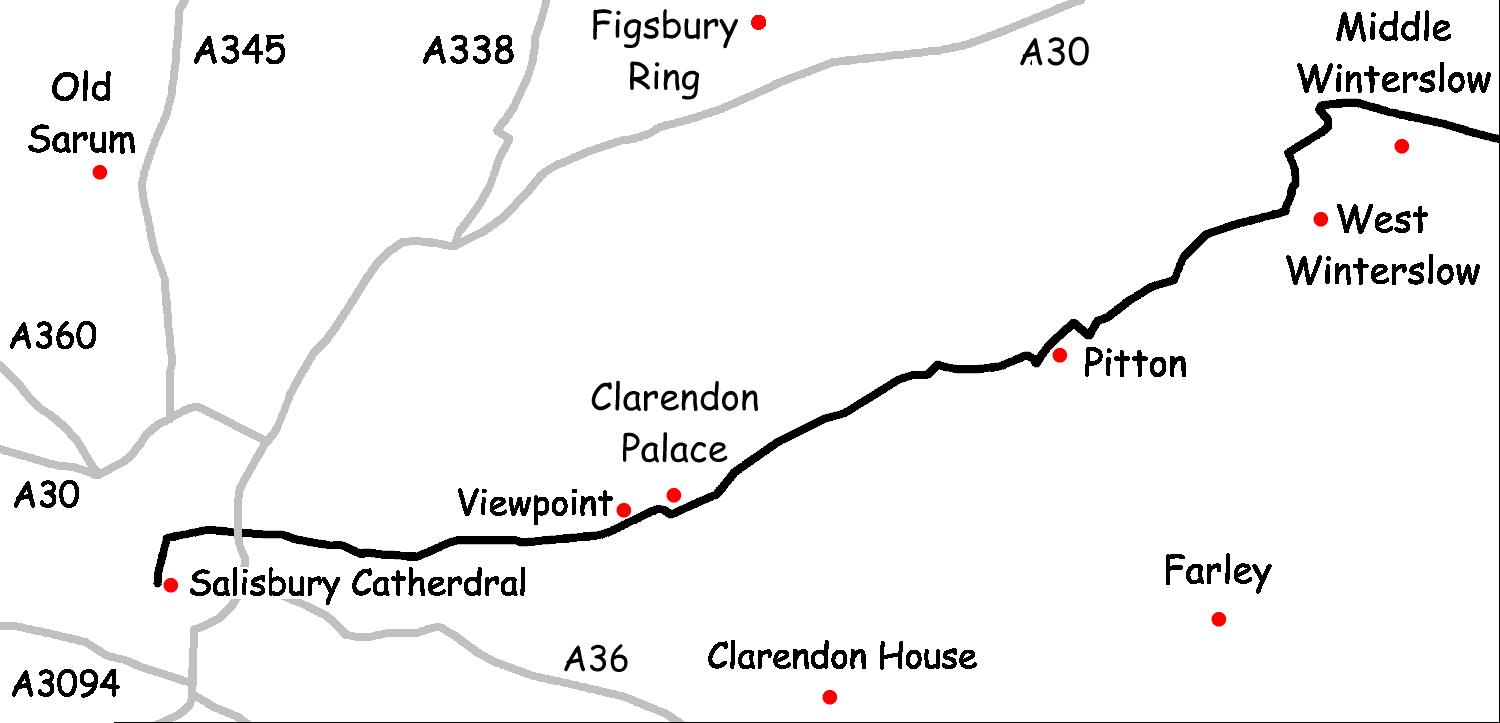
Salisbury to Middle Winterslow

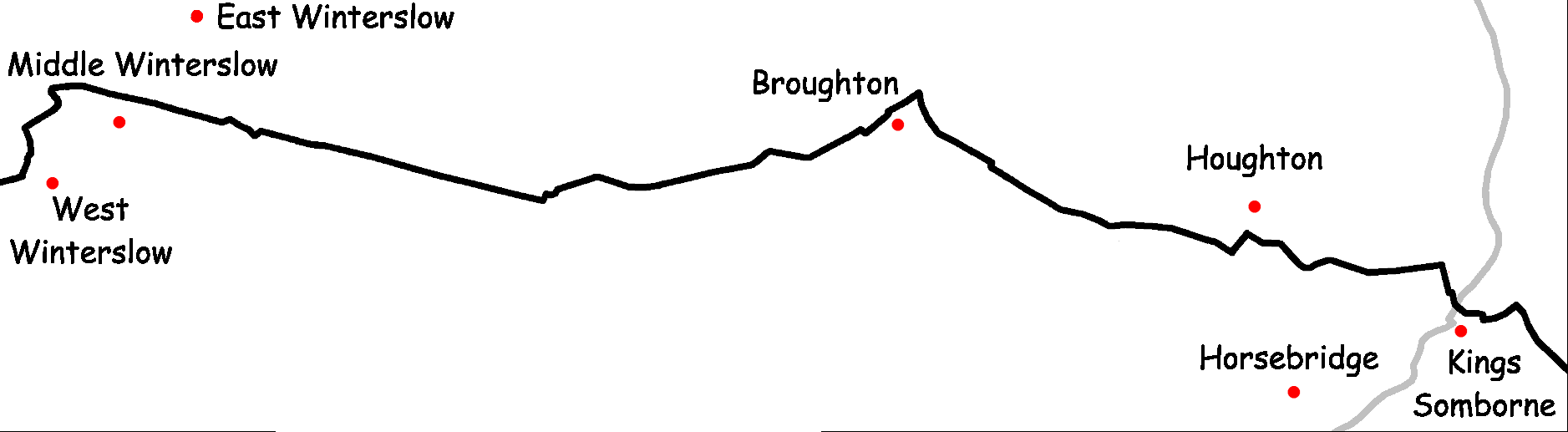
Middle Winterslow to King's Somborne

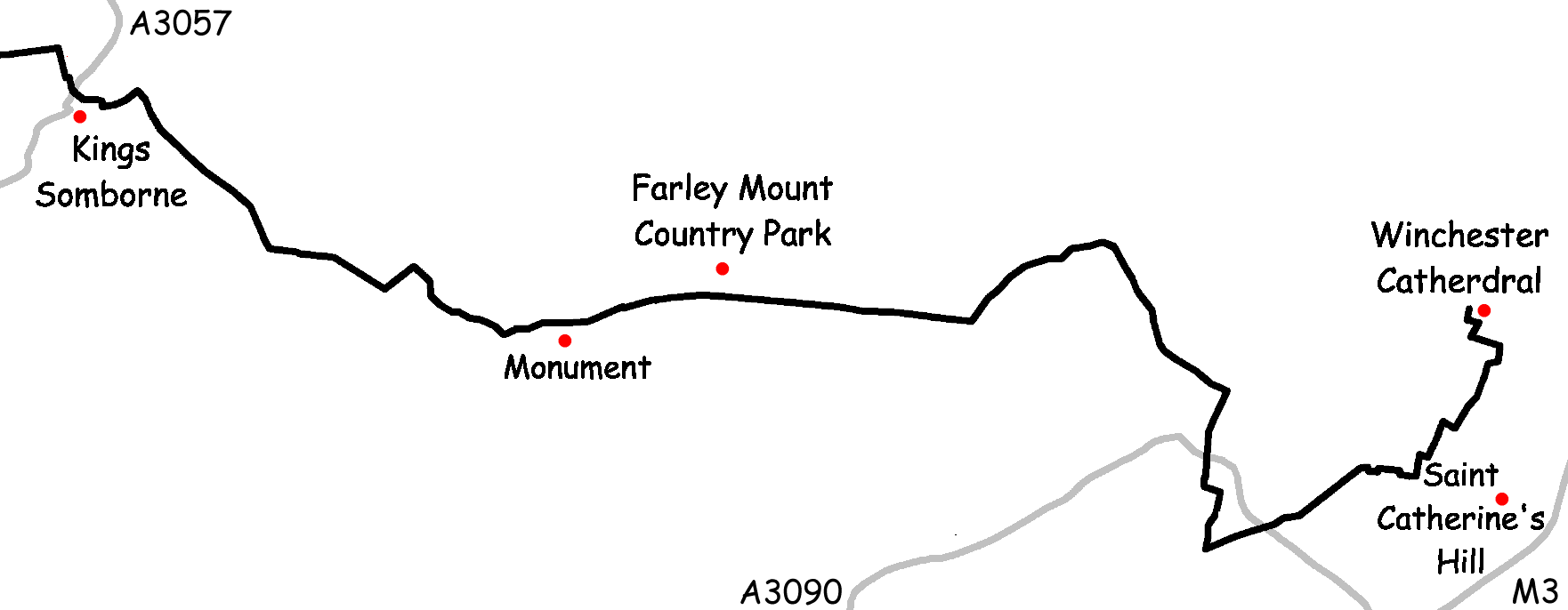
King's Somborne to Winchester

== See also ==
- Recreational walks in Hampshire
- Long-distance footpaths in the UK
