= Three Castles Path =

Long-distance path in southern England

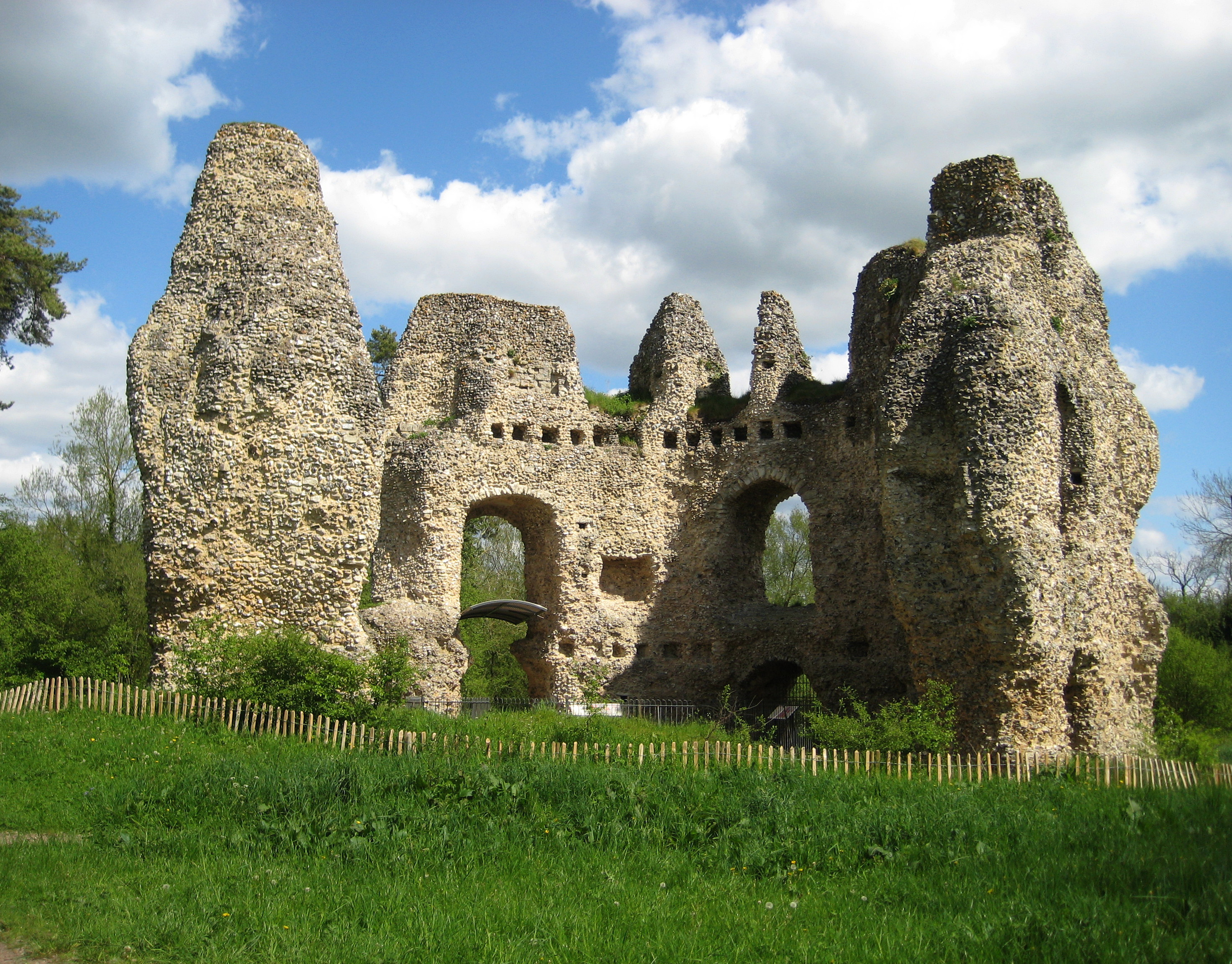
- Odiham Castle, which lies on the Three Castles Path
- Location: Berkshire and Hampshire, England, UK grid reference SU945855

Trail map
- Location in England

The Three Castles Path is a 60-mile long-distance footpath in England from Winchester Great Hall, Hampshire, to Windsor Castle, Berkshire, via the ruins of Odiham Castle (also known as 'King John's Castle').

Winchester Great Hall is the only surviving part of Winchester Castle.

The route passes through the towns of New Alresford, Hartley Wintney, Sandhurst, Bracknell and Ascot and the villages of Martyr Worthy, Itchen Abbas, Abbotstone, Upper Wield, Ellisfield, Bradley, Greywell, North Warnborough and Odiham. The path also passes through Trilakes Country Park, Ascot Racecourse, Windsor Great Park and close to Broadmoor Hospital. Part of the footpath also follows the Basingstoke Canal towpath.

The route is not waymarked in its entirety, though there are some waymarks.

== See also ==
- Long-distance footpaths in the UK
