= Pilgrims' Trail =

Long-distance footpath in Hampshire, England

Coordinates: 51.061°N 1.314°W

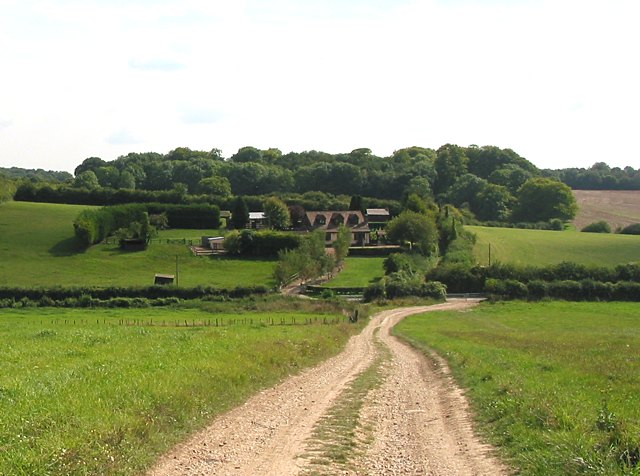
The trail near Owslebury

The Pilgrims' Trail is a 155-mile long-distance footpath that connects Winchester Cathedral in Hampshire, England to Mont Saint-Michel in Normandy.

The UK section of the footpath passes through the towns of Owslebury and Bishop's Waltham as well as the Forestry Commission owned Forest of Bere. It ends at the Portsmouth ferry terminal.

The Hampshire section, known as the Hampshire Millennium Pilgrims Trail which opened in 1999, is a 29-mile section that is waymarked with green disks attached to wooden and metal posts, trees and street furniture. In the French section the waymarks are blue.

Within Portsmouth, the section of the route from Portsbridge to the Ferry Terminal is a shared cycling and pedestrian route and also marked with blue cycle and pedestrian route signs.

== See also ==
- Long-distance footpaths in the UK
- Pilgrims' Way, a long-distance mixed-category pathway from Winchester to Canterbury in Kent
- Les chemins du Mont St Michel - Les chemins du mont saint michel, the associations website.
