= King's Way =

Long-distance footpath in Hampshire, England

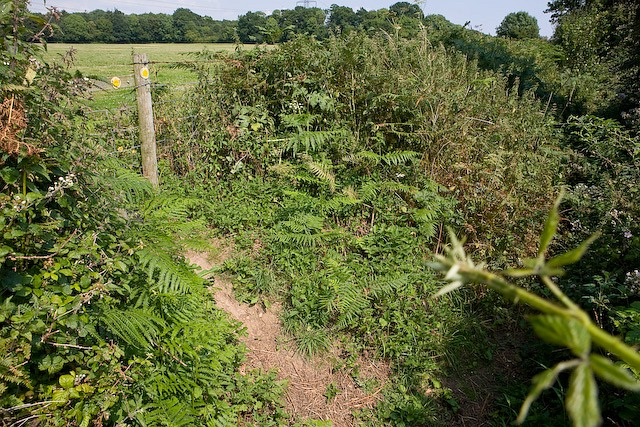
- King's Way crossing Menslands Lane
- Length: 45 mi (72 km)
- Location: Southern England
- Trailheads: Winchester 51.058890°N 1.308001°W; Portchester Castle
- Use: Hiking
- Season: All year

King's Way or the Allan King Way is a 45-mile-long-distance (72 km) footpath in Hampshire, England. This footpath was created by the Hampshire Area of the Ramblers' Association as a memorial to the late Allan King, a former Publicity Officer who was partly responsible for the formation of a number of Groups in Hampshire. The route runs from Portchester to Winchester via Bishops Waltham and passes by sites such as Portchester Castle, Fort Nelson, and Bishops Waltham Palace.

The footpath is waymarked by metal and plastic disks found attached to wooden and metal posts, trees, and street furniture, marked "Allan Kings Way". Where the route coincides with the same route as other long-distance paths, the waymarking is not continuous. The words "Kings way" and "44 miles from Porchester" are etched on wooden waymarker in Winchester that marks the end of the route. There is a free downloadable guide book to the route available on the Eastleigh Ramblers web site.

This route is shown as a series of green diamonds on Ordnance Survey 1:25,000 maps and as a series of red diamonds on Ordnance Survey 1:50,000 maps.

== See also ==
- Long-distance footpaths in the UK
