= Winchester Castle =

Medieval building in Winchester, Hampshire

- Hampshire, England
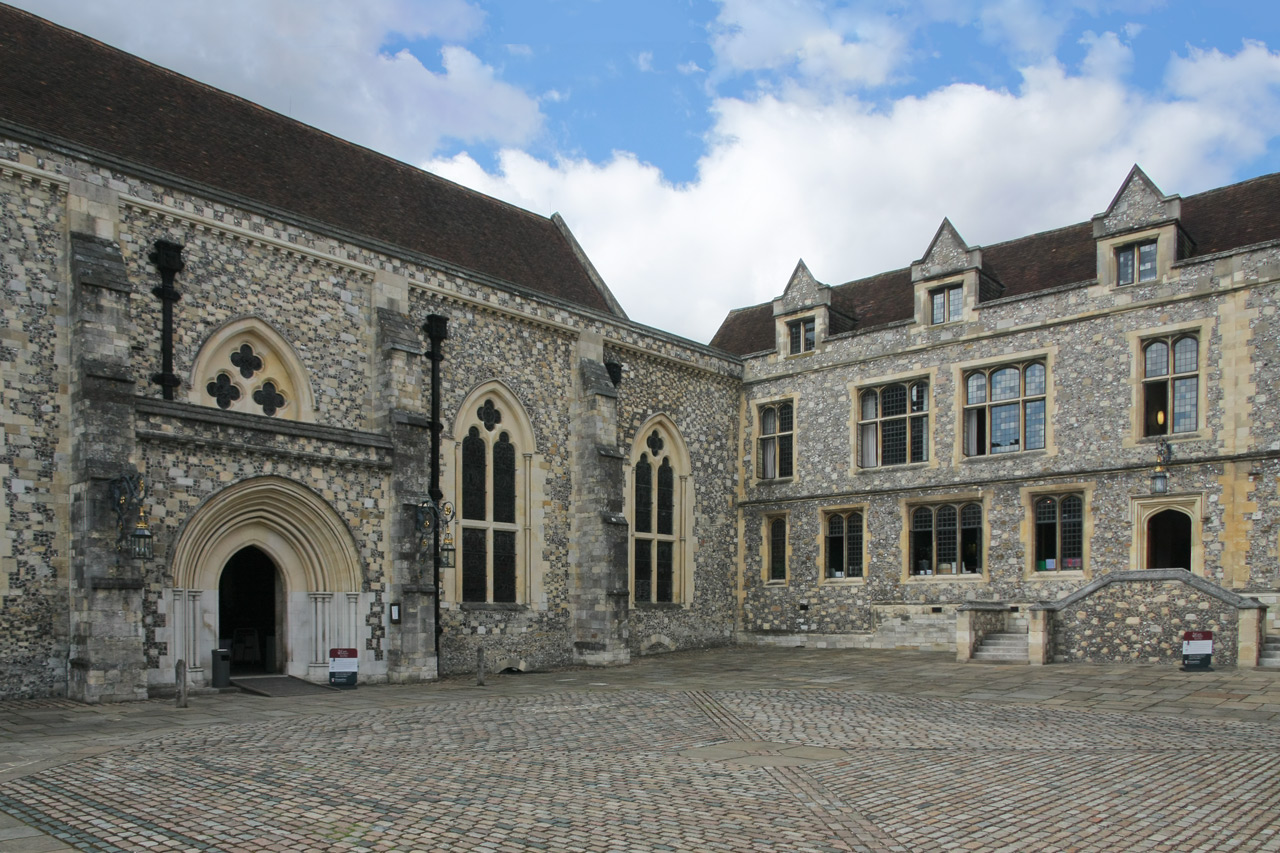
- The Great Hall, built by Henry III

Site information
- Owner: Hampshire County Council
- Condition: Great Hall remains, used as museum

Location
- Shown within Winchester
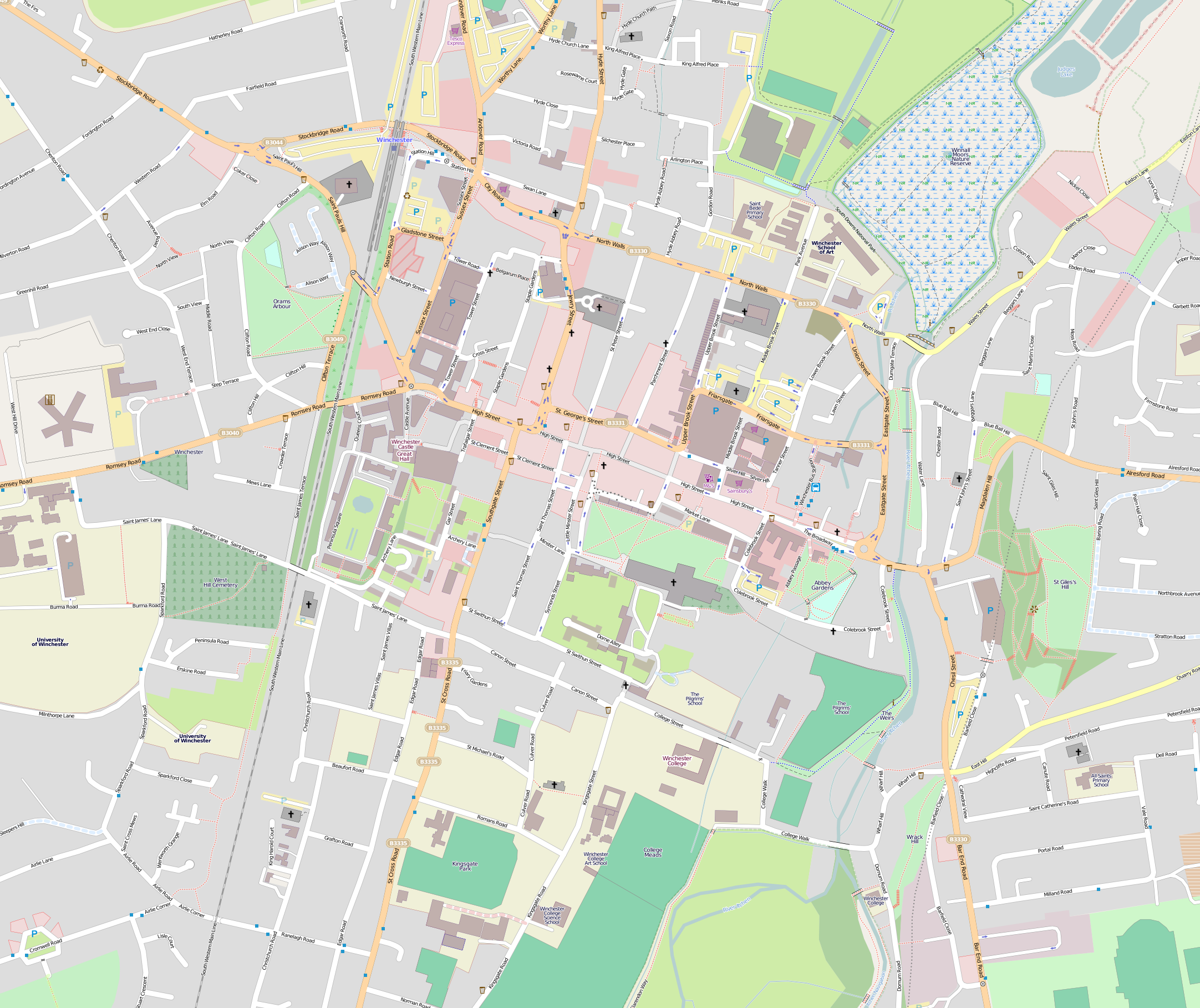
- Location within Central Winchester
- Coordinates: 51°03′45″N 1°19′14″W grid reference SU476295

Site history
- Built: 1067
- Built by: William the Conqueror
- Materials: Stone
- Demolished: 1649
- Battles/wars: Rout of Winchester; First Barons' War; English Civil War
- Events: Trial of Walter Raleigh; Bloody Assizes

Winchester Castle was a royal residence in Winchester, Hampshire, England, founded in 1067 by William the Conqueror. It served as a seat of royal power in the medieval period. Much of the castle has since been lost, with the exception of the Great Hall, regarded as one of the finest surviving medieval halls in England and now housing a museum of Winchester's history. Next to the castle is the intact Westgate, part of the city's walls and also now a museum. The Great Hall contains the Round Table, a large 13th century wooden tabletop traditionally associated with the Arthurian legend. The Great Hall is a Grade I listed building.

== History ==
=== Early history ===
Around AD 70 the Romans constructed a massive earth rampart 800 ft (240 m) long and 200 ft (61 m) wide. On top of this they built a fort to protect the city of Venta Belgarum. The city then became the capital of the Anglo-Saxon Kingdom of Wessex. This site was chosen by William the Conqueror as the site of one of the first Norman castles in England.

The castle was built in 1067 and for over one hundred years it was the seat of government of the Norman kings. The castle coexisted with the Saxon palace by the cathedral until 1141, when the palace was destroyed by fire. In 1141, during The Anarchy, forces of the Empress Matilda were besieged by the forces of King Stephen at the castle, in the Rout of Winchester. Henry II built a stone keep to house the royal treasury and the Domesday Book.

=== Remodelling under Henry III ===
Side gables in the hall of Stokesay Castle. That at Winchester would originally have appeared similar, albeit much grander.

Between 1222 and 1235, Henry III, who was born at Winchester Castle, built the Great Hall, built to a "double cube" design, measuring 110 ft (33.53 m) by 55 ft (16.76 m) by 55 ft (16.76 m). The Great Hall was built of flint with stone dressings; the internal columns are of Purbeck marble, and are similar to contemporary cathedrals such as Salisbury. Originally it had lower eaves and gables above the tall plate-traceried windows; a similar arrangement survives intact at the smaller Stokesay Castle, Shropshire. The Great Hall formed part of a wider programme of renovation for the fastidious king, the rest of which has since been destroyed: within the castle walls, Henry built a courtyard house with round towers. His minute and constantly-changing directions, down to the design of windows and the subjects of wall-paintings, are recorded in the Pipe Rolls. As well as civilising the domestic provisions, Henry improved the defences. The foundations of a 13th-century round tower and posterns are still visible. Such underground passages were a brief fashion of the time, also being seen in Henry's expansion of Dover Castle. In total, Henry spent around £10,000 on improvements to the castle.

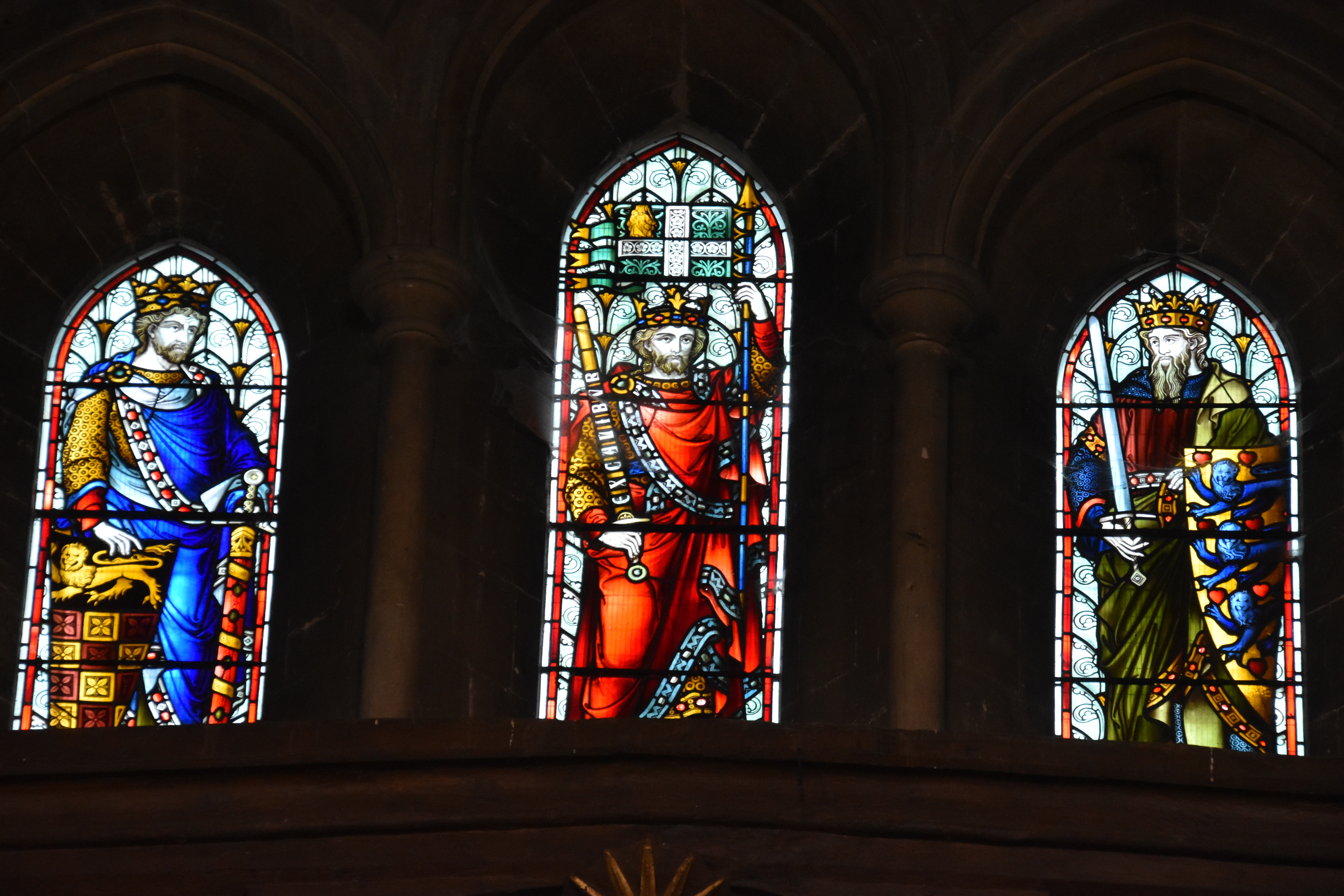
A detail of the stained glass window on the west wall of the Great Hall. The central figure is assumed to be King Arthur holding his sword Excalibur.

An Arthurian Round Table was placed in the Great Hall by Edward I in the late 13th century. It was repainted in its present form for Henry VIII in 1522, at which time the legs were removed and it was hung on the wall. Around the edge of the table were painted the names of King Arthur's knights. The portrait of King Arthur is recognisably a depiction of the young Henry VIII. A series of pictorial epigrams illuminated in medieval monastic style known as the Winchester Panels were also hung in the Great Hall. They are thought to have depicted the 25 knights of the Round Table and illustrated the challenges facing a maturing character as it progresses round the great "Wheel of Life".

In 1287, Asher, the son of the Jewish businesswoman Licoricia of Winchester, was imprisoned in the castle and wrote a Hebrew inscription on the wall of the Jews' Tower. This internment preceded a tax on the Jews by Edward I, before their expulsion in 1290.

=== Later history ===
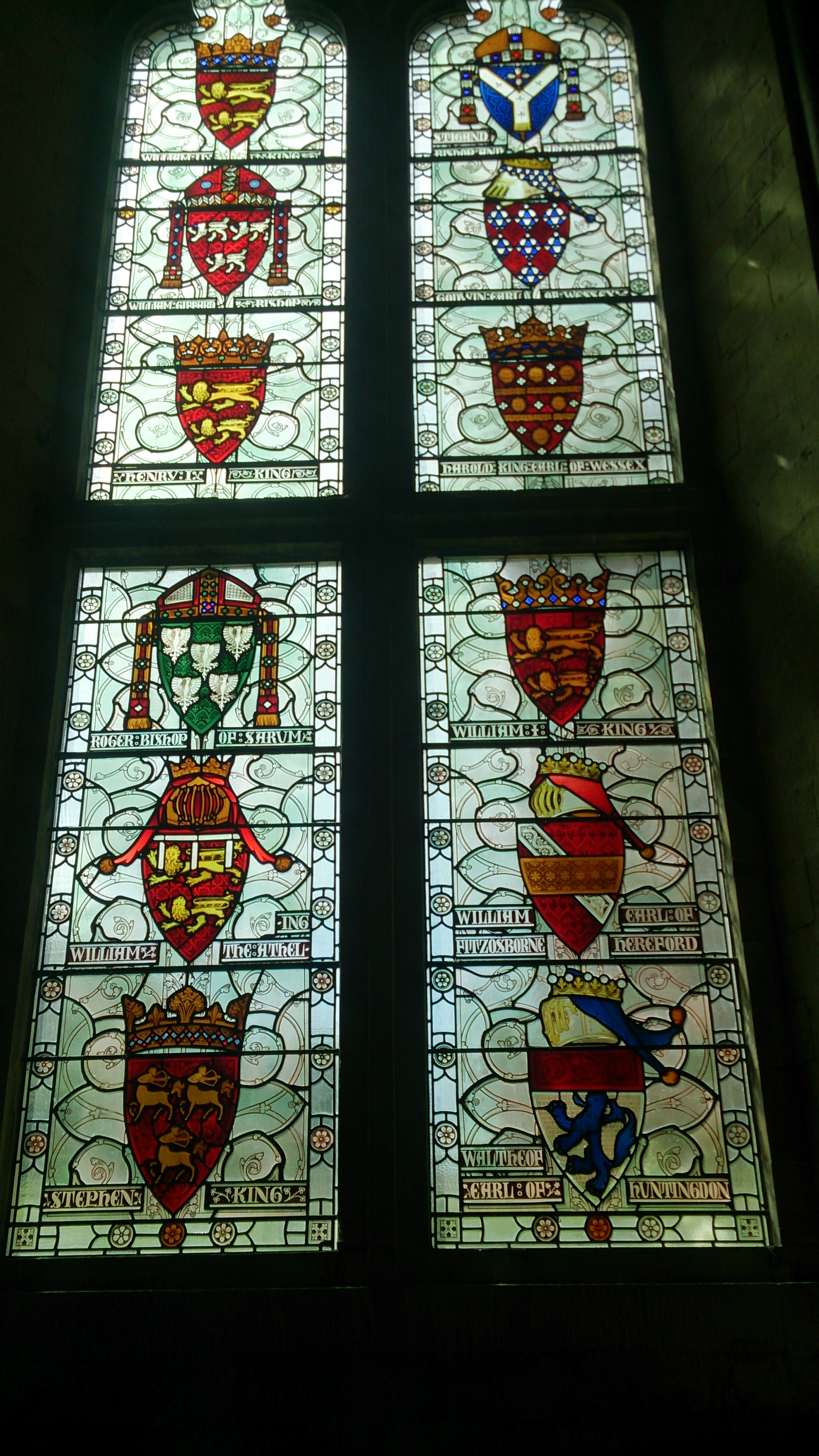
An armorial window in the Great Hall

In 1302, Edward I and his second wife, Margaret of France, narrowly escaped death when the royal apartments of the castle were destroyed by fire. Extensions to the castle were added by Edward II. On 19 March 1330, Edmund of Woodstock, 1st Earl of Kent was beheaded outside the castle walls in the Despenser plot against King Edward III. Repairs were conducted in the 1390s by master masons William Wynford and Henry Yevele. In the 15th century, the roof of the Great Hall was replaced, and the side gables were removed. The castle remained an important residence and on 10 April 1472 Margaret of York, daughter of King Edward IV, was born there.

After Elizabeth I came to the throne in 1558, the castle ceased to be a royal residence and was handed over to Winchester's city authorities. The Great Hall was maintained as a courtroom, a similar fate to other royal castles at the time. In 1580 the nun Elizabeth Sander was imprisoned here with other Catholics. She escaped but returned to show that Catholics were law abiding. On 17 November 1603 Sir Walter Raleigh was tried for treason for his supposed part in the Main Plot in the Great Hall.

The castle was used by the Royalists in the English Civil War, eventually falling to Parliamentarians in 1646, and then being demolished on Oliver Cromwell's orders in 1649. Later in the 17th century, Charles II began to build the King's House on the site, commissioning Christopher Wren to design a royal palace to rival the Palace of Versailles, but the project was abandoned by James II. It was in The Great Hall that, in the aftermath of the Monmouth Rebellion, Judge Jeffreys held the Bloody Assizes on 27 August 1685: the accused at Winchester included Alice Lisle who was condemned to death for harbouring fugitives.

Castle Hill, located nearby, is the location of the Council Chamber for Hampshire County Council and, since 2014, of the Winchester Register Office. The Great Hall was also the home of the Winchester Assizes and, in 1954, another notorious trial took place there, when Edward Montagu, Michael Pitt-Rivers and Peter Wildeblood went on trial and were convicted of charges of having committed specific acts of homosexual indecency. The Great Hall was also the venue of the trial and conviction of six members of the Provisional IRA, in 1973, for the Old Bailey bombing. The Great Hall ceased to be the venue for criminal trials after the Winchester Law Courts were erected, just to the east of the Great Hall, in 1974.

In 1963 the Winchester Excavation Committee began a rescue excavation at part of the site of the castle ahead of the planned construction of court buildings and associated car parks. Behind the Great Hall a medieval-style garden, called Queen Eleanor's Garden, was created in 1986. As of March 2024, the Great Hall was operated by Hampshire Cultural Trust, under the marketing name The Great Hall with Westgate Museum.

== Gallery ==
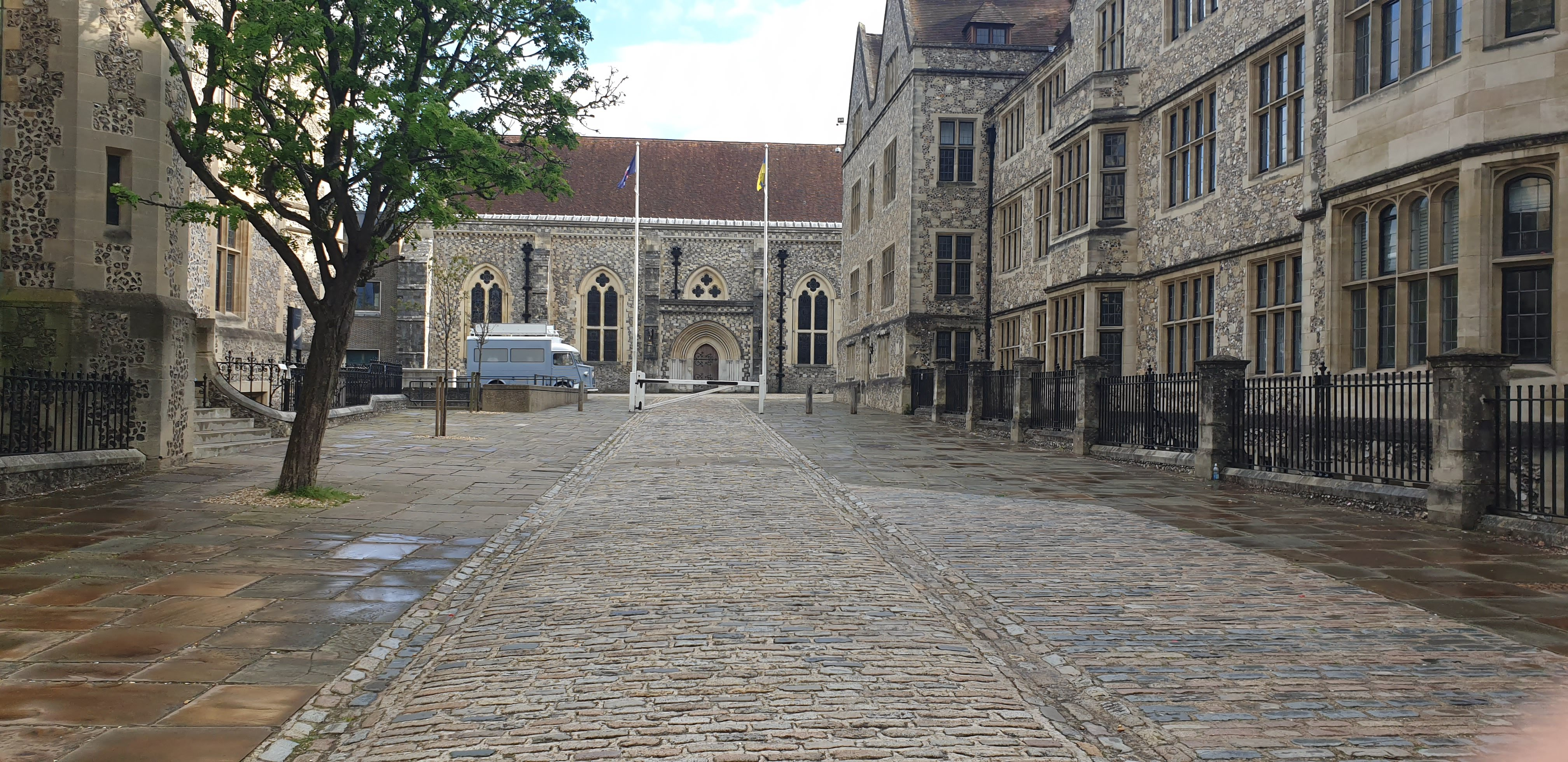
Castle Avenue, looking towards the Great Hall

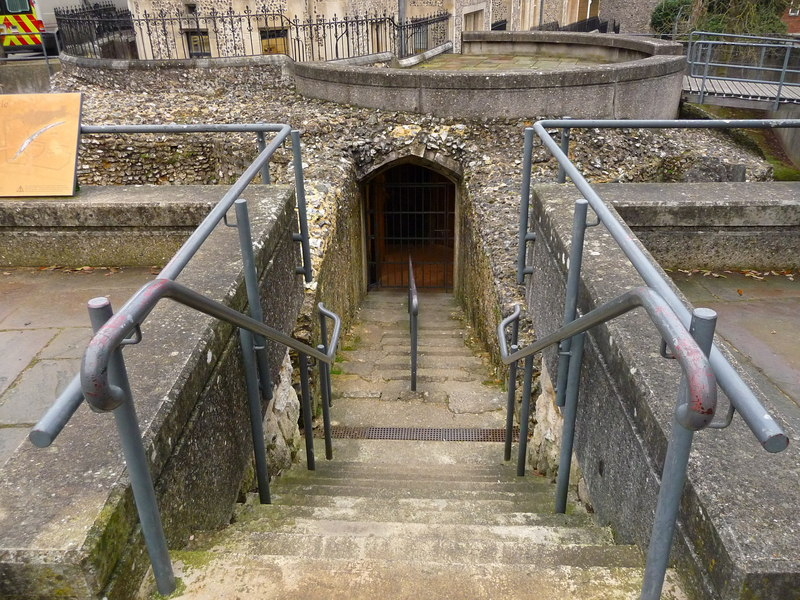
Underground passage of Winchester Castle

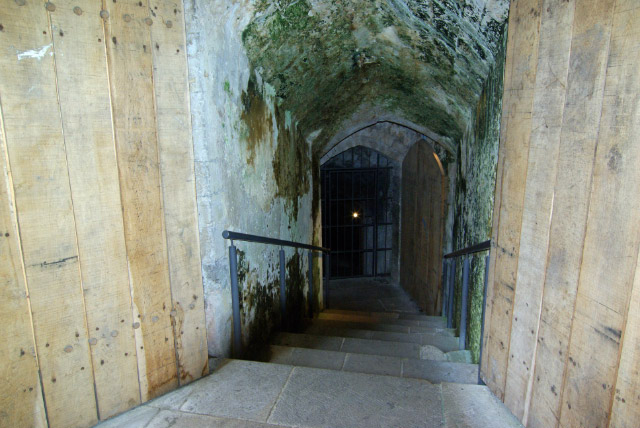
Passage descending into the cellar of the old Winchester Castle

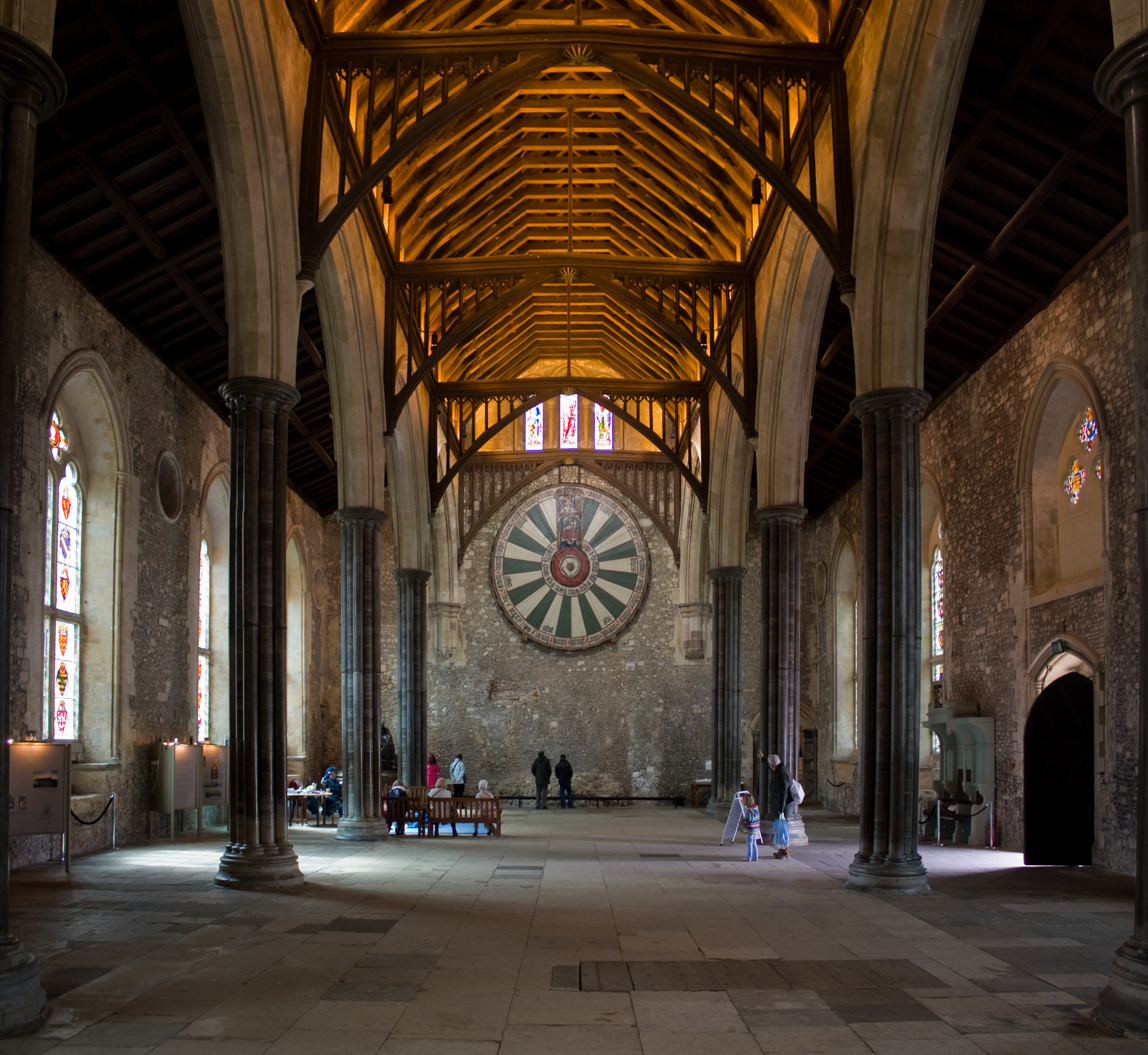
The interior of the Great Hall

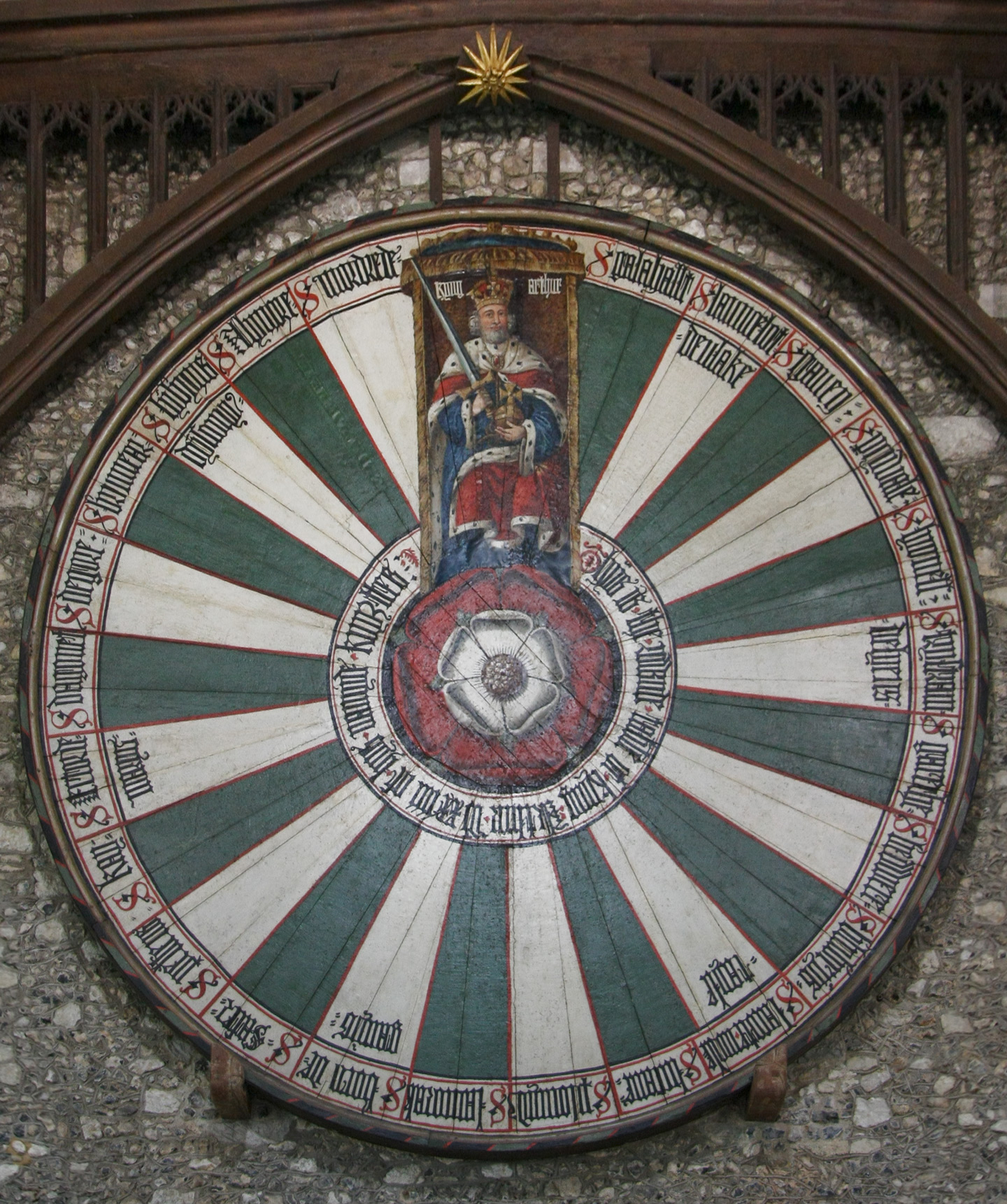
The "Winchester Round Table" in the Great Hall, Dendrochronology dating has placed it at 1250-80

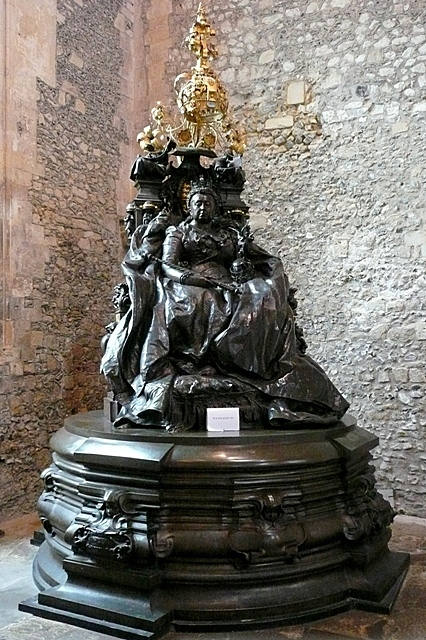
Statue of Queen Victoria in the Great Hall

== See also ==
- Castles in Great Britain and Ireland
- List of castles in England
- Three Castles Path

== Sources ==
- Biddle, Martin (1964). "Excavations at Winchester 1962–63: Second Interim Report". The Antiquaries Journal. 44 (2): 188–219. doi:10.1017/S0003581500018114.
- Biddle, Martin (1969). "Excavations at Winchester 1968: Seventh Interim Report". The Antiquaries Journal. 49 (2): 295–328. doi:10.1017/S0003581500053804.
- McKisack, May (1959). The Fourteenth Century: 1307–1399. Oxford: Oxford University Press. ISBN 0198217129.
- Kenyon, J.P. (1966). The Stuarts. Fontana.
- Rowse, A.L. (1962). Ralegh and the Throckmortons. Macmillan and Co.
