= Winchester city walls =

Historic walls in Winchester, UK

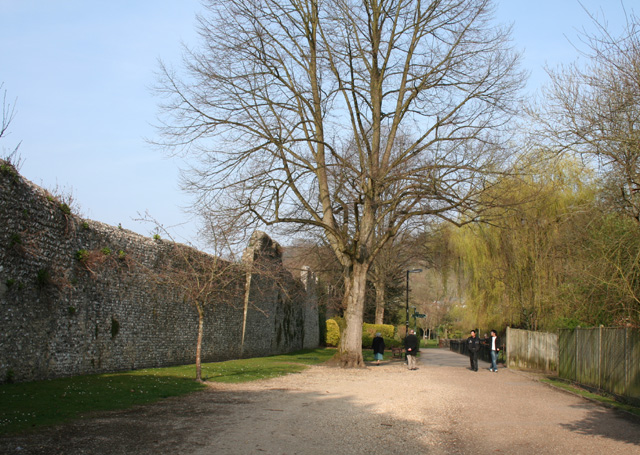
- Interactive map of Winchester city walls
- 51°03′48″N 1°18′29″W
- Location: Winchester, Hampshire, England

Site notes
- Area: 138 acres (56 ha)
- Owner: Winchester City Council

Listed Building – Grade I
- Official name: Winchester city walls and associated monuments
- Reference no.: 1001868

Winchester city walls are a series of defensive walls in central Winchester, originally built during the Roman settlement of southern Britain, in what was then the settlement of Venta Belgarum. The area surrounding Winchester had been populated throughout the Iron Age, with Britonnic settlements existing at Oram's Arbour, St Catherine's Hill, and Worthy Down; Venta Belgarum took its name from the Belgae tribes of the area. Earthwork defences were constructed around the end of the 2nd century AD, being rebuilt in stone during the latter part of the 3rd century.

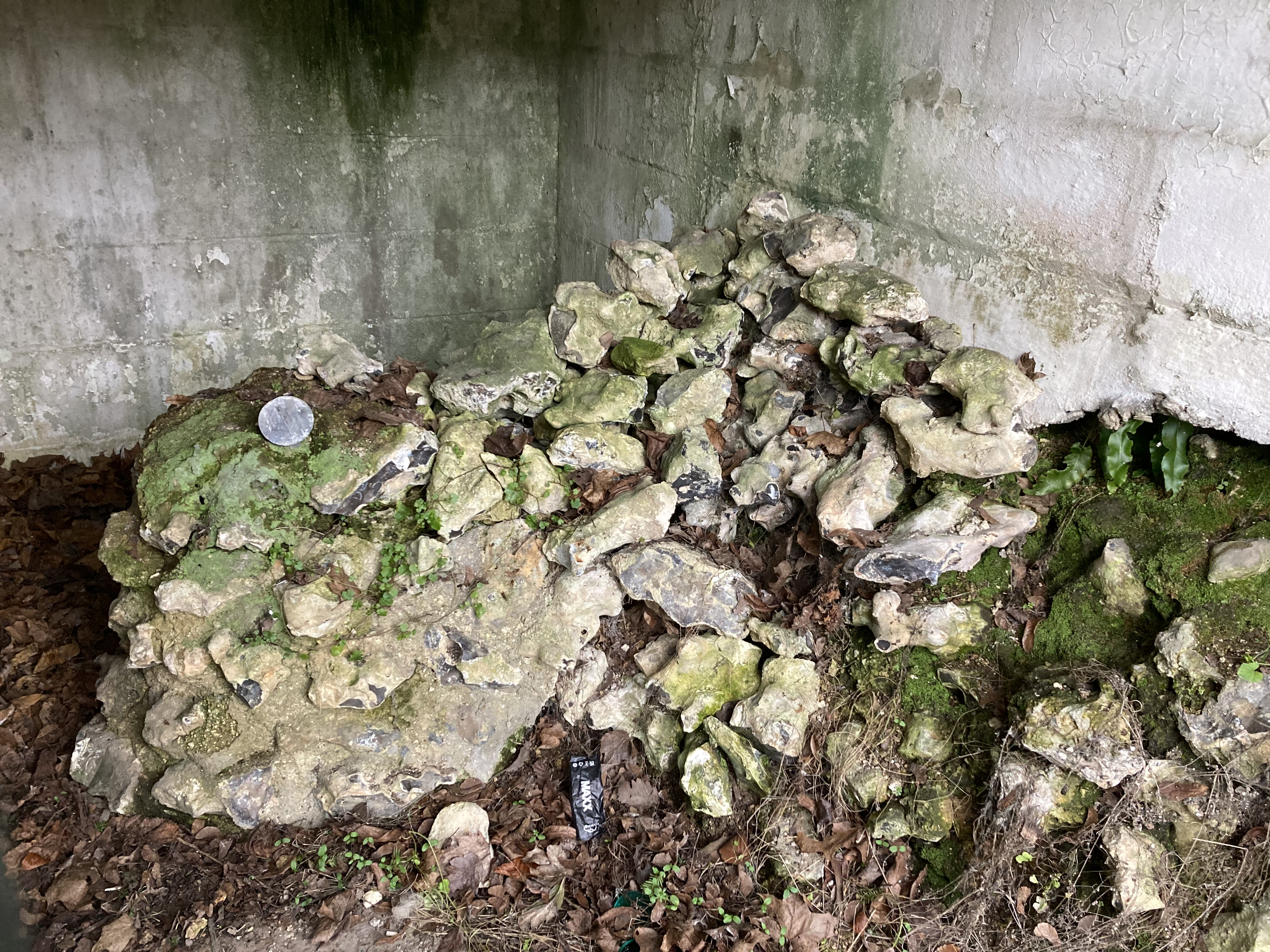
A small section of the Roman wall, dating from the 3rd century. This is the only remaining visible section

Under Saxon rule, Alfred the Great rebuilt Winchester and its defences as part of the burh system developed to protect against Norse incursions. Winchester was later chosen as the location of one of the first Norman castles in England, with Winchester Castle being built alongside the walls in 1067. As well as the royal castle in the West of the city, Wolvesey Castle, the palace of the Bishop of Winchester, was built in the East of the City alongside the River Itchen; during the Civil War known as The Anarchy, the forces of Queen Matilda, on behalf of King Stephen, besieged the forces of Empress Matilda, destroying much of the old city including the urban defences, in an event known as the Rout of Winchester.

Whilst Winchester's city walls went through periods of decline, by the 14th century, the city had 6 gates, the West Gate, South Gate, King's Gate, East Gate, North Gate and Durn Gate. In the English Civil War, the city was seized on behalf of the King by royalist Sir William Ogle, before being captured by Parliamentary forces led by Sir William Waller; the city was subsequently recovered by the Royalist forces before being recaptured by Parliament after the Battle of Cheriton, after which much of the castle was demolished, apart from the Great Hall.

During the 18th century, much of the walls and gates were demolished due to the relatively low height of the gates and their hazards to pedestrians, with the Eastgate demolished in 1768, and the Southgate demolished from 1771. The Northgate also collapsed in 1756. Today only the Kingsgate and Westgate survive, with other portions of the wall existing around the gates and Winchester Castle, as well as alongside the Itchen by the remains of Wolvesey Castle, with other sections having been demolished or repurposed. Sections of the wall remain as listed and protected areas.
