= Winchester =

City in Hampshire, England

- City
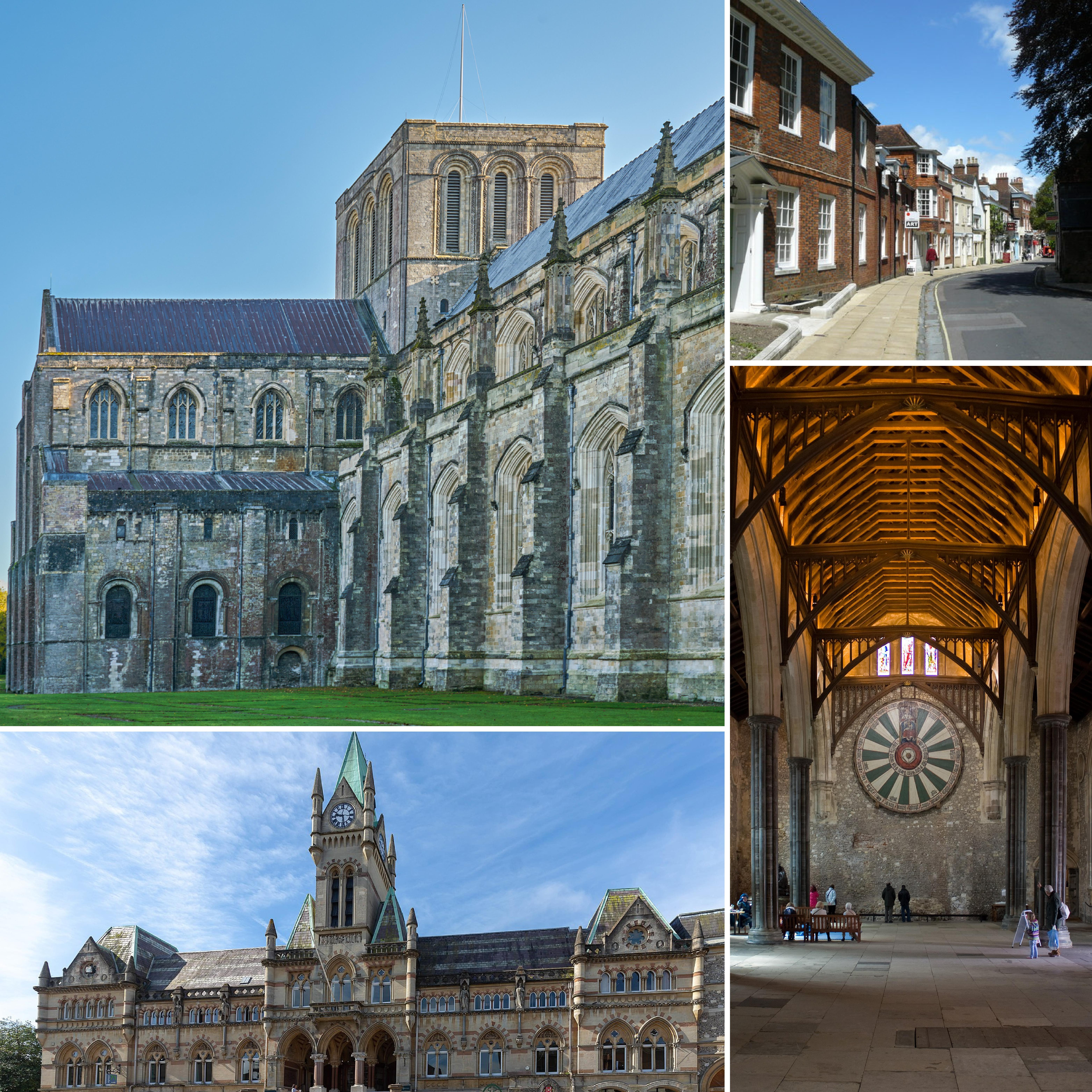
- Clockwise from top left: Winchester Cathedral, Great Minster Street, Great Hall of Winchester Castle and Winchester Guildhall

- Coat of arms of Winchester

- Location within Hampshire
- Population: 48,478
- OS grid reference: SU485295
  - London: 60 miles (97 km)
- District: Winchester
- Shire county: Hampshire
- Region: South East
- Country: England
- Sovereign state: United Kingdom
- Post town: WINCHESTER
- Postcode district: SO22, SO23
- Dialling code: 01962
- Police: Hampshire and Isle of Wight
- Fire: Hampshire and Isle of Wight
- Ambulance: South Central
- UK Parliament: Winchester

Winchester (/ˈwɪntʃɪstər/, /-tʃɛs-/) is a cathedral city in Hampshire, England. The city lies at the heart of the wider City of Winchester, a local government district, at the western end of the South Downs National Park, on the River Itchen. It is 60 miles (97 km) south-west of London and 14 miles (23 km) from Southampton, its nearest major city. At the 2021 census, the built-up area of Winchester had a population of 48,478. The wider City of Winchester district includes towns such as Alresford and Bishop's Waltham and had a population of 127,439 in 2021. Winchester is the county town of Hampshire and contains the head offices of Hampshire County Council.

Winchester developed from the Roman town of Venta Belgarum, which in turn developed from an Iron Age oppidum. Winchester was one of the most important cities in England in the Anglo-Saxon period.

The city's major landmark is Winchester Cathedral. The city is also home to Winchester College, the oldest public school in the United Kingdom still using its original buildings, the University of Winchester and Winchester School of Art, part of the faculty of arts and humanities at the University of Southampton.

== History ==
=== Prehistory ===
The area around Winchester has been inhabited since prehistoric times, with three Iron Age hillforts, Oram's Arbour, St. Catherine's Hill, and Worthy Down all nearby. In the Late Iron Age, a more urban settlement type developed, known as an oppidum, although the archaeology of this phase remains obscure.

The settlement became an important centre for the British Belgae tribe; however, it remains unclear how the Belgae came to control the initial settlement. Caesar recorded the tribe had crossed the channel as raiders (probably in the 1st century BCE), only to later establish themselves. The Roman account of continental invaders has been challenged in recent years with scientific studies favouring a gradual change through increased trade links rather than migration.

To the Celtic Britons, the settlement was probably known as Wentā or Venta (from a common Celtic word meaning "tribal town" or "meeting place"). An etymology connected with the Celtic word for "white" (Modern Welsh gwyn) has been suggested, due to Winchester's situation upon chalk. It was the Latinised versions of this name, together with that of the tribe, that gave the town its Roman name of Venta Belgarum.

=== Roman period ===
After the Roman conquest of Britain, the settlement served as the capital (Latin: civitas) of the Belgae and was distinguished as Venta Belgarum, "Venta of the Belgae". Although in the early years of the Roman province it was of subsidiary importance to Silchester and Chichester, Venta eclipsed them both by the latter half of the second century. At the beginning of the third century, Winchester was given protective stone walls. At around this time the city covered an area of 144 acres (58 ha), making it among the largest towns in Roman Britain by surface area. There was a limited suburban area outside the walls. Like many other Roman towns, however, Winchester began to decline in the later fourth century.

=== Post-Roman ===
Despite the Roman withdrawal from Britain, urban life continued much as it had done into the mid fifth century. The settlement was reduced in size, but work was carried out to improve the city's defences. The city may have functioned as a centre for a religious community or a royal palace, as they continued to use the Christian cemeteries established in the Roman period.

Winchester appears in early Welsh literature and is commonly identified as the city of Cair Guinntguic listed among the 28 cities of Britain in the History of the Britons (commonly attributed to Nennius). The city is known as Caerwynt in Modern Welsh.

Between 476 and 517 AD, the town and surrounding areas seem to have been fortified by several Jutish settlements (Note: At Kings Worthy, Abbots Worthy, Martyrs Worthy, Itchen Abbas and Itchen Stoke.) and to have operated as part of a larger polity.

=== Anglo-Saxon ===
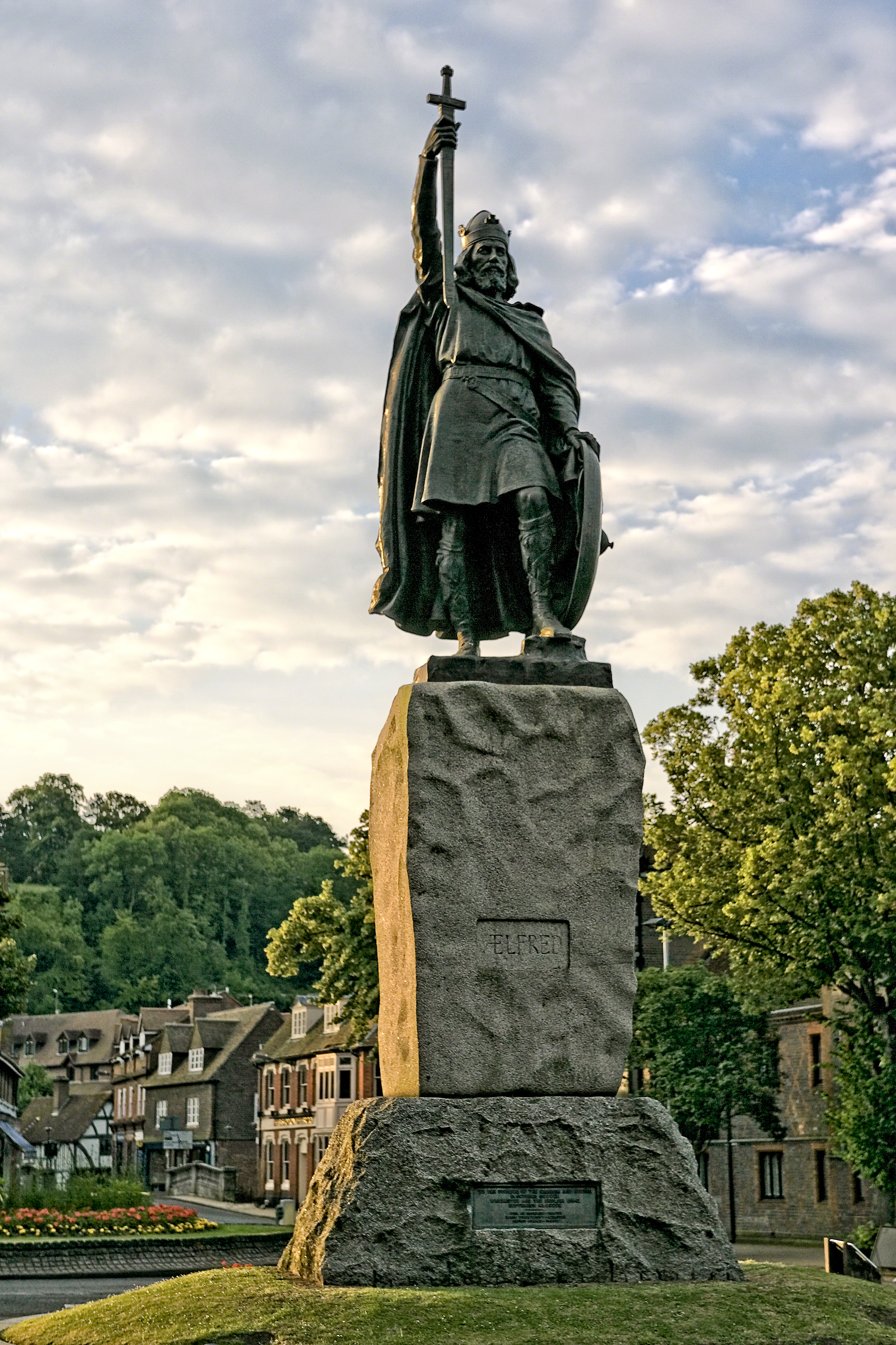
Statue of Alfred the Great by Hamo Thornycroft in Winchester

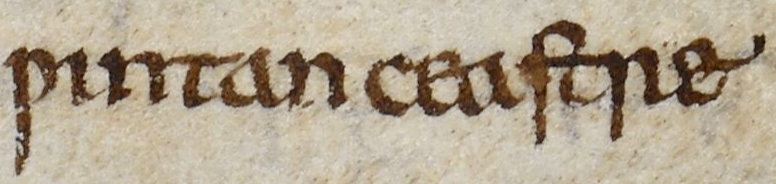
A mention of Wintanceaster (here spelled Ƿintan ceastre) in the Anglo-Saxon Chronicle

The city became known as Wintanceaster ("Fort Venta") in Old English. In 648, King Cenwalh of Wessex erected the Church of St Peter and St Paul, later known as the Old Minster. This became a cathedral in the 660s when the West Saxon bishop's see was transferred from Dorchester on Thames. The present form of the city dates from reconstruction in the late 9th century, when King Alfred the Great obliterated the Roman street plan in favour of a new grid in order to provide better defence against the Vikings. The city's first mint appears to date from this period.

In the early 10th century there were two new ecclesiastical establishments: the convent of Nunnaminster, founded by Alfred's widow Ealhswith, and the New Minster. Bishop Æthelwold of Winchester was a leading figure in the monastic reform movement of the later 10th century. He expelled the secular canons of both minsters and replaced them with monks. He created the drainage system, the "Lockburn", which served as the town drain until 1875, and still survives. Also in the late 10th century, the Old Minster was enlarged as a centre of the cult of the 9th century Bishop of Winchester, Saint Swithun. The three minsters were the home of what architectural historian John Crook describes as "the supreme artistic achievements" of the Winchester School.

The consensus among historians of Anglo-Saxon England is that the court was mobile in this period and there was no fixed capital. Martin Biddle has suggested that Winchester was a centre for royal administration in the 7th and 8th centuries, but this is questioned by Barbara Yorke, who sees it as significant that the shire was named after Hamtun, the forerunner of Southampton. However, Winchester is described by the historian Catherine Cubitt as "the premier city of the West Saxon kingdom" and Janet Nelson describes London and Winchester as Alfred the Great's "proto-capitals".

=== High and later Middle Ages ===
There was a fire in the city in 1141 during the Rout of Winchester. In the 14th century, William of Wykeham played a role in the city's restoration. As Bishop of Winchester he was responsible for much of the current structure of the cathedral, and he founded the extant public school Winchester College. During the Middle Ages, the city was an important centre of the wool trade, before going into a slow decline. The curfew bell in the bell tower (near the clock in the picture), still sounds at 8:00 pm each evening.

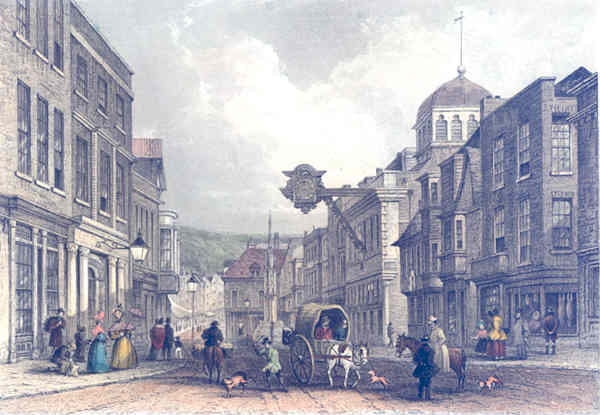
Winchester High Street in the mid 19th century.

Jews lived in Winchester from at least 1148, and in the 13th century the Jewish community in the city was one of the most important in England. There was an archa in the city, and the Jewish quarter was located in the city's heart (present day Jewry street). There were a series of blood libel claims against the Jewish community in the 1220s and 1230s, which was probably the cause of the hanging of the community's leader, Abraham Pinch, in front of the synagogue of which he was the head. Simon de Montfort ransacked the Jewish quarter in 1264, and in 1290 all Jews were expelled from England. A statue of Licoricia of Winchester, described as "the most important Jewish woman in medieval England", located in Jewry Street, was unveiled by the then Prince of Wales on 10 February 2022.

=== Modern period ===
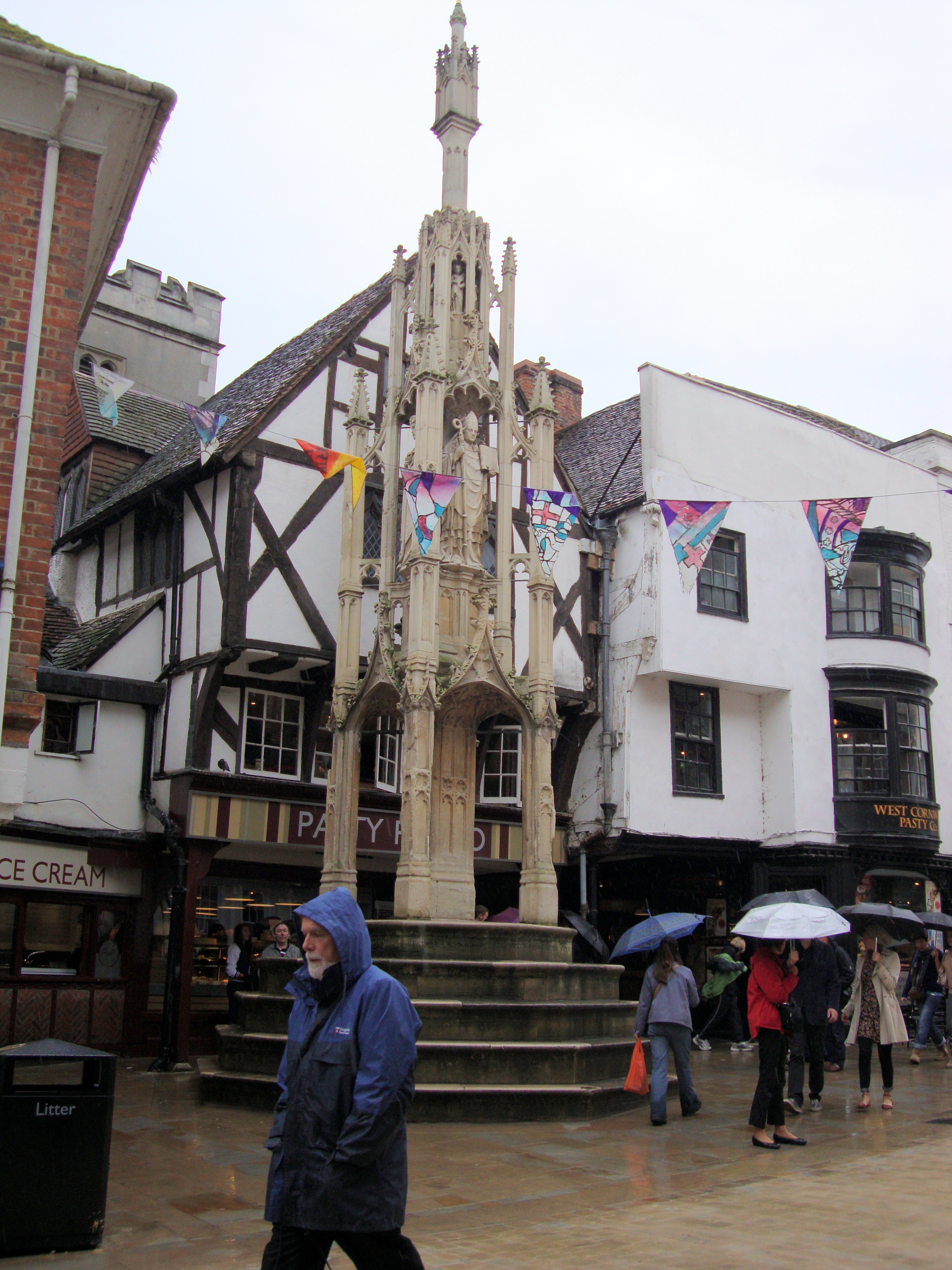
The Winchester Buttercross

The City Cross (also known as the Buttercross) has been dated to the 15th century, and features 12 statues of the Virgin Mary, other saints and various historical figures. Several statues appear to have been added throughout the structure's history. In 1770, Thomas Dummer purchased the Buttercross from the Corporation of Winchester, intending to have it re-erected at Cranbury Park, near Otterbourne. When his workmen arrived to dismantle the cross, they were prevented from doing so by the people of the city, who "organised a small riot", and they were forced to abandon their task. The agreement with the city was cancelled and Dummer erected a lath and plaster facsimile, which stood in the park for about sixty years before it was destroyed by the weather. The Buttercross itself was restored by George Gilbert Scott in 1865, and still stands in the High Street. It is now a Scheduled Ancient Monument.

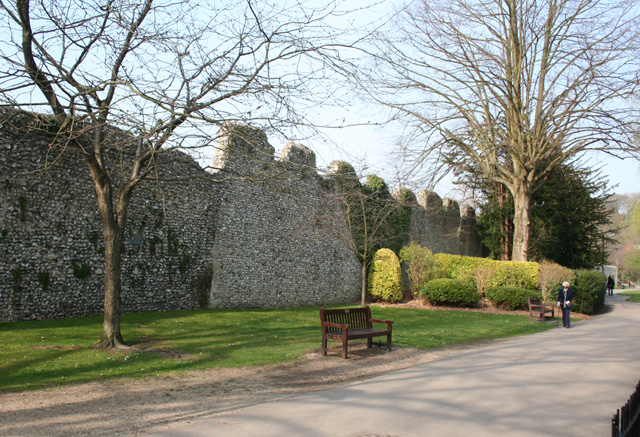
Surviving part of the city walls between Wolvesey Castle and the River Itchen. This section retains some battlements.

The city walls were originally built in the Roman period covering an area of around 138 acres (56 ha), and were rebuilt and expanded in sections over time. A large portion of the city walls, built on Roman foundations, were demolished in the 18th and 19th centuries as they fell into ruin and the gates became a barrier to traffic and a danger to pedestrians, with only a small portion of the original Roman wall itself surviving. Of the six gates (North, South, East, West, Durn, and King's Gates), only the Kingsgate and Westgate survive, with sections of the walls remaining around the two gates and near the ruins of Wolvesey Castle.

Three notable bronze sculptures can be seen in or from the High Street by major sculptors of the 19th and 20th centuries, the earliest a monumental statue of Queen Victoria, now in the Great hall, by Sir Alfred Gilbert (also known as the sculptor of 'Eros' in London's Piccadilly Circus), King Alfred, facing the city with raised sword from the centre of The Broadway, by Hamo Thornycroft and the modern striking Horse and Rider by Dame Elizabeth Frink at the entrance to the Law Courts.

The novelist Jane Austen died in Winchester on 18 July 1817 and is buried in the cathedral. While staying in Winchester from mid-August to October 1819, the Romantic poet John Keats wrote "Isabella", "St. Agnes' Eve", "To Autumn", "Lamia" and parts of "Hyperion" and the five-act poetic tragedy "Otho The Great".

In 2013, businesses involved in the housing market were reported by a local newspaper as saying that the city's architectural and historical interest, and its fast links to other towns and cities, had led Winchester to become one of the most expensive and desirable areas of the country and ranked Winchester as one of the least deprived areas in England and Wales.

== Geography ==
Winchester is situated on a bed of Cretaceous lower chalk with small areas of clay and loam soil, inset with combined clay and rich sources of fuller's earth.

=== Climate ===
As with the rest of the UK, Winchester experiences an oceanic climate (Köppen Cfb). The nearest Met Office station is in Martyr Worthy, just outside the city.

Climate data for Martyr Worthy, (Note: Weather station is located 4.0 miles (6.4 km) from the Winchester city centre.) (1991–2020 normals, extremes 1959–2002)
| Month | Jan | Feb | Mar | Apr | May | Jun | Jul | Aug | Sep | Oct | Nov | Dec | Year |
|---|---|---|---|---|---|---|---|---|---|---|---|---|---|
| Record high °C (°F) | 14.0 (57.2) | 16.1 (61.0) | 20.0 (68.0) | 23.5 (74.3) | 27.8 (82.0) | 34.0 (93.2) | 33.5 (92.3) | 34.7 (94.5) | 28.3 (82.9) | 26.1 (79.0) | 18.3 (64.9) | 14.8 (58.6) | 34.7 (94.5) |
| Mean daily maximum °C (°F) | 7.8 (46.0) | 8.4 (47.1) | 11.1 (52.0) | 14.2 (57.6) | 17.9 (64.2) | 20.5 (68.9) | 22.9 (73.2) | 22.6 (72.7) | 19.7 (67.5) | 15.2 (59.4) | 10.9 (51.6) | 8.3 (46.9) | 15.0 (58.9) |
| Daily mean °C (°F) | 4.7 (40.5) | 4.9 (40.8) | 6.9 (44.4) | 9.2 (48.6) | 12.4 (54.3) | 15.1 (59.2) | 17.2 (63.0) | 17.2 (63.0) | 14.6 (58.3) | 11.3 (52.3) | 7.5 (45.5) | 5.1 (41.2) | 10.5 (50.9) |
| Mean daily minimum °C (°F) | 1.5 (34.7) | 1.4 (34.5) | 2.7 (36.9) | 4.2 (39.6) | 6.9 (44.4) | 9.6 (49.3) | 11.5 (52.7) | 11.8 (53.2) | 9.5 (49.1) | 7.3 (45.1) | 4.0 (39.2) | 1.9 (35.4) | 6.0 (42.8) |
| Record low °C (°F) | −13.0 (8.6) | −10.7 (12.7) | −9.4 (15.1) | −6.1 (21.0) | −4.1 (24.6) | −0.7 (30.7) | 2.8 (37.0) | −0.1 (31.8) | −0.1 (31.8) | −4.7 (23.5) | −8.6 (16.5) | −11.8 (10.8) | −13.0 (8.6) |
| Average precipitation mm (inches) | 81.6 (3.21) | 57.6 (2.27) | 50.9 (2.00) | 50.9 (2.00) | 49.2 (1.94) | 45.2 (1.78) | 52.9 (2.08) | 57.8 (2.28) | 54.6 (2.15) | 86.0 (3.39) | 91.4 (3.60) | 75.6 (2.98) | 753.6 (29.67) |
| Average precipitation days (≥ 1.0 mm) | 12.7 | 10.2 | 9.3 | 9.7 | 8.6 | 8.4 | 9.0 | 9.0 | 8.9 | 11.7 | 12.9 | 12.5 | 123.0 |
| Mean monthly sunshine hours | 57.1 | 80.2 | 115.8 | 168.4 | 199.5 | 190.6 | 201.5 | 186.4 | 146.7 | 108.5 | 69.6 | 55.2 | 1,579.3 |
Source 1: Met Office
Source 2: Starlings Roost Weather

== Demography ==
Between the last two censuses (held in 2011 and 2021), the population of the wider City of Winchester district increased by 9.3%, from just under 116,600 in 2011 to around 127,400 in 2021.

== Governance ==
Winchester Town Forum
- Coat of arms or logo
- City wards in dark red; parished part of St Barnabas in light red

Type
- Type: Area Committee

Leadership
- Chair: Cllr Chris Westwood

Structure
- Seats: 14
- Liberal Democrats: 14 / 14

Elections
- Voting system: Indirect election, ex officio ward councillors from town wards

Meeting place
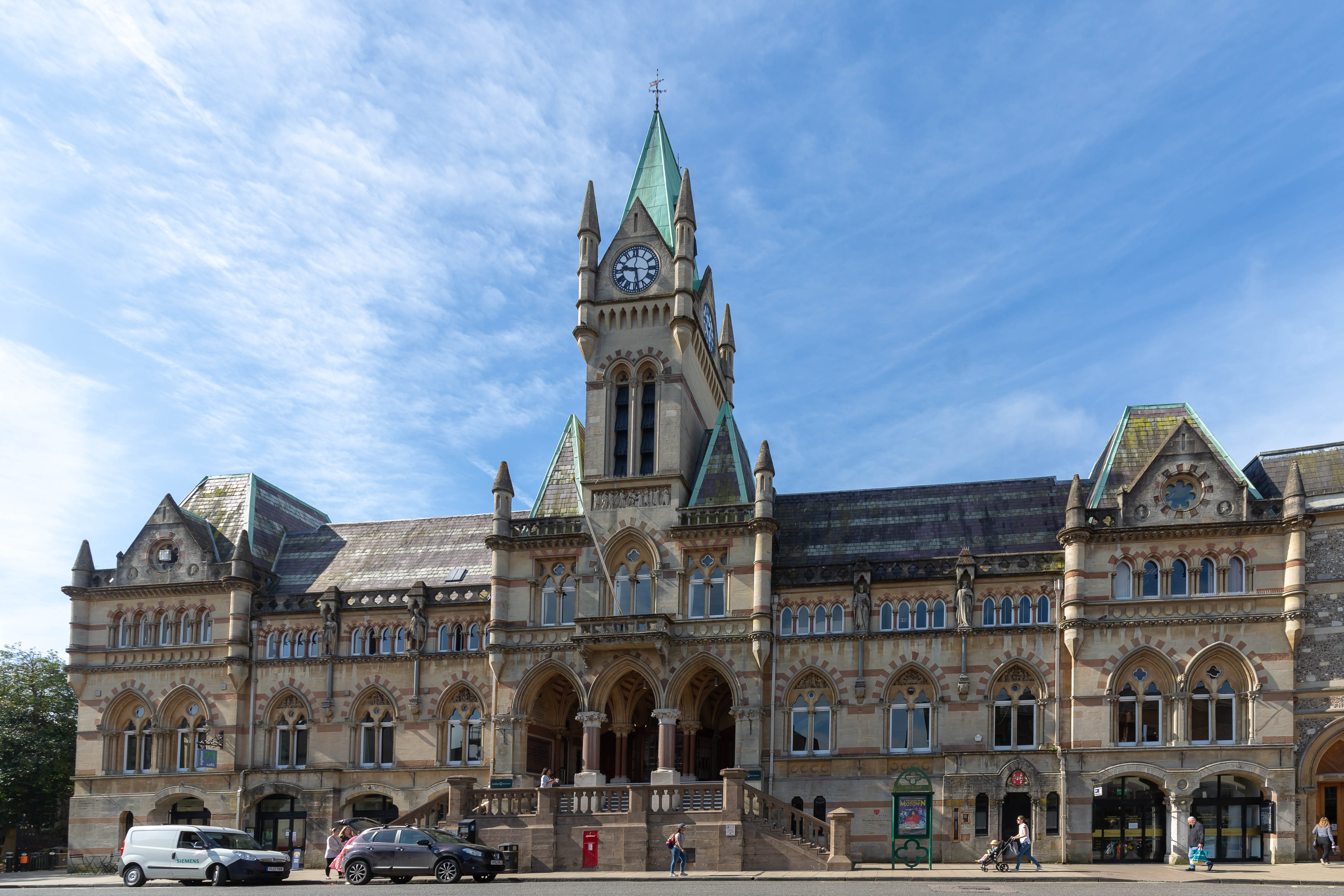
- Guildhall, The Broadway, High Street, Winchester, SO23 9GH

From 1835 to 1974, Winchester was governed as a municipal borough of Hampshire. Until 1902 the city's affairs were also administered partly by its parishes: St Lawrence, St Mary Kalendar, St Maurice, St Michael, St Peter Colebrook, St Swithin, St Thomas, St John, St Bartholomew Hyde, Milland, St Faith, and St Peter Cheesehill, and its extra-parochial areas: Cathedral Precincts, St Mary's College Precincts, St Cross Hospital Precinct, and Wolvesey. Historically, the south of the city had come under the "Liberty of the Soke", and was thereby self-governing to a large extent.

In 1889, the city came under the new Hampshire County Council, and the city was later administered by Winchester Urban District. Since 1974 the area has been governed as part of the wider City of Winchester district of Hampshire. The district has 16 electoral wards, five of these cover the former Urban District itself: St Barnabas, St Paul, St Luke, St Bartholomew, and St Michael; they have three councillors each apart from St Luke, which is a two-member ward. For Hampshire County Council elections, the City of Winchester district is made up of 7 divisions, with Winchester Westgate and Winchester Eastgate covering the town area.

Whilst the remainder of the district is parished, most of the five city wards constitutes an unparished area. As a result, they now make up Winchester Town Forum, which matches the former Winchester Urban District. Legally an area committee, it oversees the Town account and acts as a council committee to steer some decisions affecting the town. Unlike parishes, members are not directly-elected, but instead are the city councillors who were elected to the respective wards, who sit ex officio on the town forum.

In 2025, in response to Local Government Reorganisation, Winchester Town Forum requested a Community Governance Review be undertaken for the unparished part of the city, as well as some surrounding areas, namely Harestock, Olivers Battery, Badger Farm, and Kings Barton.

The current ward boundaries were adopted in 2016, when all seats were up for election. Since then, Winchester City Council elections take place in three out of every four years, with one third of the councillors elected in each election. From the 2006 election until the 2010 election the council was led by Conservatives. In 2010 it was controlled for a year by the Liberal Democrats, before being led again by the Conservatives from 2011 until 2019, since when the Liberal Democrats have again been in control. The wards are:

- St Barnabas (part under Littleton and Harestock Parish)
- St Bartholomew
- St Luke
- St Michael
- St Paul

St Barnabas predominantly covers Harestock, Weeke and Teg Down. Harestock is part of Littleton and Harestock Parish whilst the remainder is part of the unparished area, but the entire ward is part of the Town Forum. The remaining wards are all completely unparished; St Bartholomew is predominantly composed of Abbotts Barton, Hyde, and Winnall; St Luke is predominantly composed of Stanmore and Winchester Village; St Michael is predominantly composed of Bar End, Highcliffe, Saint Giles Hill, St Cross, and much of the city centre including the Cathedral Close; St Pauls is predominantly composed of Fulflood, Sleepers Hill, and West Hill.

Winchester is currently represented in the House of Commons by Danny Chambers, of the Liberal Democrats, who in the 2024 General Election beat Flick Drummond, the Conservative candidate, by 13,821 votes (a margin of 24.2%).

The office of Mayor of Winchester currently exists as a ceremonial role, but dates back at least as far as the late 12th century. The mayoral term length is currently one year, and is the chair of Winchester City Council, covering the wider district since 1974.

== Landmarks ==
=== Cathedral ===
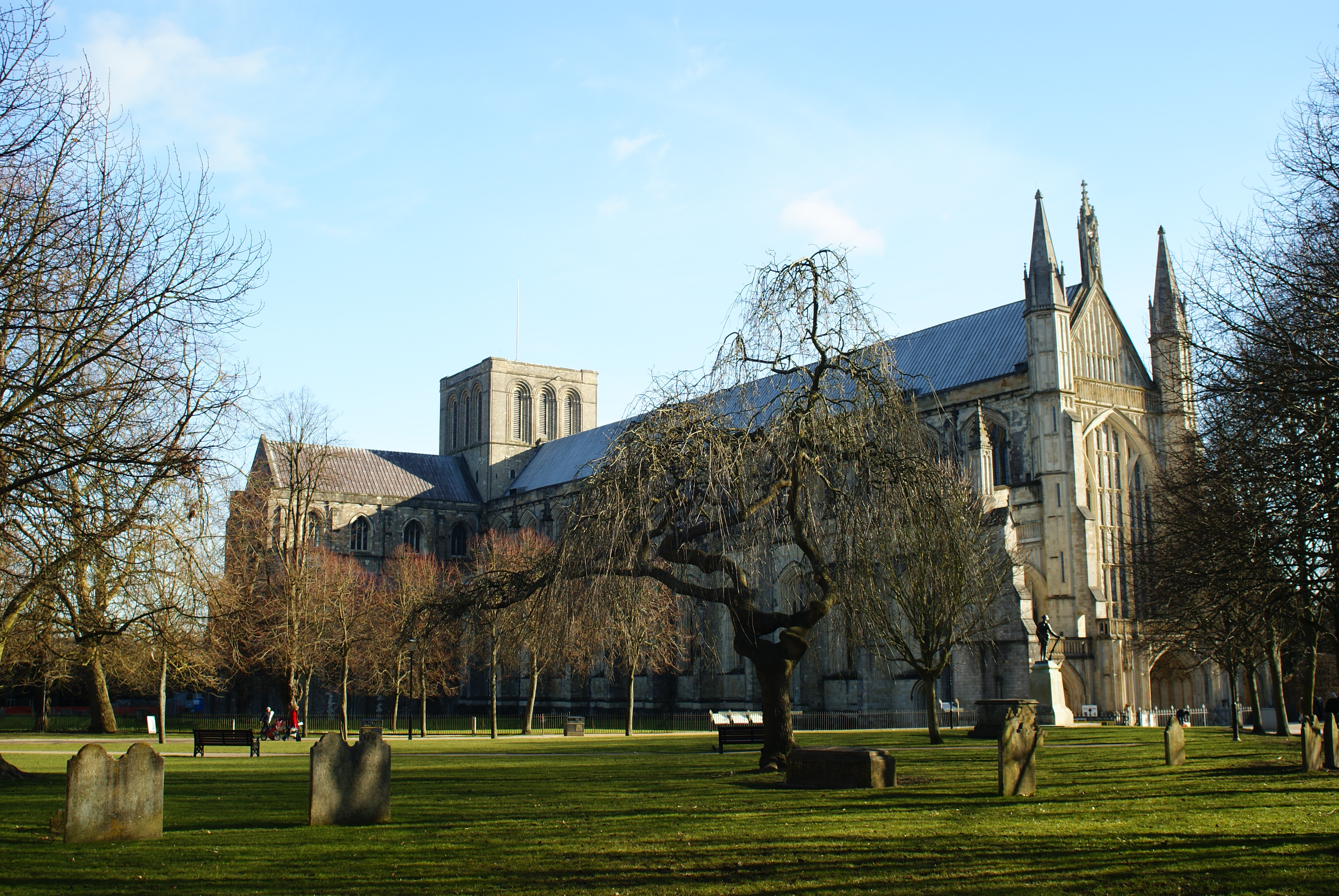
Winchester Cathedral, showing its long nave

Winchester Cathedral was originally built in 1079 and remains the longest Gothic cathedral in Europe. It contains much fine architecture spanning the 11th to the 16th centuries and is the place of interment of numerous Bishops of Winchester (such as William of Wykeham), Anglo-Saxon monarchs (such as Egbert of Wessex) and later monarchs such as King Canute and William Rufus. It was once an important pilgrimage centre and housed the shrine of Saint Swithun. The ancient Pilgrims' Way to Canterbury begins at Winchester. The plan of the earlier Old Minster is laid out in the grass adjoining the cathedral. The New Minster (the original burial place of Alfred the Great and Edward the Elder) once stood beside it. The cathedral has a girls choir and a boys choir, who sing regularly in the cathedral.

Winchester Cathedral Close contains a number of historic buildings from the time when the cathedral was also a priory. Of particular note is the Deanery, which dates back to the 13th century. It was originally the Prior's House, and was the birthplace of Arthur, Prince of Wales in 1486. Not far away is Cheyney Court, a mid 15th-century timber-framed house incorporating the Porter's Lodge for the Priory Gate. It was the Bishop's court house.

The earliest hammer-beamed building still standing in England is situated in the Cathedral Close, next to the Dean's garden. It is known as the Pilgrims' Hall, as it was part of the hostelry used to accommodate the many pilgrims to Saint Swithun's shrine. Left-overs from the lavish banquets of the Priors (the monastic predecessors of the later Deans) would be given to the pilgrims, who were welcome to spend the night in the hall. It is thought by Winchester City Council to have been built in 1308. Now part of The Pilgrims' School, the hall is used by the school for assemblies in the morning, drama lessons, plays, orchestral practices, Cathedral Waynflete rehearsals, the school's Senior Commoners' Choir rehearsals etc.

Entrance for pedestrians to the North garth of the cathedral is via the Norman arches of Saint Maurice's tower, in the High Street.

=== Wolvesey Castle and Palace ===
Wolvesey Castle was the Norman bishop's palace, dating from 1110, but standing on the site of an earlier Saxon structure. It was enhanced by Henry de Blois during the Anarchy of his brother King Stephen's reign. He was besieged there for some days. In the 16th century, Queen Mary Tudor and King Philip II of Spain were guests just before their wedding in the cathedral. The building is now a ruin (maintained by English Heritage), but the chapel was incorporated into the new palace built in the 1680s, only one wing of which survives.

=== Castle ===
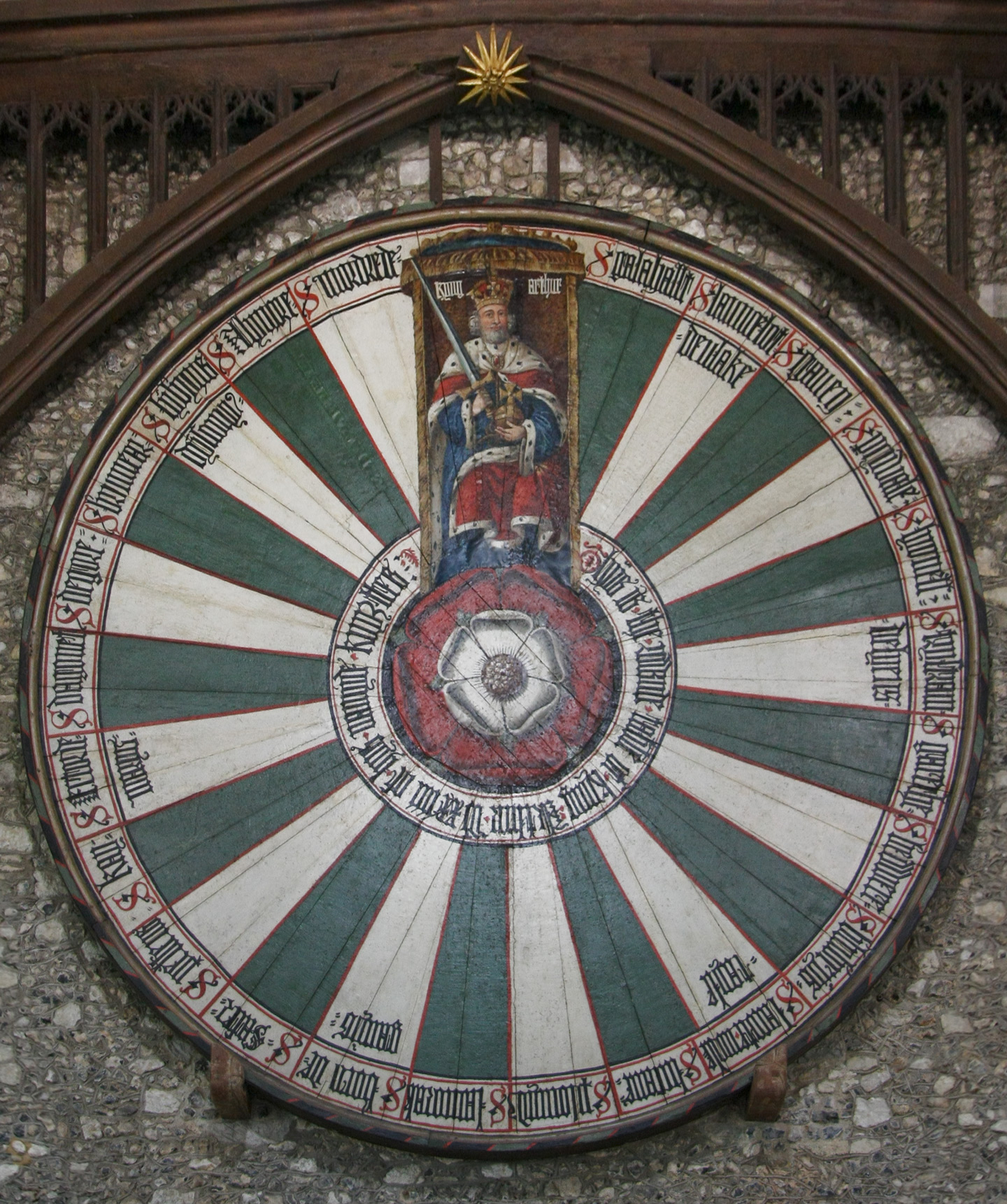
The Winchester Round Table in the Great Hall of Winchester Castle

Winchester is well known for the Great Hall of its castle, which was built in the 12th century. The Great Hall was rebuilt sometime between 1222 and 1235, and still exists in this form. It is famous for King Arthur's Round Table, which has hung in the hall from at least 1463. The table actually dates from the 13th century, this it is still of considerable historical interest and attracts many tourists. The table was originally unpainted, but was painted for Henry VIII in 1522. The names of the legendary Knights of the Round Table are written around the edge of the table surmounted by King Arthur on his throne. Opposite the table are Prince Charles's 'Wedding Gates'. In the grounds of the Great Hall is a recreation of a medieval garden. Apart from the hall, only a few excavated remains of the stronghold survive among the modern Law Courts. The buildings were supplanted by the adjacent King's House, now incorporated into the Peninsula Barracks where there are five military museums. (The training that used to be carried out at the barracks is now done by the Army Training Regiment Winchester, based at the Sir John Moore Barracks, 2 miles (3 km) outside the city).

=== Hospital of St Cross ===
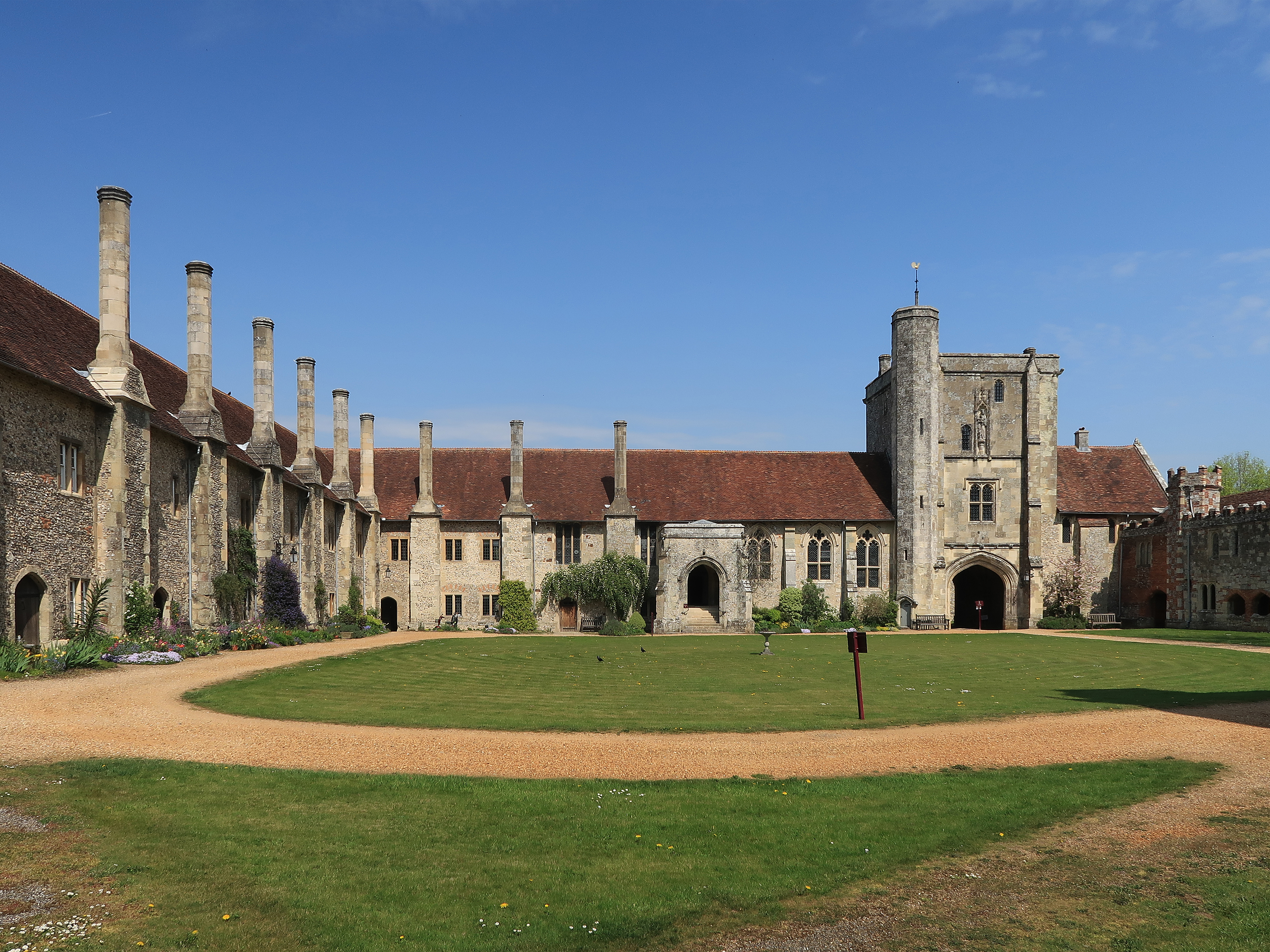
Hospital of St Cross, Winchester

The almshouses and vast Norman chapel of the Hospital of St Cross were founded just outside the city centre by Henry de Blois in the 1130s. Since at least the 14th century, and still available today, a 'wayfarer's dole' of ale and bread has been handed out there. It was supposedly instigated to aid pilgrims on their way to Canterbury.

=== City museum ===
The City Museum, located on the corner of Great Minster Street and The Square, contains much information on the history of Winchester. Early examples of Winchester measures of standard capacity are on display. The museum was one of the first purpose-built museums to be constructed outside London. Local items featured include the Roman Venta Belgarum gallery, and some genuine period shop interiors taken from the nearby High Street. Other places of cultural interest include the Westgate Museum (which showcases various items of weaponry), and the Historic Resources Centre, which holds many records related to the history of the city. In 2014 ownership of the City museum was transferred to the Hampshire Cultural Trust as part of a larger transfer of museums from Hampshire County Council and Winchester City Council.

=== Other buildings ===
Other historic buildings include the Guildhall dating from 1871 in the Gothic revival style, the Royal Hampshire County Hospital, designed by William Butterfield, and Winchester City Mill, one of the city's several water mills driven by the River Itchen that runs through the city centre. The mill has recently been restored, and is again milling corn by water power. It is owned by the National Trust.

Castle Hill is the location of the Council Chamber for Hampshire County Council.

Between Jewry Street and St Peter's Street is St Peter's Catholic Church. It was built in 1924 and designed by Frederick Walters. Next to it is Milner Hall, built in the 1780s, which was the first Catholic church to be consecrated since 1558.

The old Victorian Corn Exchange is now used as a cultural hub.

The Wessex Hotel on Paternoster Row, designed by architect Bernard Feilden in a modernist style and opened in 1964, features a glass screen installed in the foyer depicting 12 "Green Man" heads designed by John Piper and manufactured by Patrick Reyntiens.

=== Painted bollards ===
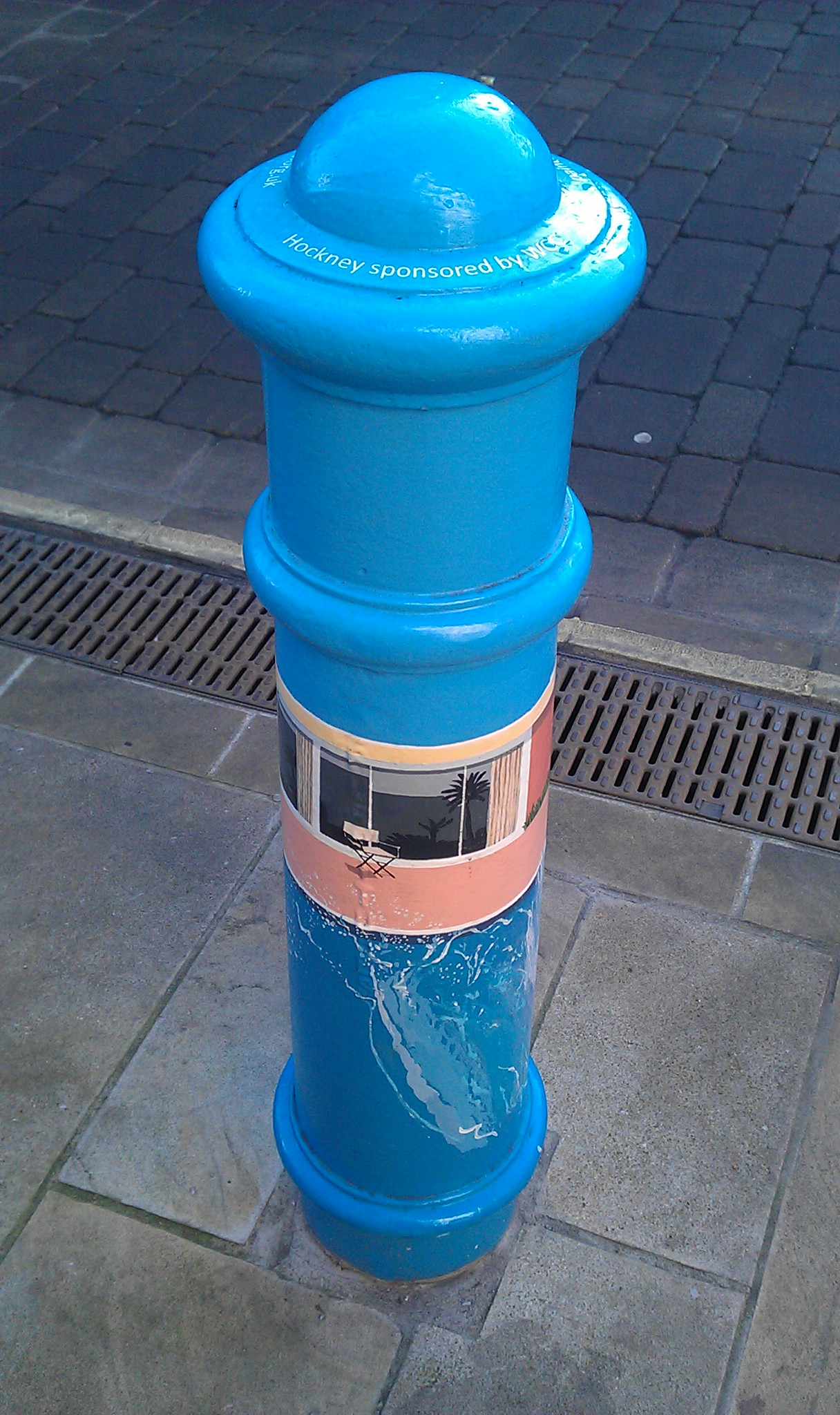
Bollard in the style of David Hockney's A Bigger Splash

A series of 24 bollards on the corner of Great Minster Street and The Square were painted in the style of famous artists, or with topical scenes, by The Colour Factory between 2005 and 2012 at the behest of Winchester City Council.(51.062°N 1.31525°W)

== Education ==
=== State-funded schools ===
==== Primary schools ====
Winchester has a variety of Church of England primary schools, including both state and private provision schools.

==== Secondary schools ====
There are three state comprehensive secondary schools in Winchester; the Henry Beaufort School, King's School, and The Westgate School.

==== Special schools ====
Shepherds Down Special School is a state funded special school for pupils aged 4 to 11, located just outside of the city in Compton.

Osborne School is a maintained special school for pupils with learning disabilities aged 11-19.

=== Independent schools ===
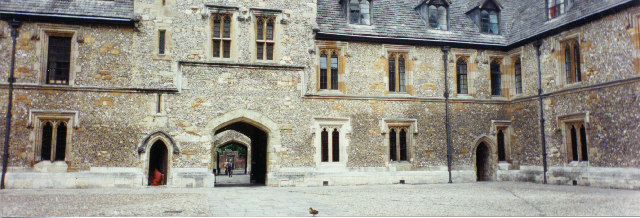
Winchester College's medieval Chamber Court, 1394

Independent junior/preparatory schools are The Pilgrims' School Winchester, the Prince's Mead School and Twyford School, which is just outside the city and claims to be the oldest preparatory school in the United Kingdom. There are two major independent senior schools in Winchester, St Swithun's (a day and boarding school for girls from nursery to sixth form) and Winchester College, a public school. Both schools often top the examination result tables for the city and county.

=== Tertiary, further and higher education ===
The University of Winchester (formerly King Alfred's College) is a public university based in Winchester and the surrounding area. It is ranked 10th for teaching excellence in The Times and The Sunday Times 2016 Good University Guide, with a 92% rating, and fourth for student satisfaction in England in the National Student Survey 2015. The university origins go back as far as 1840, originally as a Diocesan teacher training centre. King Alfred's, the main campus, is located on a purpose-built campus near the city centre. The West Downs campus is a short walk away, and houses student facilities and accommodation and the business school.

The Winchester School of Art was founded in the 1860s as an independent institution and is now a school of the University of Southampton. The School of Art is complemented by the University of Southampton's Erasmus Park student accommodation in Winnall.

Peter Symonds College is a college that serves Winchester. It began as a Grammar school for boys in 1897, and became a co-educational sixth-form college in 1974.

== Sport ==
Winchester has Winchester City FC who currently play in the Southern League and Winchester Castle FC, who have played in the Hampshire League since 1971. The local Saturday football league, the Winchester & District League, folded in 2010. The city also has a walking football club, Winchester Walking Football, which was established in April 2021 and plays at the University Sports Ground.

Winchester City Flyers are a girls' and women's football club established in 1996 with nearly 200 members, playing from U9 to ladies football. They play in the Southern Region Women's Football League.

Winchester has a rugby union team, Winchester RFC, and an athletics club, Winchester and District AC. The city has a field hockey club, Winchester Hockey Club.

Lawn bowls is played at several clubs. The oldest bowling green belongs to Friary Bowling Club (first used in 1820), while the oldest bowls club is Hyde Abbey Bowling Club (established in 1812). Riverside Indoor Bowling Club remains open during the winter months.

There are three 18-hole golf courses. Royal Winchester Golf Club is on downland adjacent to the Clarendon Way. John Henry Taylor was the club professional when winning the Open Championship in 1894 and 1895, and there is a room with memorabilia named after him. Hockley Golf Club is located on St Catherine's Hill. South Winchester Golf Club is another downland course, designed by David Thomas and Peter Alliss. The club was established in 1993.

Winchester College invented and gave its name to Winchester College football.

== Transport ==
=== Railway ===
Winchester railway station is served by two train operating companies:

- South Western Railway provides services on the South West Main Line between London Waterloo, Weymouth, Portsmouth and Southampton
- CrossCountry operates the route between Bournemouth and Manchester Piccadilly, via Reading and Birmingham New Street.

Historically, the city was also served by a line to London via Alton, which partially survives as the Watercress Line. The closure of this line removed an alternative route between London and Winchester when, due to engineering works or other reasons, the main line was temporarily unusable.

There was a second station called Winchester Chesil served by the Didcot, Newbury & Southampton Railway; this closed in the 1960s. This line provided a link to the Midlands and the North, bypassing the present longer route through Reading.

=== Roads ===
Winchester is located near to the M3 motorway and at the meeting of the A34, A31, A3090 and A272 roads. Once a major traffic bottleneck, the city still suffers from congestion at peak times. The A303 and A30 roads pass a few miles to the north of Winchester.

Roman roads ran from Venta Belgarum (Winchester) to Cunetio (Mildenhall, Wiltshire), Calleva Atrebatum (Silchester), Portus Adurni (Portchester), Clausentum (Bitterne) and Sorviodunum (Old Sarum, Wiltshire). A modern recreational footpath from Winchester to Salisbury, called the Clarendon Way, follows part of the Sorviodunum road near Salisbury.

=== Buses ===
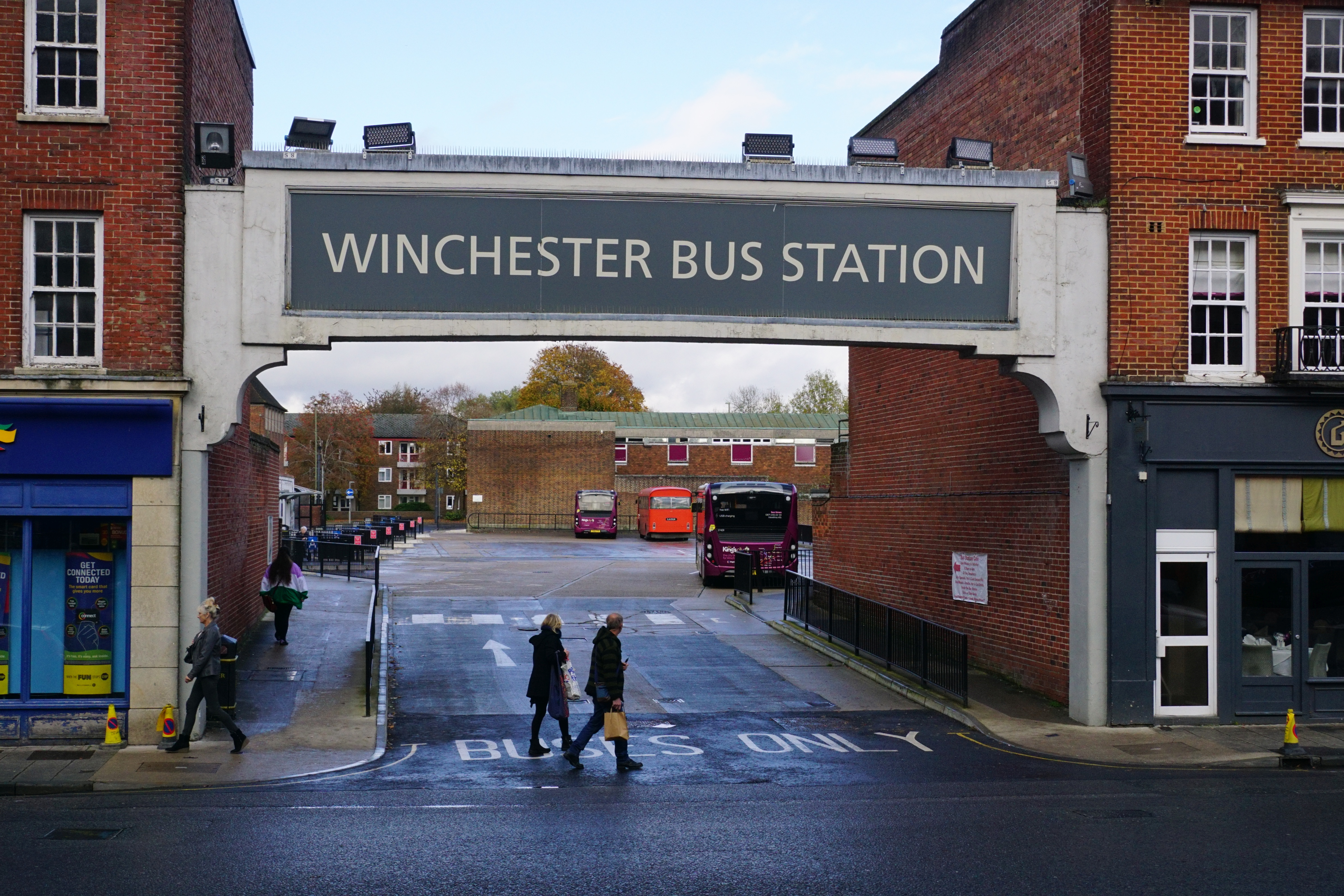
Winchester Bus Station

Bus services are provided by four companies:

- Stagecoach South operates local, rural and park & ride bus services, which run to Andover, Alton, Basingstoke, Petersfield, Romsey and Fareham.
- Bluestar provide services to Southampton. Many services are subsidised by Hampshire County Council and community transport schemes are available in areas without a regular bus service.
- National Express operate services mainly to Bournemouth and London.

==== Community Transport Schemes ====
Three different community transport schemes are provided by Winchester City Council; these are:

- Dial-A-Ride – A service available from 8:45 am to 4:30 pm within the district for those with a mobility or sensory impairment that would make it uncomfortable or impossible to ride in a taxi or bus. The minibuses are fully wheelchair accessible and do not require that individuals are registered as disabled.
- Voluntary Car-Share – These schemes are not exclusive to Winchester area, with many such schemes being offered throughout Hampshire and indeed the UK. A group of volunteer drivers who have their own vehicles offer transport to people in their area that are in need, such as the vulnerable, those with low incomes or for taking people to medical appointments who may be unable to get there themselves.
- Wheels to Work – A scheme for use across Hampshire which is designed to allow people without access to public or private transport to find work, to go to vocational trainings or to attend interviews. The scheme offers a moped (50cc, 110cc or electric) on loan to those 16–25 for anywhere from 3–12 months depending on one's circumstances. The scheme requires that the individual already holds a provisional driving licence and has passed their Compulsory Basic Training (which the scheme also offers to cover the cost for should the individual not have passed yet).

== Law courts ==
Winchester Combined Court Centre hosts both the Crown Court and the County Court. It is administered by His Majesty's Courts and Tribunals Service, an executive agency of the Ministry of Justice. Winchester is a first-tier court centre and is visited by High Court judges for criminal and for civil cases (in the District Registry of the High Court). One of the most high-profile cases to be heard here was the murder trial of Rose West in 1995.

Winchester has a separate district probate registry, which is part of the High Court. This court is separate from the main court establishment at the top of Winchester High Street and deals only with probate matters.

HMP Winchester is a Category B men's prison. A Victorian prison, it is located on Romsey Road, west of the town centre.

== Media and culture ==
Since 1974 Winchester has hosted the annual Hat Fair, a celebration of street theatre that includes performances, workshops, and gatherings at several venues around the city.

Winchester is the home of Blue Apple Theatre, a theatre company that supports performers with learning disabilities to develop theatre, dance and film productions. It won the Queen's Award for Voluntary Service in 2012. Founded in 1997, Platform 4 is a National performance and visual arts company based in Winchester.

Winchester hosts one of the UK's larger farmers' markets, with about 100 stalls. The market takes place on the second and last Sunday of the month in the city centre. The city also hosts the annual Winchester Cathedral Christmas Market, which runs from mid-November to just before Christmas.

Four newspapers are published for Winchester. The weekly paid-for Hampshire Chronicle, which started out in 1772 reporting national and international news, now concentrates on Winchester and the surrounding area. The Southern Daily Echo mostly concerns Southampton, but does also feature Winchester. It has an office shared with sister paper the Hampshire Chronicle. The Mid-Hants Observer is a free, weekly independent paper for Winchester and nearby villages. Its sister paper, the weekly Hampshire Independent, which covers the whole county, is also based in Winchester. The free Winchester News Extra closed in 2017. Winchester had its own radio station, Win FM, from October 1999 to October 2007.

In October 2006, the Channel 4 television programme The Best And Worst Places To Live In The UK, the city was celebrated as the "Best Place in the UK to Live in: 2006". In March 2016, Winchester was named as the best place to live in Britain by the "Sunday Times Best Places To Live" guide.

== International relations ==
Winchester is twinned with:

- Laon, Aisne, Hauts-de-France, France
- Nizhyn, Chernihiv Oblast, Ukraine

The Winchester district is twinned with

- Giessen, Hesse, Germany

Winchester, Virginia, is named after the English city, whose Mayor has a standing invitation to be a part of the American city's Shenandoah Apple Blossom Festival. Winchester also gave its name (Gallicised to "Bicêtre" , a suburb of Paris) from a manor built there by John of Pontoise, Bishop of Winchester, at the end of the 13th century. It is now the commune of Le Kremlin-Bicêtre.

== See also ==
- List of people from Winchester
- Winchester Hat Fair
- Winchester Hoard
