= King's House, Winchester =

Royal palace in Hampshire, UK

Coordinates: 51.062°N 1.321°W

The King's House in Winchester was a late 17th-century planned royal palace in the English county of Hampshire. Winchester had been the capital of Wessex and England in Anglo-Saxon times, but became a backwater after the Norman Conquest of England.

Built for King Charles II of England by Sir Christopher Wren from 1683 to 1685, the King's House stood on a site adjoining the castle it was to replace, and modelled after the Palace of Versailles, though on a somewhat smaller scale. It was to have sweeping views, walks and gardens descending to the cathedral. Although it was structurally completed, the money to complete it ran out and the project was eventually abandoned after the death of Charles II in February 1685. Wren had cheerfully assured the King that the house would be complete in a year, to which Charles, who was feeling his age, made his famous reply that "a year is a great time in my life". The building was gutted by fire in 1894 and demolished.

Columns and parts of the decorative masonry were reused in the Peninsula Barracks building which replaced it in 1900, and which now include Winchester's Military Museums.
