= Kingsgate, Winchester =

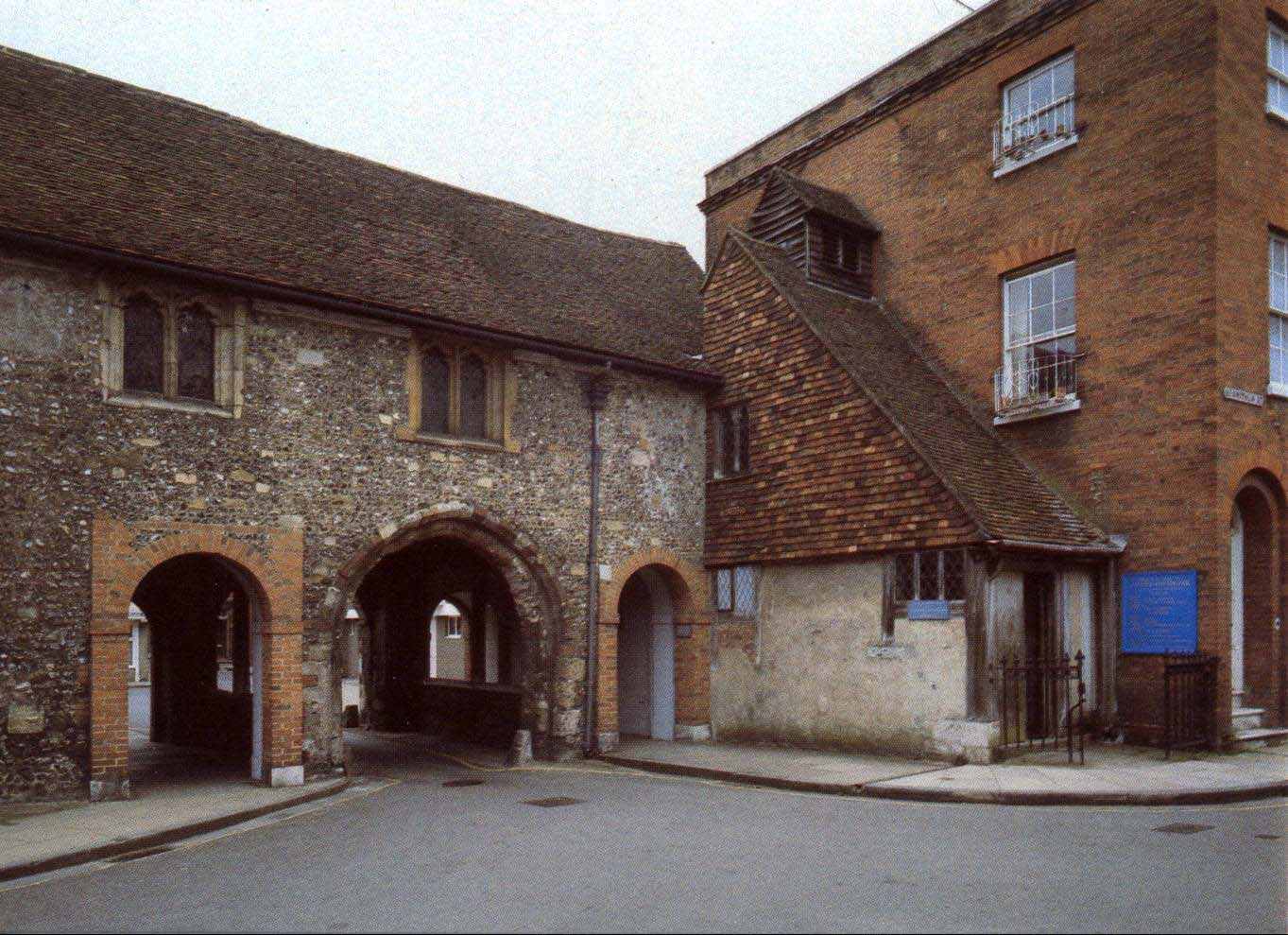
- Kingsgate with St Swithun-upon-Kingsgate Church above, entered by staircase on right

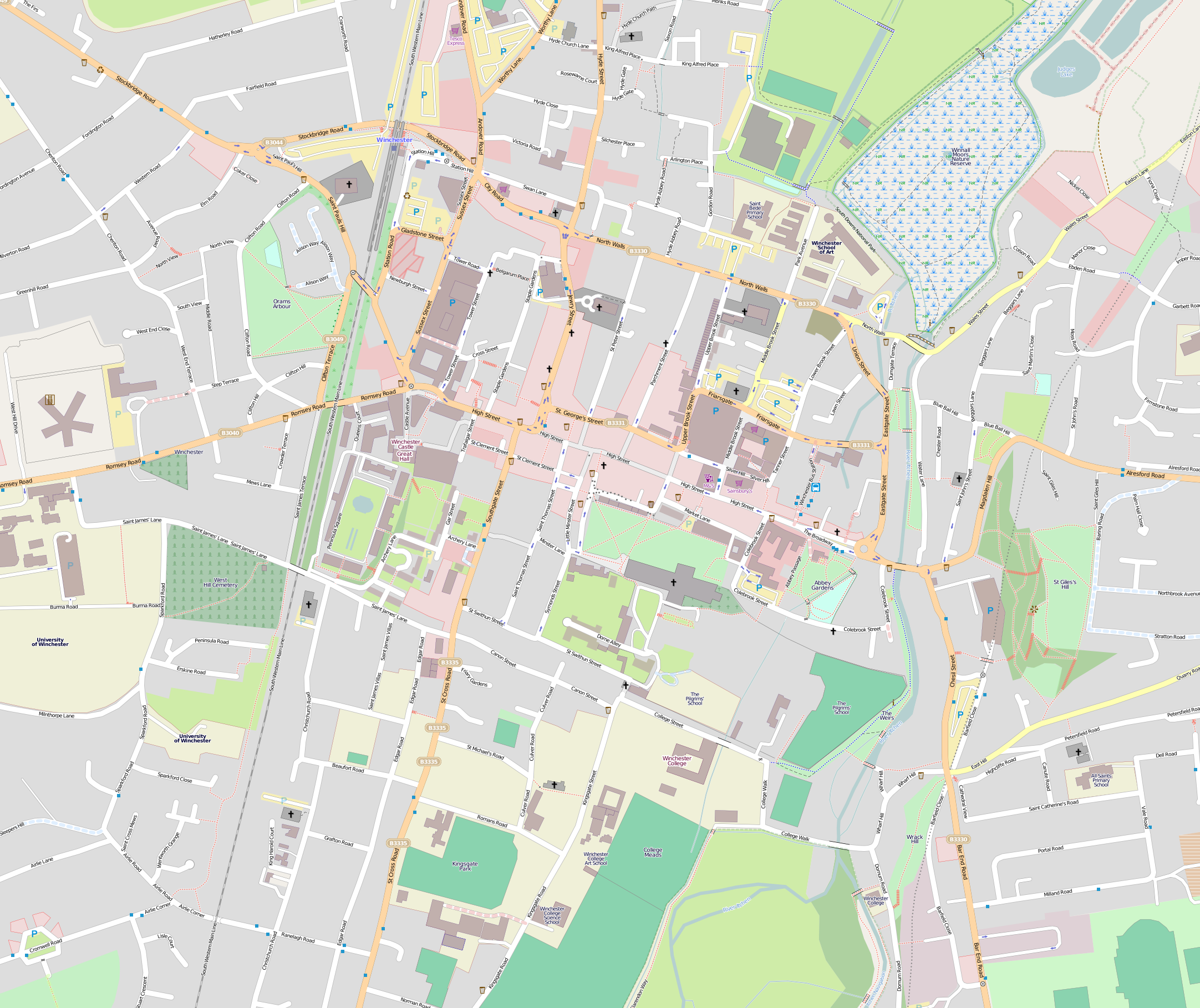
- Location within Central Winchester
- 51°03′33″N 1°18′52″W
- Location: Winchester
- OS grid reference: SU 48144 29092

History
- Built: 14th century

Site notes
- Area: Hampshire
- Architectural style: Medieval

Scheduled monument
- Official name: The King's Gate, Winchester
- Reference no.: 1001938

Kingsgate is one of two surviving medieval gates to the city of Winchester, England (the other is the Westgate). The name was first recorded in 1148. The gate is on, or near, the site of one of the Roman gates to the city, and was the entrance to the royal palace before the Cathedral Close was enclosed in the 10th century. The present gate is probably 14th century, with 18th-century pedestrian walkways.

Above the gate is the small church of St Swithun-upon-Kingsgate. St Swithun was built in the Middle Ages in the Early English style, and is unusual in forming a part of the fabric of the old city walls. It first appears in thirteenth century records and achieved some literary fame, under the fictional name of St Cuthbert's, in Anthony Trollope's novel The Warden.

Kingsgate is a scheduled monument (St Swithun's Church is a Grade I listed building).
