= Oram's Arbour =

Iron Age settlement in Hampshire, England

Coordinates: 51°3′52.87″N 1°19′19.26″W

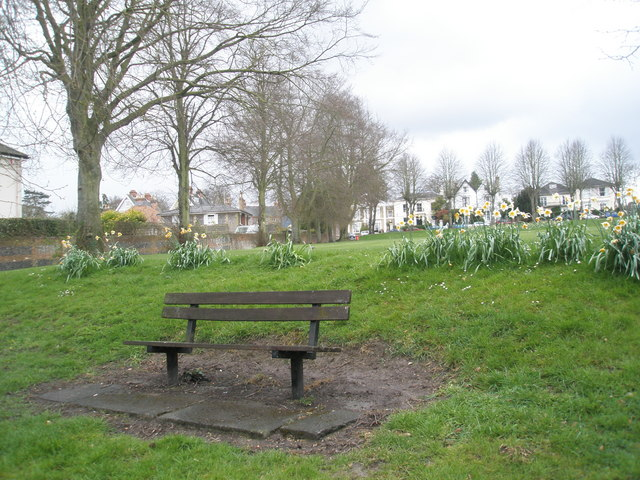
Oram's Arbour

Oram's Arbour was an enclosed settlement (oppidum) during the Iron Age, in what is now Winchester, England. Limited dating evidence suggests the enclosure was dug in the early-mid first century BC. The town wall of the Roman civitas capital of Venta Belgarum which succeeded the Iron Age settlement cut across its eastern end.

Today it is a small grassy park in Winchester, and was formerly used for the annual Winchester Hat Fair both as a picnic site and to stage outdoor theatre and acrobatics.
