= Castle Hill, Winchester =

County building in Winchester, Hampshire, England

Castle Hill
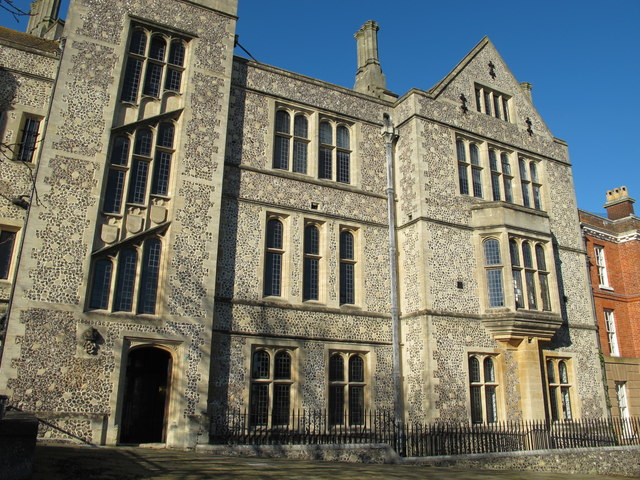
- Part of the eastern elevation of Castle Hill Offices

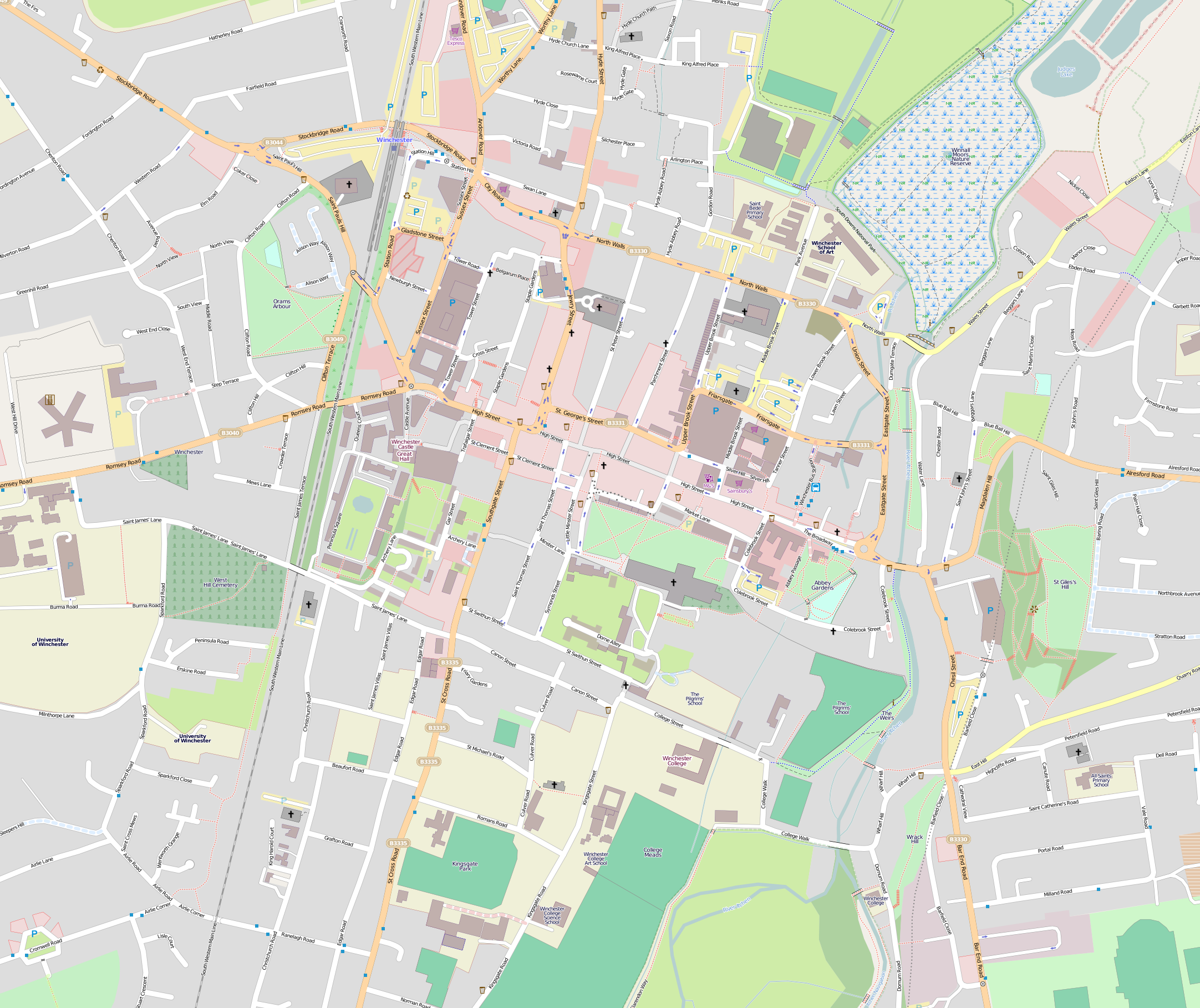
- Location within Central Winchester
- 51°03′49″N 1°19′10″W
- Type: Council offices
- Location: Winchester, Hampshire

History
- Built: 1833

Site notes
- Architect: Owen Browne Carter
- Architectural style: Elizabethan style

Listed Building – Grade II
- Official name: Castle Hill Offices County Hall
- Designated: 14 January 1974
- Reference no.: 1167140

Listed Building – Grade II
- Official name: Castle Avenue Offices County Hall
- Designated: 14 January 1974
- Reference no.: 1167078

Castle Hill is a series of buildings used as council offices in Winchester, Hampshire, England. There are two main structures both of which are Grade II listed buildings: the Castle Hill Offices on the east of Castle Avenue and the Castle Avenue Offices on the west of Castle Avenue. They take their name from Winchester Castle, which is located at the south end of Castle Avenue.

== History ==
The complex was originally designed by Owen Browne Carter in the Elizabethan style and completed in 1833. It was initially used as offices to support the local judicial authorities, who dispensed justice from Winchester Castle, but, following the implementation of the Local Government Act 1888, which established county councils in every county, it also became the offices and meeting place for Hampshire County Council. The Castle Hill Offices were rebuilt to a design by James Robinson and Sir Arthur Blomfield in 1895. The design, which was completed in flint and Bath stone, involved an asymmetrical main frontage on the east side of Castle Avenue; the central section featured two large oriel windows on the left and a tower and a round headed doorway on the right. Internally, the principal rooms in the Castle Hill Offices were the council chamber and the committee rooms.

The Castle Avenue Offices were rebuilt in two phases: the first section, which was designed by William John Taylor and Sir Thomas Jackson, was completed in 1912 and the second section, which was designed by Sir Herbert Baker, was completed in 1932. The design, which was also completed in flint and Bath stone, involved an asymmetrical main frontage on the west side of Castle Avenue; it featured a variety of oriel windows, mullion windows and transom windows.

From the late 19th century the offices also accommodated the headquarters of the 1st Volunteer Battalion of Hampshire Regiment. This unit evolved to become the 4th Battalion the Hampshire Regiment in 1908. The battalion was mobilised at Castle Hill in August 1914 before being deployed to India.

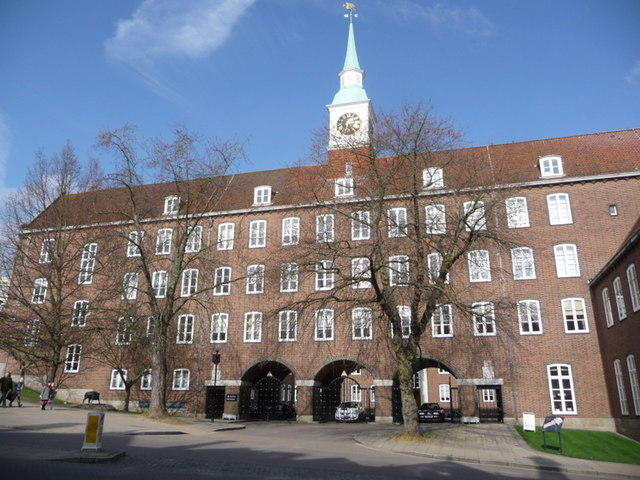
Queen Elizabeth II Court

The council later outgrew the offices at Castle Hill. Queen Elizabeth II Court, a large red-brick rectangular building with a clock tower and a central courtyard, was built to the north of Castle Hill on the opposite side of Upper High Street and was completed in 1960.

The Castle Hill Offices continue to be occupied by the county council who use them for their council chamber and also as the location of their Basing and Portal meeting rooms. In September 2014 the buildings also became the home of the Winchester Register Office.
