= Westgate, Winchester =

Fortified gateway in Winchester, England

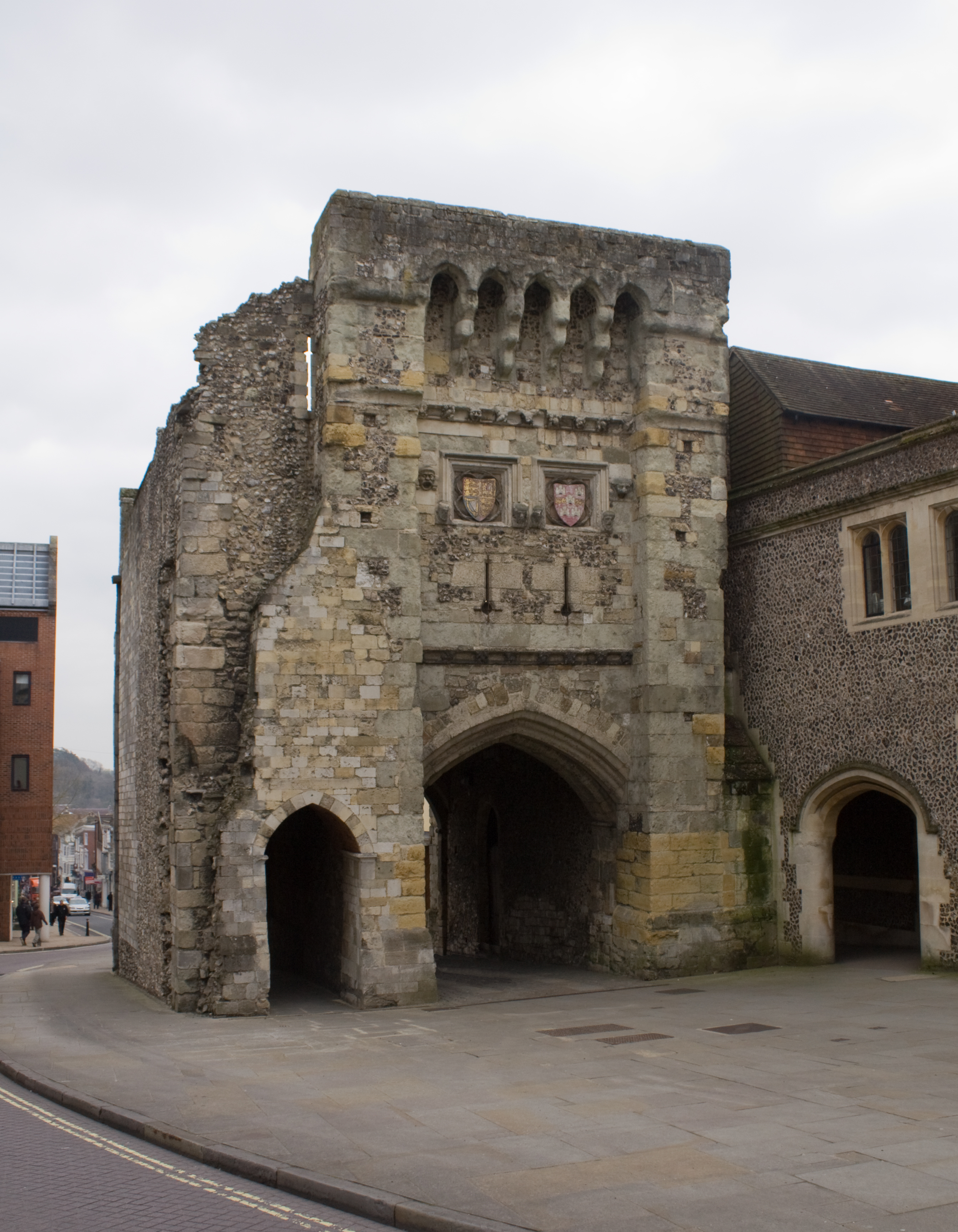

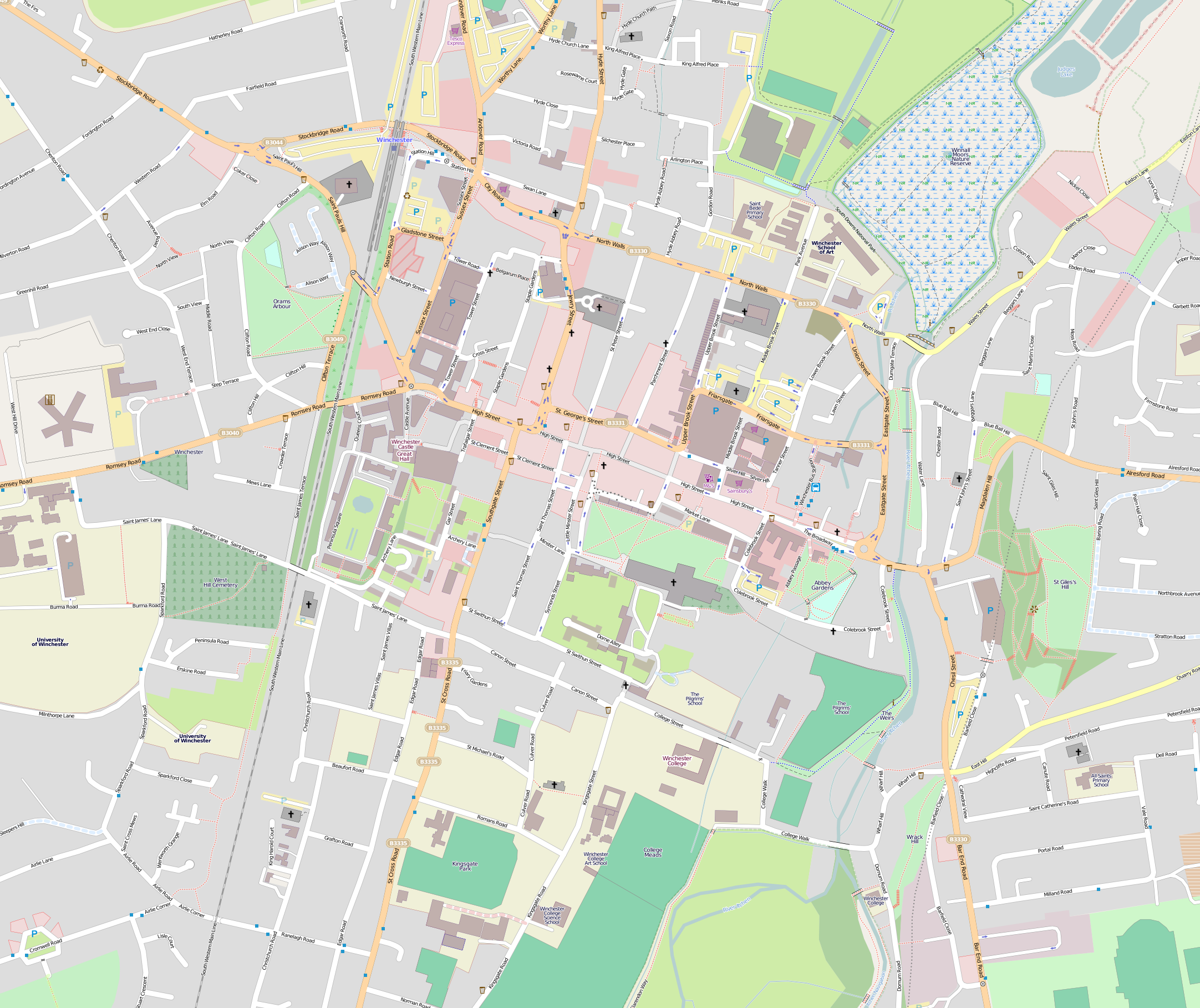
- Location within Central Winchester
- 51°03′49″N 1°19′09″W
- Location: High Street, Winchester, Hampshire
- OS grid reference: SU 47812 29576

Site notes
- Governing body: Hampshire Cultural Trust
- Owner: Winchester City Council

Listed Building – Grade I
- Official name: The Westgate, Winchester
- Designated: 24 March 1950
- Reference no.: 1350695

The Westgate is one of two surviving fortified gateways in Winchester, England (the other is Kingsgate) formerly part of Winchester City Walls. The earliest surviving fabric is of Anglo-Saxon character. The gate was rebuilt in the 12th century and modified in the 13th and late 14th centuries, the latter including a portcullis in the western façade and two inverted-keyhole gunports (for use with hand-held cannon), the earliest in the country. The gate was in use until 1959 when the High Street was routed around it.

In the 19th century the City Corporation (now Winchester City Council) acquired the Westgate and began to use it as a museum and repository for the City archives. In 2014, ownership of the museum space was transferred to Hampshire Cultural Trust. Today, the Westgate Museum's displays include a famous collection of pre-Imperial weights and measures, and a fine painted ceiling made for Winchester College in anticipation of a visit by Mary Tudor and Philip of Spain on the occasion of their marriage in Winchester in 1554.
