= Venta Belgarum =

Town in Roman Britannia

Coordinates: 51.063°N 1.317°W

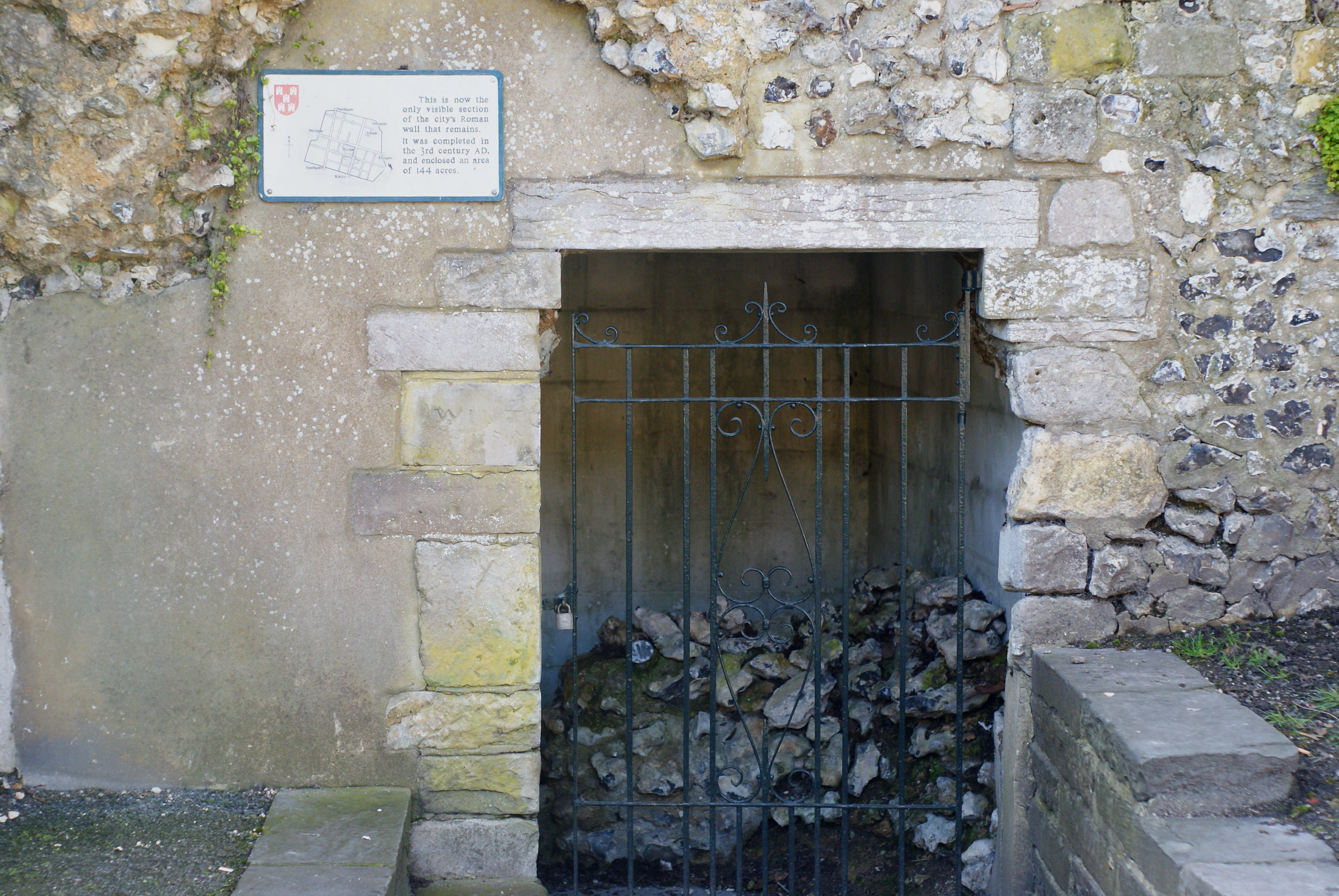
Exposed section of the Roman foundations which lie underneath the medieval city walls

Venta Belgarum, or Venta Bulgarum, was a town in the Roman province of Britannia Superior, the civitas capital of the local tribe, the Belgae, and which later became the city of Winchester.

== Etymology ==
The name is Proto-Celtic in origin: Venta comes from *Uentā, a Common Brittonic word meaning "market". Roman writers recorded the town as Venta Belgarum (The Venta of the Belgae) to distinguish it from the other tribal markets in Britain such as Venta Silurum and Venta Icenorum.

== Development ==
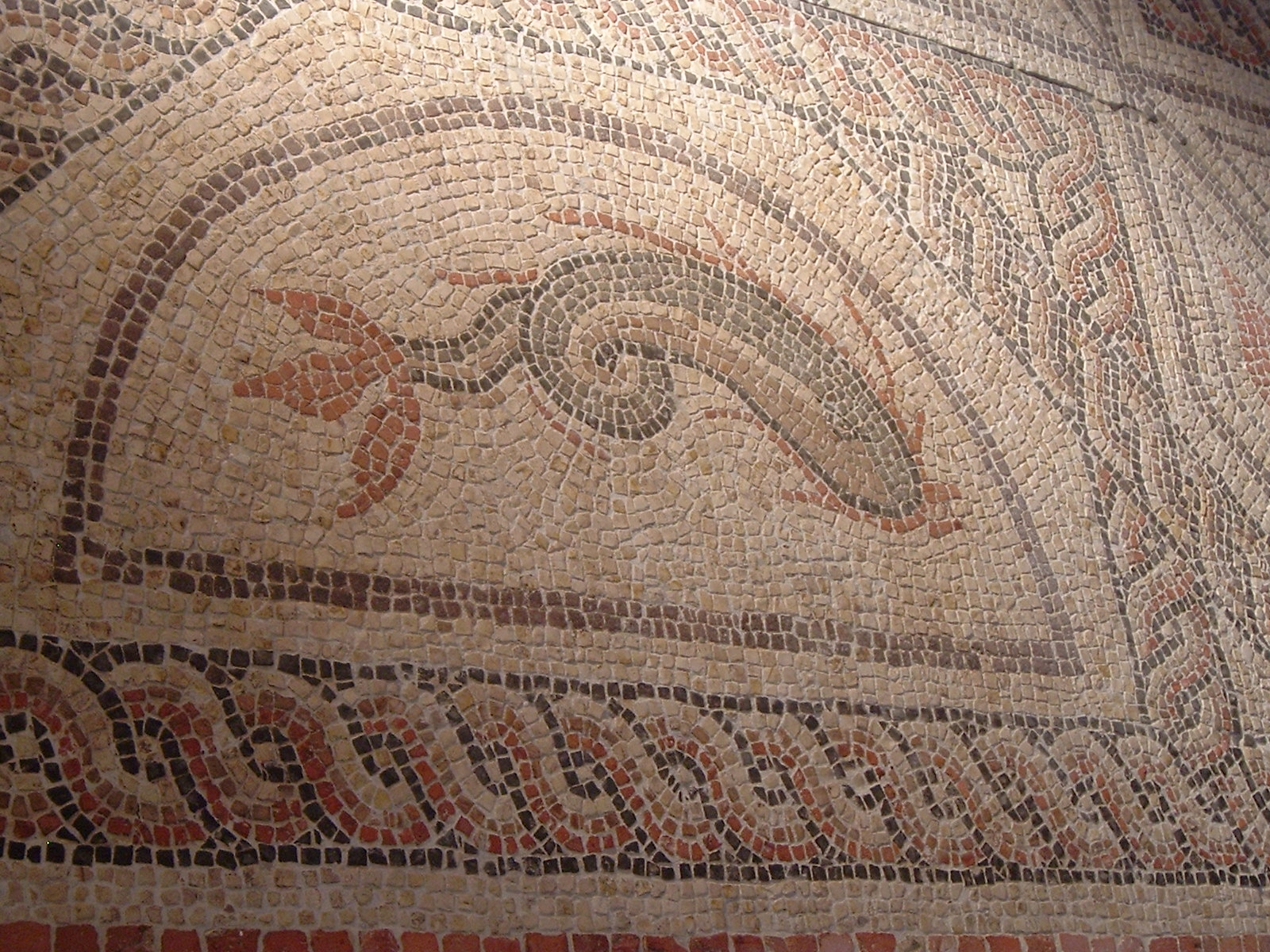
Roman mosaic found locally, now in the Winchester museum

The settlement was apparently established around AD 70, partially on the site of Oram's Arbour, which had been abandoned for some years.

It became the tribal capital of the Belgae, who had probably held several Iron Age hill forts in the near vicinity of the site (St Catherine's Hill, Oram's Arbour and Worthy Down) once the Romans had pacified the area, as was their policy for relocating many other British tribes.

The River Itchen was diverted and a street grid laid out. Although in the early years of the Roman province it was of subsidiary importance to Silchester and Chichester, Venta eclipsed them both by the latter half of the second century.

A defensive bank and ditch were dug around the town in the 2nd century. At the beginning of the third century, Winchester was given protective stone walls. At around this time, the city covered an area of 144 acres (58 ha), making it among the largest towns in Roman Britain by surface area. The city had many fine Roman townhouses or domus, as well as public buildings and Roman temples.

Like many other Roman towns, however, Winchester began to decline in the later fourth century.

== Religion ==
The forum-basilica appears to have included a temple to Jupiter, Juno and Minerva along with an accompanying Jupiter Column. Elsewhere, there was a Romano-British style temple dedicated to the Celtic horse goddess, Epona. There was a large Romano-British cemetery to the north of the town, at Lankhills, and another to the east. Excavations of the cemetery were carried out by British archaeologist Julian Richards in 1998, and again in 2013, as part of the BBC television series Meet the Ancestors.

== Decline ==
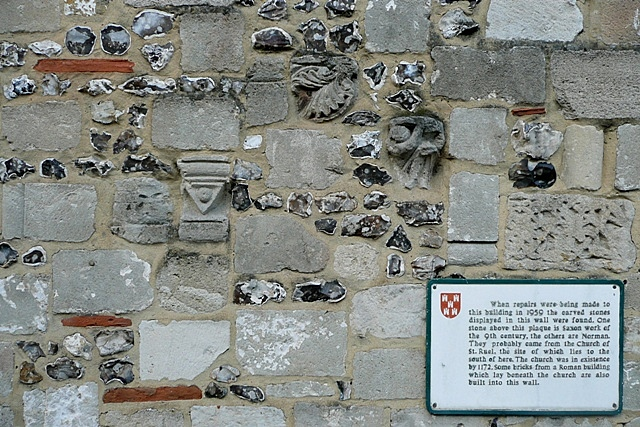
Red Roman bricks are mixed with medieval material in this wall on St. George's Street.

From the mid-4th century, new development at Venta halted. Houses fell into disrepair and the drainage system collapsed. The population concentrated itself in the higher and drier areas of the town. The defences were however strengthened and the cemeteries remained in use, notably with burials of males wearing so-called military-style mercenary belts. Historian David Nash Ford identifies the community as the Cair Guinntguic ("Fort Venta") listed by Nennius among the 28 cities of Britain in his History of the Britons.

Following the Roman withdrawal from Britain in 410, urban life seems to have ceased around 450, although a small administrative centre might have continued after that on the site of the later Anglo-Saxon palace. Amid the Anglo-Saxon settlement of Britain, cemeteries dating to the 6th and 7th centuries suggest a revival of settlement and Wintanceastre became the usual court for the kings of Wessex, and then for other Saxon, Danish, and Norman kings of England.
