= Winchester Hat Fair =

UK annual festival

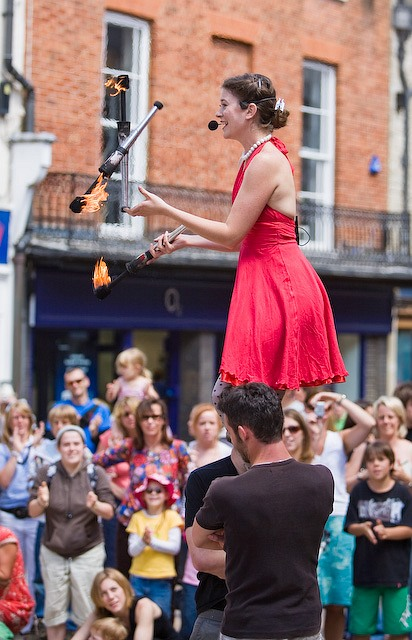
A juggler performing at the Hat Fair in 2008

The Winchester Hat Fair is the UK's longest running festival of street theatre, comedy, and music which is held in Winchester, United Kingdom, always during the first weekend in July.

Originally a buskers' fair, the first Hat Fair was held in 1974. Although the City Council and the local business community initially opposed it, they now support the event, which brings about 40,000 people to watch. The Hat Fair's organising and co-ordinating committee, which is also local to the city, has charge over the travelling players who converge from around the country and abroad to perform at the Hat Fair.

The first Hat Fair emerged from an informal gathering of friends, who tried out their new shows upon audiences, and who were paid by donations of money into a hat — from which practice the 'Hat' Fair got its name. The core group included members of the Winchester-based Attic Theatre Company, founded and directed by mime artist Jonathan Kay, who continues in the role of Founder and artistic director of the Hat Fair to the present day.

Over the years, the Hat Fair gained enough status that it was able to obtain funding from regional arts funders and the local authorities, as well as commercial sponsors.

The aim of the Hat Fair's organisers is to continually raise the standards of UK street theatre, and to aid artists in their development from buskers to professional performers, by providing them with hospitality, conducive performing conditions, and, if possible, a small fee for their performances.

Early fairs involved an evening of cabaret in which some of the best acts were showcased. Gradually, this expanded from one evening to four nights, in addition to a series of workshops aimed at developing local talent, and a street party on the Hat Fair's last night.
