= List of places of worship in the City of Winchester District =

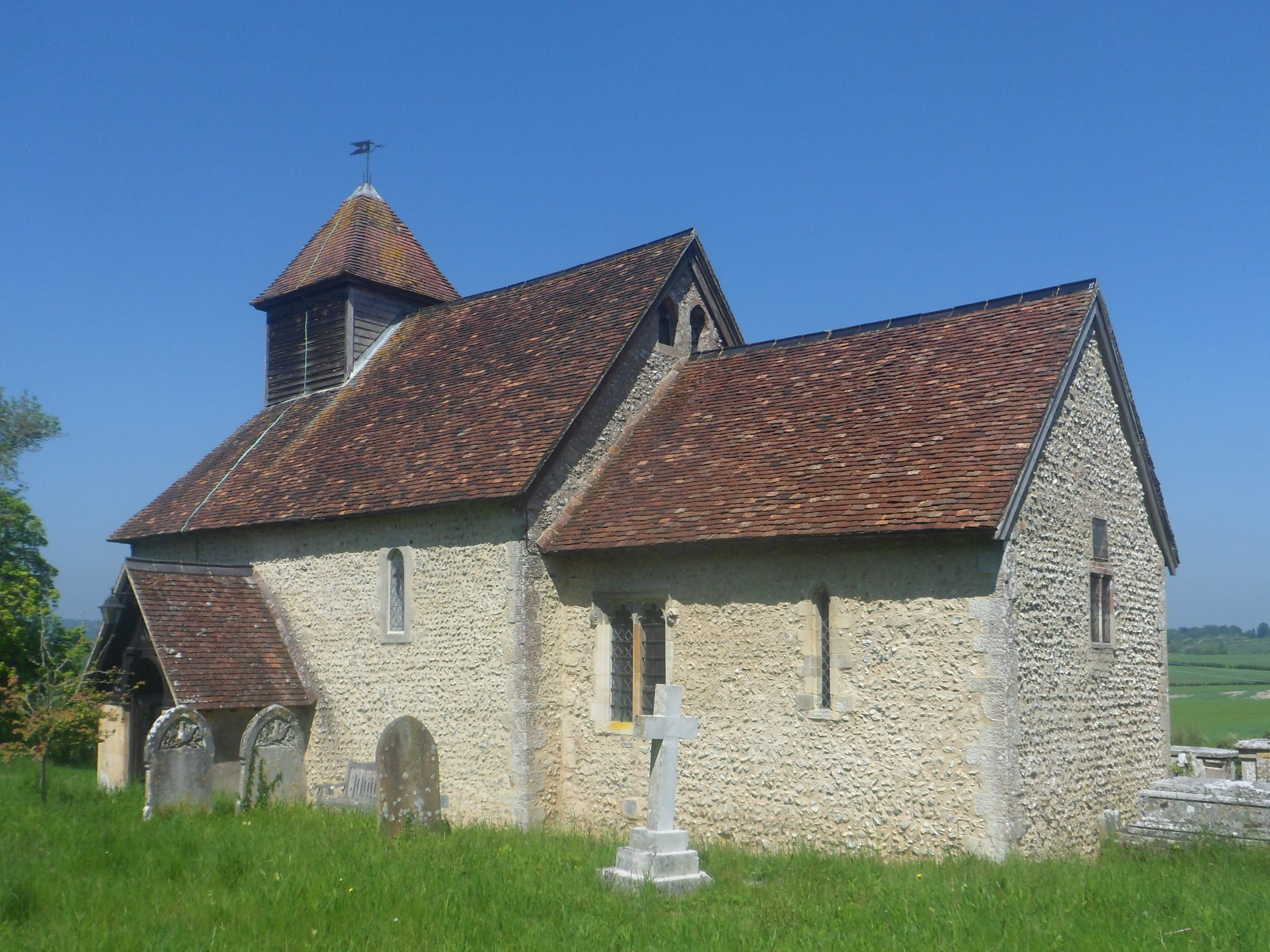
St Andrew's Church in the hamlet of Chilcomb was built between 1120 and 1140.

As of 2026, there are more than 140 current and former places of worship in the district of the City of Winchester in the English county of Hampshire. Christian denominations and groups of various descriptions use 108 churches, chapels and meeting halls for worship, and there is also a mosque for adherents of Islam; another 34 former churches and chapels no longer serve a religious function but survive in alternative uses. The City of Winchester is one of 13 local government districts in the county of Hampshire—a large county in central southern England, with a densely populated coastal fringe facing the English Channel and a more rural hinterland. The district covers a large, mostly rural area in the centre of the county, focused on the ancient and historic cathedral city of Winchester—where a settlement existed by the Middle Iron Age, the first church was built in the mid-7th century, and the present inner-city street layout was established by Alfred the Great in the 880s. In the surrounding area are small market towns such as Alresford and Bishop's Waltham, each with a variety of places of worship, and dozens of villages with medieval Church of England parish churches and, often, a Nonconformist chapel: various forms of Methodism were strong locally in the 19th and 20th centuries, and several Methodist chapels remain open.

The 2021 United Kingdom census found that, although not forming a majority, the largest percentage of the district's population was Christian. A large proportion of places of worship are churches belonging to the Church of England—the country's Established Church—but the Roman Catholic Church has an unbroken history locally even during the post-Reformation "penal era", and several Catholic churches are in use. Of the major Nonconformist denominations, Methodism was always the strongest locally—as late as 1940 there were 27 chapels in use—and, apart from one United Reformed congregation in Bishop's Waltham, worshipping communities of Baptists, the United Reformed Church, Quakers and The Salvation Army are confined to Winchester itself. Groups of Evangelicals, Open Brethren and Pentecostals linked to the Assemblies of God denomination also have their own places of worship; and several of Britain's smaller and less mainstream groups meet in the area as well, such as Christian Scientists, Latter-day Saints and members of the Plymouth Brethren Christian Church, who have several meeting rooms.

Historic England or its predecessor English Heritage have awarded listed status to 70 current and nine former places of worship in the district. A building is defined as "listed" when it is placed on a statutory register of buildings of "special architectural or historic interest" in accordance with the Planning (Listed Buildings and Conservation Areas) Act 1990. The Department for Culture, Media and Sport, a Government department, is responsible for this; Historic England, a non-departmental public body, acts as an agency of the department to administer the process and advise the department on relevant issues. There are three grades of listing status. Grade I, the highest, is defined as being of "exceptional interest"; Grade II* is used for "particularly important buildings of more than special interest"; and Grade II, the lowest, is used for buildings of "special interest".

== Overview of the district and its places of worship ==
The district is located in the centre of Hampshire.

The City of Winchester district covers about 250 square miles (650 km^{2}) of land in the central part of Hampshire and had a population of about 118,000 in 2017, rising to nearly 127,500 in 2021. Clockwise from the south, it shares borders with the city of Portsmouth, the boroughs of Fareham and Eastleigh, the district of Test Valley, the borough of Basingstoke and Deane, the district of East Hampshire and the borough of Havant, all in Hampshire. The largest centre of population is the ancient cathedral city of Winchester, where about one-third of the district's residents live; other large settlements are Denmead (2017 population 7,175), Bishop's Waltham (6,750) and Alresford (also known as New Alresford; 6,300).

Winchester, situated at a narrow crossing point of the River Itchen, was important to a succession of settlers: evidence from the Early and Middle Iron Ages survives, and the remains of the settlement were taken over by the Romans, expanded and named Venta Belgarum. After the Romans left, "a wave of Germanic settlement occurred", followed by the arrival of Anglo-Saxons. They quickly established a church (the Old Minster) here, and by 660 it was a cathedral. The present Winchester Cathedral replaced it in the late 11th century, and the city was thereafter an important centre of Christianity. Abbeys, priories, almshouses (such as the Hospital of St Cross) and religious houses opened across the city, and by 1300 there were 54 churches within its boundaries. The only survivors from that era in the city are St Leonard and St Swithun-upon-Kingsgate, although the tower of St Maurice still stands and the redundant St Peter Chesil is now a theatre.

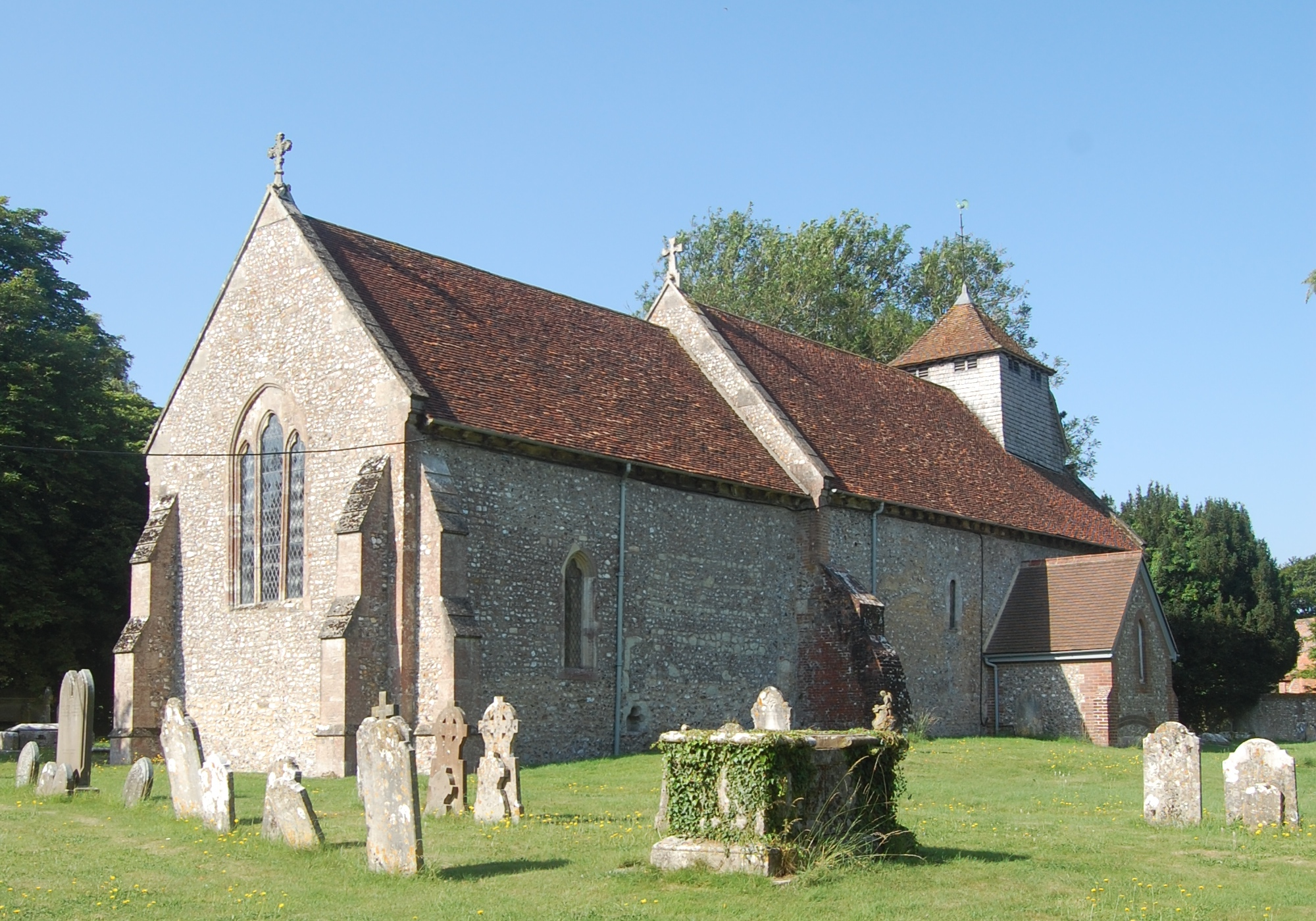
St Nicholas' Church, Bishops Sutton has Norman origins.

The Anglo-Saxons founded many other churches in the surrounding villages and countryside, and some survive in whole or in part. (Note: In this section, when only the name of a town or village is shown, the Anglican parish church is being referred to.) Boarhunt is "a very valuable specimen of a pre-[Norman] Conquest building" and has been dated to the 1060s. Corhampton, which was altered in the 19th century, may date from as early as 1020. Hambledon was extended several times in the medieval era but retains much Saxon-era fabric inside, as does Headbourne Worthy, where some of the work has been dated to c. 1030. Tichborne, prominently sited on a hill, has kept its Saxon layout and its contemporary chancel, although the nave was built in the Norman era (the 12th century). That period was significant for the area's parish churches: many were founded or rebuilt. Chilcomb, Easton and Farley Chamberlayne are wholly Norman or have been only slightly altered. Others of that era, with varying amounts of surviving Norman features, include Bighton, Bishops Sutton, Bishop's Waltham, Bramdean, Cheriton, Compton, Crawley, Droxford (a "typical ... Hampshire village church" of the Norman era), Martyr Worthy, Morestead, Soberton, Southwick, Sparsholt, Stoke Charity, Warnford and Wickham. The 13th century, when Norman architecture transitioned into Gothic, also left its mark locally: new churches, many of which were altered, extended or rebuilt at various times between the 16th and 19th centuries, were provided in the villages of Durley, Exton, Hunton, Kilmeston, Meonstoke, Micheldever and Upham, and Owslebury's church dates from the late 13th and early 14th centuries.

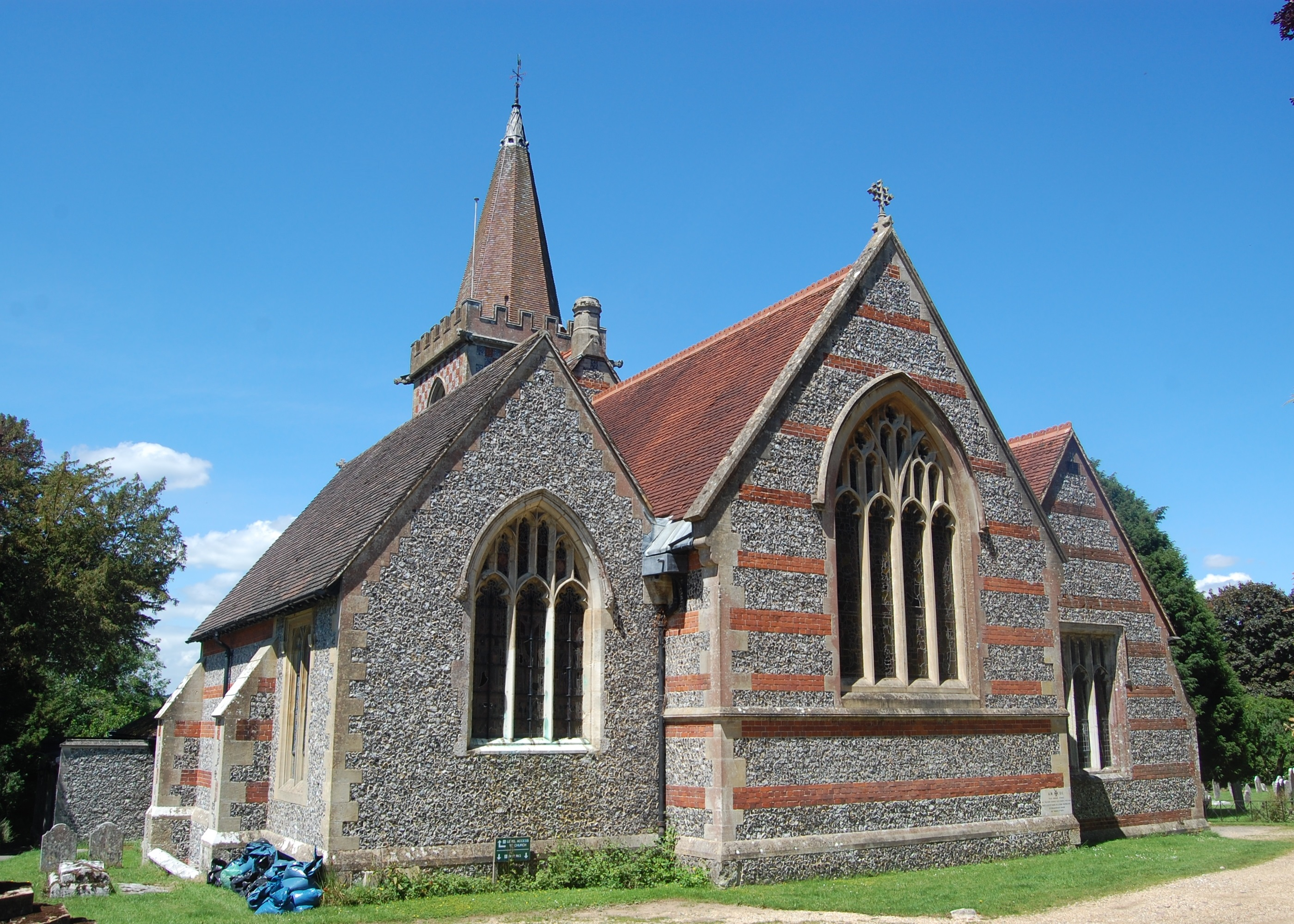
StMary the Virgin's Church at Twyford was one of many to be rebuilt or restored in the Victorian era.

Little happened for the next four centuries to the area's parish churches except for some extensions or refitting: the only new church was Avington, a Georgian "gem" described as "the best in the county" of its era (it was completed in 1771). The church at Old Alresford was also rebuilt in Georgian style around this time. Churchbuilding and rebuilding took off in the following century, though: many churches in the area underwent restoration in the Victorian era or shortly afterwards, in common with many other places. Some of these programmes of works were carried out by architects of national significance: Arthur Blomfield at Alresford, Thomas Graham Jackson at Bishop's Waltham, Corhampton, Winchester Cathedral and Wonston, Henry Woodyer at Easton, George Edmund Street at Headbourne Worthy and Upham, William Butterfield at Sparsholt, the Hospital of St Cross (St Faith's Church) and St Michael's, Winchester, and Alfred Waterhouse at Twyford (a near-complete rebuild retaining some older fragments). Also prolific locally were father and son John and John Barnes Colson of Winchester, who were in partnership as architects and who worshipped at All Saints Church in Compton; between them at various times they restored that church and Durley, Kings Worthy, Martyr Worthy, Micheldever, Morestead, Old Alresford, Tichborne, Warnford, and St Bartholomew and St Swithun-upon-Kingsgate at Winchester. John senior also designed new churches at Newtown (1847–50; the first church he designed anywhere), Woodmancott (1854–56), Ovington (1865–67, replacing an older building on the site), St Paul, Winchester (1872–89) and Shedfield (1875–80), and in 1860 added to the church at Swanmore which had been designed by Benjamin Ferrey 14 years earlier. Other entirely new churches of the Victorian era, some of which (like Swanmore) were by nationally recognised architects, include Otterbourne (1837–38, by Owen Browne Carter); Beauworth (1838); Colden Common (1842–44); West Meon (1843–46, by George Gilbert Scott); Denmead (1880, by James Fowler); and Curdridge, East Stratton and Northington, all designed by Thomas Graham Jackson in the late 1880s. As well as the Colson-designed St Paul, the growth of Winchester prompted the construction of Holy Trinity in 1853–54, Christ Church in 1859–61 and All Saints in 1885 to the designs of Henry Woodyer, Ewan Christian and John Loughborough Pearson respectively. Much more modest were the tin tabernacles erected on Bramdean Common in 1883 and at South Wonston, replaced in the 1990s by a new church. Other 20th-century Anglican churches were built to cater for Winchester's continued suburban growth: at Oliver's Battery a prefabricated Reema Construction hall was bought and erected in 1956, a church opened in 1962 on the Stanmore estate, and a large brick church was completed in Weeke five years later.

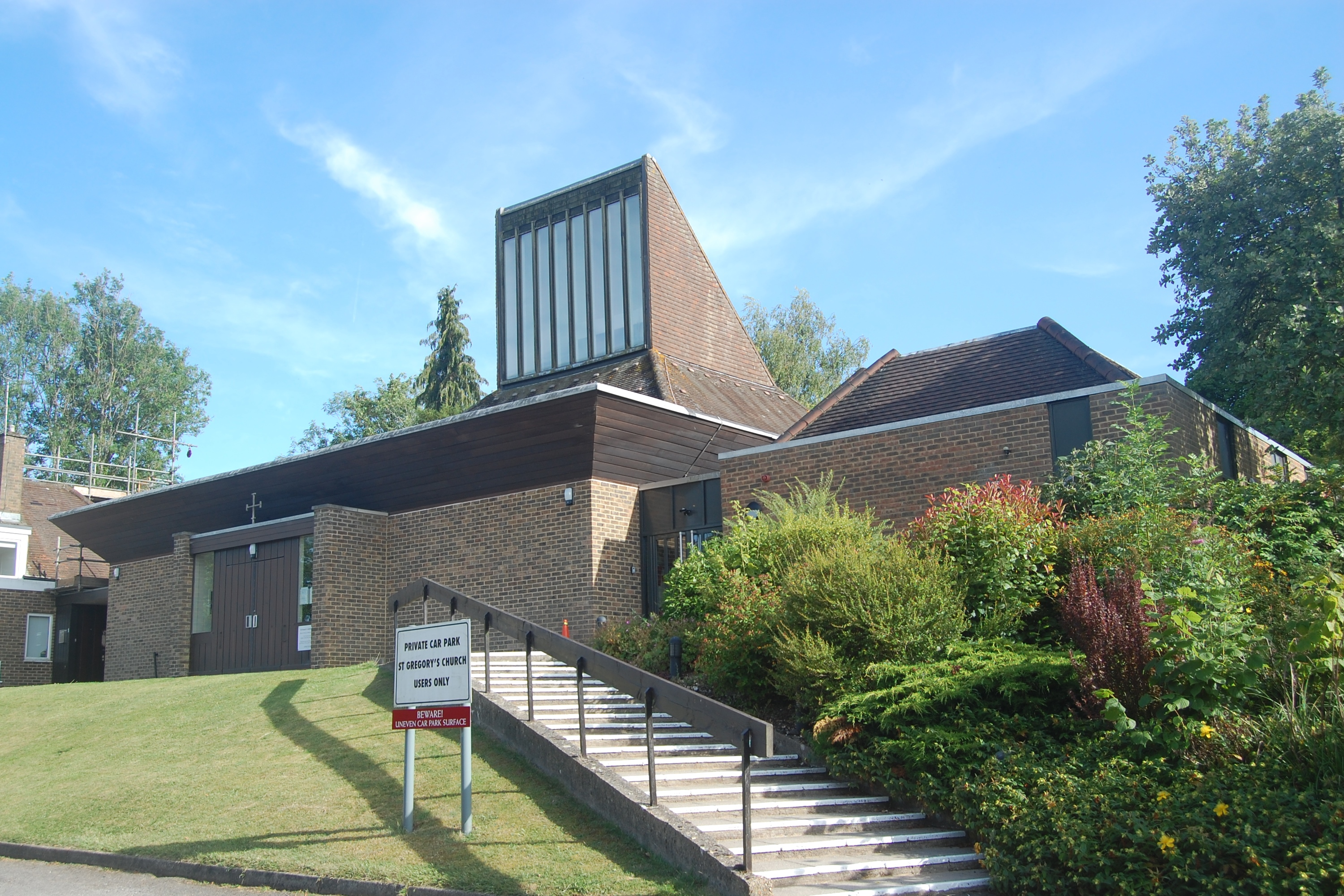
Alresford has a Modernist 1960s Catholic church.

The Roman Catholic faith was largely suppressed throughout England after the Reformation in the 16th century but survived in Winchester, albeit largely hidden. A house was used for the secret celebration of Mass, and in 1583 "much evidence [was] discovered to show it was a major Mass centre". A resident priest was appointed by a later owner of the house, Roger Corham, around 1674, and a shed in the priest's garden was used as a chapel from c. 1740. Later extended and dedicated, it became the first consecrated post-Reformation Catholic church in England. It was used until the present St Peter's Church opened in 1926. As the city grew, additional Catholic chapels were built at Weeke (1957; no longer extant) and Oliver's Battery (1969; still in use as St Stephen's Church). Another place nearby where Catholicism "appears to have enjoyed a little-persecuted existence since the Reformation" was Tichborne near Alresford. A chapel at Tichborne House was used for Masses for many years, certainly by 1633, and in the new (1803) house one survives in occasional use; it was superseded by a large Modernist church, St Gregory the Great, in Alresford in 1968. Further south, in Bishop's Waltham, Mass was celebrated from 1906 at an inn, then the chapel of the nearby seminary was used until the present Church of Our Lady Queen of Apostles was built. Nearby, at Wickham, the Park Place Catholic retreat and pastoral centre has a chapel which is open for public Masses.

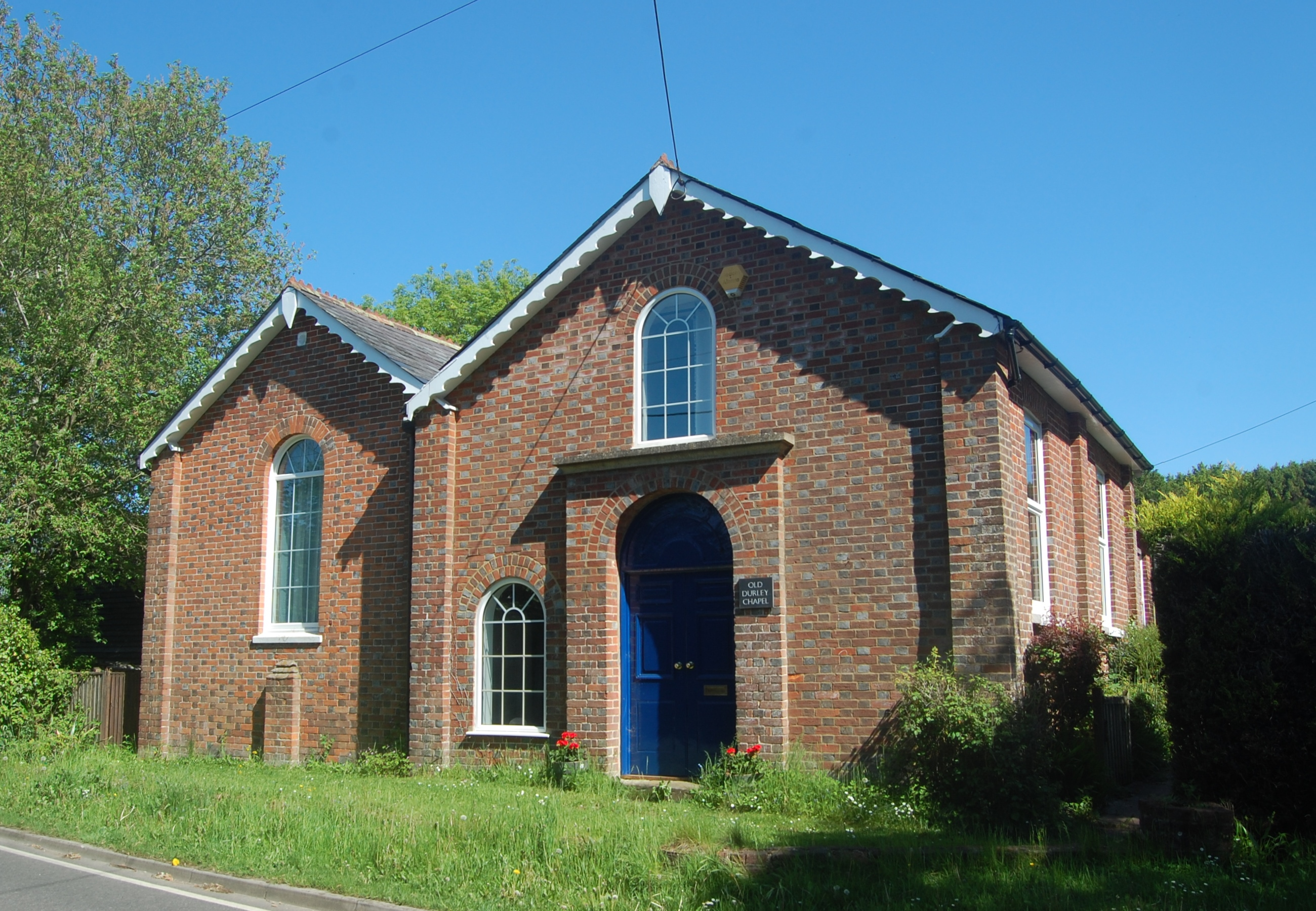
The Methodist chapel at Durley is no longer in religious use.

The Methodist Church of Great Britain documented all the chapels it owned as of 1940 in a statistical return published in 1947. Within the boundaries of the present City of Winchester district at that time, there were 27 chapels representing the denomination's three historic strands: Wesleyanism, Primitive Methodism and the United Methodist Church. There were chapels of Wesleyan origin at Durley, Longwood Dene (near Cheriton) and Winchester; United Methodist chapels at Colden Common, Kings Worthy, Soberton, Sparsholt, Twyford and Upham; and former Primitive Methodist chapels at Baybridge, Bishop's Waltham, Curdridge, Droxford, East Stratton, Easton, Hambledon, Meonstoke, the neighbouring villages of Micheldever and Micheldever Station, New Alresford, Shirrell Heath, Sutton Scotney, Swanmore, Swarraton, Waltham Chase, West Meon and Winchester. Most of these closed in the late 20th or early 21st century: for example Meonstoke (demolished) closed in 1962, West Meon in 1990, Curdridge in 2004 and Soberton in 2009. Two of Winchester's chapels were still open in 1973, but they amalgamated with Winchester United Reformed Church in the latter's building to form Winchester United Church. In contrast, population growth in the Waltham Chase area led to that village's 19th-century chapel being expanded twice in the late 20th century.

Historically, Congregationalism was strong in Hampshire, and many chapels (now part of the United Reformed Church) can trace their origins back to 17th- or 18th-century Presbyterian or Independent causes. This is the case with the present Winchester United Church, built in 1852–53 and "striking in its originality" but founded on a different site in the late 17th century. The present chapel was built into the walls of the old County Jail, which had been closed in 1850: it "oddly separates" the north wing and the main façade of the former jail, both of which are now in alternative use. The only other surviving cause is at Bishop's Waltham, though, where a chapel of 1862 was succeeded by the present building in 1910. Like Winchester it is a joint Methodist and United Reformed church. Similarly, the only Baptist chapels in the district are in Winchester: a building of 1865 for General Baptists and the Hyde Street Chapel, serving Reformed Baptists. Quakers had a burial ground in Winchester in the 18th century but only restarted their regular meetings in 1940 and moved to their current building in 1973. The Salvation Army registered a building in the city in 1889 and replaced it in 1995. The Winchester Soldiers' Home and Mission was founded in the late 19th century and had Evangelical mission chapels at Shawford and in Winchester city centre; the latter is now a Gospel hall of Open Brethren.

== Religious affiliation ==
According to the 2021 United Kingdom census, 127,444 lived in the City of Winchester district. Of these, 48.61% identified themselves as Christian, 0.74% were Hindu, 0.71% were Muslim, 0.62% were Buddhist, 0.17% were Jewish, 0.15% were Sikh, 0.53% followed another religion, 42.18% claimed no religious affiliation and 6.3% did not state their religion. The proportions of Christians, Buddhists and people who followed no religion were higher than the figures in England as a whole (46.32%, 0.46% and 36.67% respectively). Islam, Judaism, Hinduism and Sikhism had a lower following in the district than in the country overall: in 2021, 6.73% of people in England were Muslim, 1.81% were Hindu, 0.92% were Sikh and 0.48% were Jewish.

== Administration ==
=== Anglican churches ===
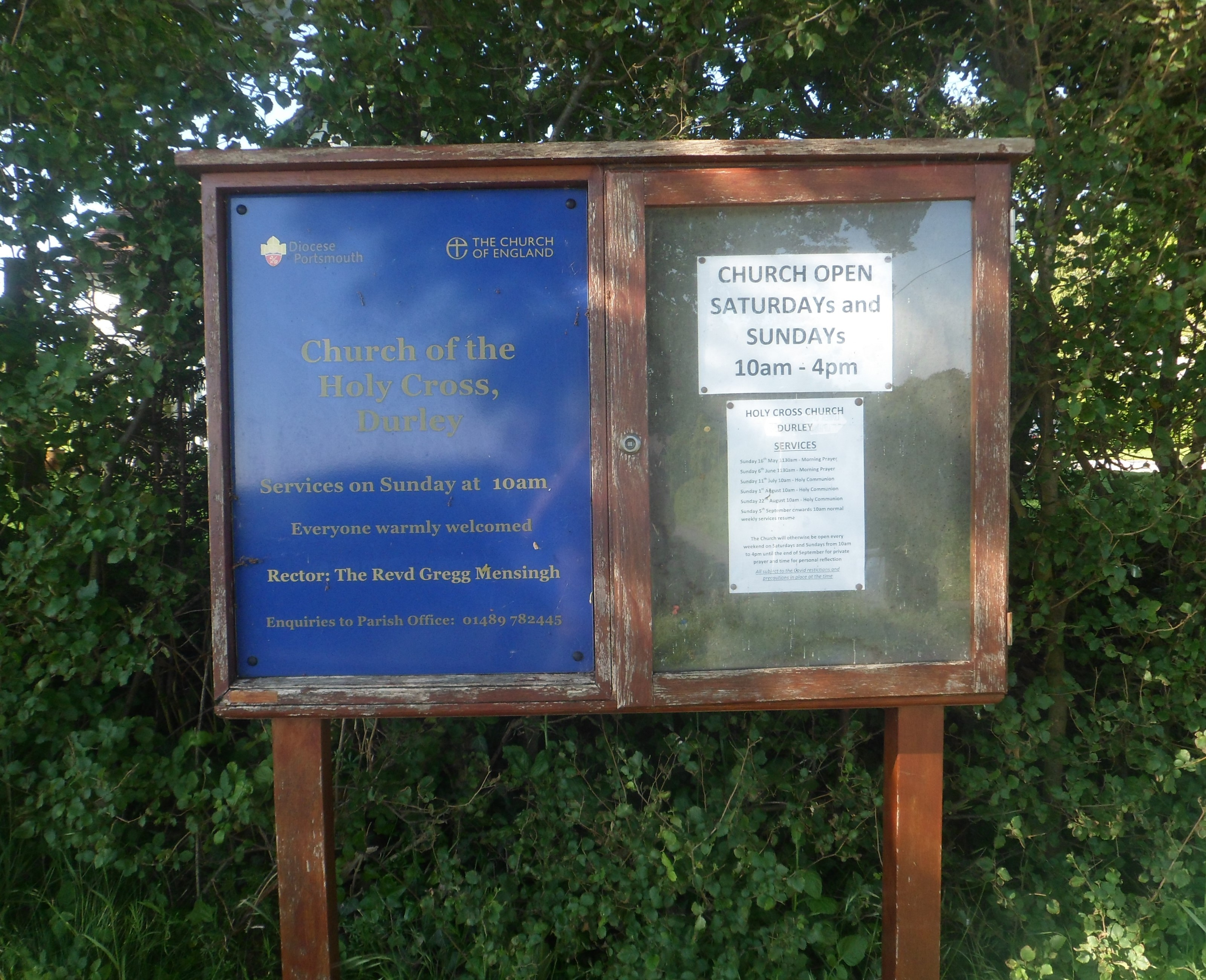
The district's Anglican churches are in the Diocese of Portsmouth, like Holy Cross at Durley (signboard pictured), or the Diocese of Winchester.

The district lies across the boundary of the Anglican dioceses of Winchester, which is based at Winchester Cathedral, and Portsmouth, whose seat is Portsmouth Cathedral. The parish churches of Bishop's Waltham, Boarhunt, Corhampton, Curdridge, Droxford, Durley, Exton, Hambledon, Meonstoke, Newtown, Shedfield, Soberton, Southwick, Swanmore, Upham and Wickham are administered by the Bishop's Waltham Deanery of Portsmouth diocese; All Saints Church at Denmead is within the Havant Deanery of the same diocese; and the Petersfield Deanery administers the churches at Warnford and West Meon. In the Diocese of Winchester, Alresford Deanery administers the churches at Alresford, Avington, Beauworth, Bighton, Bishop's Sutton, Bramdean, Bramdean Common, Cheriton, Easton, Hinton Ampner, Itchen Abbas, Kilmeston, Martyr Worthy, Northington, Old Alresford, Ovington and Tichborne; Crawley, Littleton and Sparsholt's churches are in Andover Deanery; Farley Chamberlayne is part of Romsey Deanery; and Winchester Deanery looks after the churches at Chilcomb, Colden Common, Compton, East Stratton, Headbourne Worthy, Hunton, Hursley, King's Worthy, Micheldever, Morestead, Otterbourne, Owslebury, South Wonston, Stoke Charity, Twyford, Wonston and Woodmancote and those in Winchester itself (All Saints, Christ Church, Holy Trinity, St Bartholomew, St Faith, St John the Baptist, St Lawrence, St Paul and St Swithun-upon-Kingsgate) and its suburbs of Oliver's Battery (St Mark), Stanmore (St Luke) and Weeke (St Barnabas and St Matthew). The former parish church of St Michael, now Winchester College Chapel, is also formally within this Deanery.

=== Roman Catholic churches ===
The Catholic churches at Alresford, Bishop's Waltham, Oliver's Battery, Tichborne House and Winchester are part of the Roman Catholic Diocese of Portsmouth, whose seat is the Cathedral of St John the Evangelist in Portsmouth. The Church of Our Lady, Queen of Apostles at Bishop's Waltham is one of the six churches in St Swithun Wells parish, (Note: The others are in Chandler's Ford, Eastleigh and Fair Oak, all in the Borough of Eastleigh, and North Baddesley and Romsey in Test Valley district.) which is part of the Three Rivers Pastoral Area of Deanery 4 in the Diocese. The parish covers a large area of mostly rural land in West Hampshire, from the villages of the Meon Valley in the east to the county boundary with Wiltshire in the west, and the northern suburbs of Southampton in the south to the A30 road and villages around Winchester to the north. The churches of St Gregory the Great at Alresford, St Stephen at Oliver's Battery, St Margaret of Scotland at Tichborne House and St Peter at Winchester are in the five-church Hampshire Downs parish in the Hampshire Downs Pastoral Area of the same deanery. (Note: St Thomas More's Church at Stockbridge in Test Valley district is the other church in this parish.)

=== Other denominations ===
Alresford Methodist Church, Colden Common Methodist Church, Twyford Methodist Chapel, Wesley Methodist Church at Weeke and Winchester United Church, a joint Methodist and United Reformed congregation, are administered by the Winchester, Eastleigh & Romsey Methodist Circuit. Hedge End Methodist Church is in the Southampton Methodist Circuit. The chapels at Hambledon, Shirrell Heath, Swanmore and Waltham Chase, and the joint Methodist and United Reformed church at Bishop's Waltham, are part of the Meon Valley Methodist Circuit. Winchester United Church and Bishop's Waltham United Free Church are also part of Wessex Synod of the United Reformed Church. Winchester Baptist Church belongs to the Southern Counties Baptist Association. Winchester Evangelical Church belongs to two Evangelical groups: the Fellowship of Independent Evangelical Churches (FIEC), a pastoral and administrative network of about 500 churches with an evangelical outlook, and Affinity (formerly the British Evangelical Council), a network of conservative Evangelical congregations throughout Great Britain. Winchester Baptist Church belongs to the Southern Counties Baptist Association. Hyde Street Chapel in Winchester is part of GraceNet UK, an association of Reformed Evangelical Christian churches and organisations.

== Listed status ==
Grade	Criteria
Grade I	Buildings of exceptional interest, sometimes considered to be internationally important.
Grade II*	Particularly important buildings of more than special interest.
Grade II	Buildings of national importance and special interest.

In the City of Winchester district, 22 churches have Grade I-listed status, 27 (including three former churches) are listed at Grade II* and 30 (including six former churches) have Grade II listed status. As of February 2001, there were 2,219 listed buildings in the district: 64 with Grade I status, 118 listed at Grade II* and 2,037 with Grade II status.

== Current places of worship ==
Current places of worship
Name	Image	Location	Denomination/ Affiliation	Grade	Notes	Refs
St John the Baptist's Church (More images)		Alresford; 51.090143°N 1.161022°W	Anglican	II*	A major fire which destroyed most of the town in 1689 also affected the church, which was rebuilt over the course of the next five years. Arthur Blomfield then carried out more restoration work in 1896–98. The church's Perpendicular Gothic appearance is largely anorthinttributable to that time. The church is of flint and stone and has an aisled nave of four bays, a chancel with side chapels and a three-stage tower, partly of brick.	
New Farm Chapel (More images)		Alresford; 51.087043°N 1.177909°W	Evangelical	II	This independent Evangelical church was founded in 1956. Worshippers initially met in houses, then moved to a building at New Farm on the edge of Alresford. The farmhouse, which is now in commercial use, dates from the 18th century; its former stables, attached on the south side, are now the chapel. This section is of flint with some brickwork and has arched windows. The chapel was registered for worship in January 1960 and for the solemnisation of marriages two years later.	
Alresford Methodist Church (More images)		Alresford; 51.088591°N 1.163979°W	Methodist	–	This new church opened in April 1981, prior to which Alresford's Methodists used the town's former Congregational chapel.	
St Gregory the Great's Church (More images)		Alresford; 51.087311°N 1.164134°W	Roman Catholic	–	The firm of Melhuish Wright and Evans designed this "adventurous" Modernist church, laid out in accordance with post-Vatican II liturgical planning (including a central altar and three banks of seating facing it), in 1967–68. It was registered in May 1969. The walls are of brown brick and the tall monopitch roof is tiled. A large eight-light window faces west. This part of Hampshire has a long Catholic tradition: locals previously worshipped at the chapel at Tichborne House, built in 1803 on the site of an older house.	
St Mary's Church (More images)		Avington; 51.087118°N 1.240520°W	Anglican	I	The church is wholly Georgian in date, having been built between 1768 and 1771 by an unknown architect, but its style is more Classical than Georgian. It has been described as "a gem among Hampshire churches" and "the best [church of its era] in the county". It replaced an earlier church, of which nothing remains, and cost £2,500, paid for by James Brydges, 3rd Duke of Chandos of Avington Park. The interior has a well preserved range of monuments and memorials.	
St James's Church (More images)		Beauworth; 51.031261°N 1.179290°W	Anglican	II	This church was built in 1838 in an early version of the Gothic Revival style, just before the influence of the Cambridge Camden Society redefined the architecture of parish churches. The architect is unknown. The nave and chancel form a single space with no chancel arch or other structural division, and has a gabled porch on the south side. The bell-cot, which is supported internally on columns, is of unusual form, with small gables on all four sides; it has two Mears & Co. bells. All windows are lancets. The walls are of flint and brick covered with render. The church was originally in the parish of Cheriton.	
All Saints Church (More images)		Bighton; 51.106427°N 1.129837°W	Anglican	I	The church dates mostly from the 12th and 13th centuries, but some of the fabric may be from the late Saxon or early Norman eras. The nave and chancel are in one with no division, and there are aisles and side chapels on both sides, a porch on the south side and a tower at the west end. Flint is the main building material. The windows are lancets and were mostly replaced or restored in the Victorian era. Some of the internal fittings are by Ninian Comper.	
St Nicholas' Church (More images)		Bishops Sutton; 51.084255°N 1.136138°W	Anglican	I	The church has 12th-century origins, most apparent in the nave, and has a long nave without aisles, a narrower chancel, side porches and a wooden bell-turret. Little trace remains of a former side chapel to the north of the chancel. Flint rubble is the main building material. The chancel was rebuilt in the 13th century. Inside, under the chancel arch, there is a memorial to the anatomist William Cowper.	
St Peter's Church (More images)		Bishop's Waltham; 50.955842°N 1.210337°W	Anglican	II*	This was one of several local churches founded by Bishop of Winchester Henry of Blois in the early 12th century. The original church, of which little survives, is believed to have been very large. Many alterations took place over the following centuries, particularly in the Victorian era when three restorations were carried out (the last of which, in 1894–97 by T.G. Jackson, was the most substantial). The tower collapsed in 1582 and was rebuilt over the next seven years. The nave has four-bay aisles on both sides.	
The King's Church (More images)		Bishop's Waltham; 50.954157°N 1.213014°W	Evangelical	–	This Evangelical congregation has occupied premises in the town's former Oddfellows Hall since March 1995.	
Bishops Waltham United Free Church (More images)		Bishop's Waltham; 50.953808°N 1.211512°W	Methodist and United Reformed Church	–	This brick-built church was registered in February 1910, initially for Primitive Methodists. In 1940, by which time it was dedicated to St Paul, it was recorded as having a capacity of 200. It later became a joint Methodist and United Reformed church. There had been a Congregational chapel in the town since 1862, (Note: The United Reformed Church denomination was formed from the amalgamation of the Congregational Church and the Presbyterian Church of England in 1972.) and a Primitive Methodist mission room was also recorded in 1908.	
Bishop's Waltham Christian Fellowship (More images)		Bishop's Waltham; 50.954165°N 1.211631°W	Open Brethren	–	The present building has its origins in a Gospel hall registered for worship in May 1915 and for marriages in March 1924.	
Church of Our Lady Queen of Apostles (More images)		Bishop's Waltham; 50.953515°N 1.221471°W	Roman Catholic	–	Mass was first celebrated in Bishop's Waltham in 1906 in a room at an inn. From 1912 the chapel at the Seminary of the White Fathers, a missionary society which occupied a house on Victoria Road, was used. The seminary closed in 1967, but some of its land was reserved for the construction of a parish church. This opened in 1977 and was superseded by the present larger church in 1997.	
St Nicholas' Church (More images)		Boarhunt; 50.870885°N 1.143824°W	Anglican	I	This is a complete Saxon church, possibly dating from the mid-1060s, with some 13th-century additions (including most of the lancet windows). A minor restoration was carried out in 1853. The remaining Saxon window and both doorways from that era are now blocked. The Victoria County History of Hampshire described it as "a very valuable specimen of a small pre-Conquest building".	
St Simon and St Jude's Church (More images)		Bramdean; 51.046455°N 1.131452°W	Anglican	II*	The church has Norman origins, visible in the nave and chancel: both the chancel arch and the north entrance to the nave have been dated to c. 1170. The south wall of the nave, which may have contained Norman fabric, was destroyed when a large transept was built in 1853. The chancel underwent "heavy" restoration in 1863, and the transept was extended five years later. The pulpit was moved to the church from St Barnabas' Church, West Silvertown, London. There are several monuments inside dating from the 17th, 18th and 19th centuries.	
Church in the Woods (More images)		Bramdean Common; 51.058926°N 1.099818°W	Anglican	–	This is a tin tabernacle erected in 1883 in a remote location on the common as a chapel of ease to St Simon and St Jude's Church. It was provided by that church's vicar at a cost of £75 so that the transient visitors to the common—particularly gypsies and charcoal burners—were able to worship. Two services per month are held during the summer months. The chapel has Gothic-style windows and a bell-cot with a spire.	
St Michael and All Angels Church (More images)		Cheriton; 51.052758°N 1.171116°W	Anglican	I	The oldest part of this large church, on an elevated site, is the tower arch: recent analysis shows it is from the mid-12th century, not the 13th century as reported in older sources. The rest of the building is largely 13th-century with some 15th-century additions (notably the four-light east window in the chancel, which was extended at this time). There are arcaded aisles on both sides of the nave. A fire in 1744 necessiatated some rebuilding work. The interior fittings are all 19th-century.	
St Andrew's Church (More images)		Chilcomb; 51.048392°N 1.277826°W	Anglican	I	This small, entirely Norman church, built between 1120 and 1140 approximately, stands high above the village. It is mostly unaltered and has a plain nave and chancel without aisles, a wooden bell-cot and a porch on the south side. The walls are of flint with some stonework, partly rendered. Some windows are original; others were altered in the 13th and 15th centuries. There are many old monuments and memorials inside.	
Holy Trinity Church (More images)		Colden Common; 50.991348°N 1.308389°W	Anglican	II	Architect George Guillaume designed this church in 1842–44 to serve as a chapel of ease to Owslebury, although it was later part of the parish of Twyford. It is of knapped flint and stone, and has no tower, spire or bell-cot (it originally had a bell-cot, but this does not survive). The short chancel has an apsidal end. The church is Gothic Revival in style, with lancet windows throughout. The nave is longer, having five bays.	
Colden Common Methodist Church (More images)		Colden Common; 50.997338°N 1.319048°W	Methodist	–	A datestone on the gable of this chapel shows that it was built in 1866 for Bible Christians, but it was rebuilt and re-registered in 1972.	
All Saints Church (More images)		Compton; 51.028283°N 1.334077°W	Anglican	I	The original nave and chancel date from the mid-12th century, but in 1904–05 architects and parishioners John Colson and G.H. Kitchin, under the guidance of W. D. Caröe, extended the church significantly to form a new nave and chancel. The original church now forms an aisle and a chapel. Some original windows and a Norman doorway survive in this part, and there are other windows of the 14th and 15th centuries. There is a large wooden bell-turret at the west end.	
Corhampton Church (More images)		Corhampton; 50.979077°N 1.132421°W	Anglican	II*	Although the east wall was rebuilt in brick in the 19th century after the original wall and part of the chancel collapsed, and a vestry and porch have been added to the north and south sides respectively, the church largely retains its Saxon appearance. It is believed to have been built in the early 11th century, possibly as early as 1020. T.G. Jackson carried out some restoration in 1905. The east window is Perpendicular Gothic in style. "An impressive scheme" of 12th- or 13th-century wall paintings depicting scenes from the life of St Swithun survive inside, having been restored in 1968.	
St Mary's Church (More images)		Crawley; 51.111367°N 1.395477°W	Anglican	I	The church has a nave with aisles on both sides, a porch, vestry and organ chamber – all of which are 19th-century additions, as is the chancel, rebuilt in 1887 to the design of T.E. Williams – and a tower at the west end. There are Norman fragments inside, especially on the chancel arch, but not much of the original 12th-century building remains. The nave and its aisles date from the 14th century and have Perpendicular Gothic detailing. The font is in the same style and is made of clunch. The stained glass windows are by Hardman & Co., including a "splendid" representation of the Te Deum in the east window.	
Crawley Gospel Hall (More images)		Crawley; 51.111367°N 1.395477°W	Open Brethren	–	This was built in 1901 (although not formally registered for worship until 1939) and was substantially extended in the late 20th century.	
St Peter's Church (More images)		Curdridge; 50.921965°N 1.249915°W	Anglican	II	This was built in 1887 to the design of T.G. Jackson to replace a church of 1835 and was originally part of the parish of St Peter's Church, Bishop's Waltham. The tower was added in 1894 and has a pyramidal cap hidden behind its parapet. The church has a chancel and nave with no aisles; the walls are of flint dressed with stone. The overall style is Perpendicular Gothic Revival with some elements of the Decorated Gothic style, particularly in the window tracery.	
All Saints Church (More images)		Denmead; 50.904545°N 1.064958°W	Anglican	II	Historically, Denmead was part of the large parish of Hambledon. Its small church, Early English Gothic Revival in style, was built in 1880 to the design of James Fowler and C.R. Pink. It is of flint with some stonework and brickwork, and consists of a nave and chancel, south porch and bell-cot. The church was substantially altered inside and refurnished in 1996–97, and the old chancel is now a side chapel. There is some 21st-century stained glass in the windows. The font is 14th-century and was originally in Hambledon parish church.	
Brethren Meeting Room (More images)		Denmead; 50.899989°N 1.077327°W	Plymouth Brethren Christian Church	–	In 2016, a bungalow was converted into a local meeting room for members of the Plymouth Brethren Christian Church connected with the main meeting hall for the area at Horndean. Such bungalow conversions, often in rural or suburban areas, are increasingly common in the 21st century in this religious group.	
St Mary and All Saints Church (More images)		Droxford; 50.960092°N 1.136006°W	Anglican	I	This has been described as a "typical ... Hampshire village church" of the Norman era. The nave and chancel are mostly 12th-century; the aisle and chapel on the north side date from about 1200; the equivalents on the south side are from slightly later in the 13th century; and some rebuilding work was carried out in the 14th and 15th centuries. The tower dates from 1599, as shown by a plaque above the doorway to the stair-turret; it is not certain whether it was added then or is a rebuild of an existing tower. The windows are largely Perpendicular Gothic in style. The church had galleries until they were removed in a restoration of 1846–47. The pulpit was moved here from St Matthew's Church, Denmark Hill, London.	
Holy Cross Church (More images)		Durley; 50.950039°N 1.281909°W	Anglican	II*	This "pleasing hamlet church", with a chancel, aisleless nave and spire-topped bell-turret, is largely 13th-century (with 14th-century transepts) but was altered in 1879 by John Colson, who built the buttresses, porch and vestry and gave the building its present roughcast exterior and plain lancet windows. The interior is mostly Victorian as well, although the Purbeck Marble font has been dated to the 12th century. The bell-turret has three bells, two of which have the date 1730.	
All Saints Church (More images)		East Stratton; 51.157409°N 1.227500°W	Anglican	II	Thomas Baring, 1st Earl of Northbrook of Stratton Park, paid the £4,160 required for the construction of a new church at East Stratton to replace one in the grounds of the estate 1/2 mile (0.80 km) to the north. It was designed by Thomas Graham Jackson, who was also responsible for the church at nearby Northington, between 1887 and 1888 and has a single-aisled nave, chancel, tower and "elaborate" porch on the south side. The style is largely Perpendicular Gothic Revival. The Earl died in 1904 and is commemorated by an Arts and Crafts-style monument inside.	
St Mary's Church (More images)		Easton; 51.087368°N 1.274494°W	Anglican	I	The church dates almost entirely from the 1170s and has been described as "rewarding" and a "very valuable example of a small parish church" of that era—although its exterior was restored in the same (Norman) style between 1866 and 1872 by Henry Woodyer. The vaulted chancel is elaborate and well-detailed, with three round-arched windows (restored by Woodyer) with Norman zigzag moulding and Victorian stained glass by Hardman & Co., and the much plainer nave retains two original windows. The walls are of flint and stone.	
St Peter and St Paul's Church (More images)		Exton; 50.985742°N 1.127453°W	Anglican	II	This church has 13th-century origins, but its present appearance dates mostly from a restoration in 1847. At that time the windows and nave roof were renewed, a porch added and the gallery removed, and the walls were rebuilt with knapped flint. The nave has no aisles, and there is a vestry, porch and timber bell-turret with a shingled pyramidal cap.	
St John's Church (More images)		Farley Chamberlayne; 51.044978°N 1.434557°W	Anglican	I	There is no village here, and the manor house was demolished in the 19th century, so the church stands alone in fields near a farm. It is a simple building of the late mid- to late 12th century with a chancel, wider nave and wooden bell-turret with weatherboarding. There is a Norman doorway on the south side. A mostly internal restoration carried out in about 1760 was mostly undone in 1910, and more work was carried out in 1952. There are some 17th-century monuments to members of the St John family, successors of whom became the St John-Mildmay baronets.	
St Peter and St Paul's Church (More images)		Hambledon; 50.932552°N 1.081639°W	Anglican	I	This "textbook of medieval church architecture" has work from every century from the 11th to the 15th. The original Saxon church, consisting of a nave and a short chancel, first had its nave rebuilt in the 12th century; the chancel was then doubled in length in the early 13th, before a whole new church was built around this later in the century. The present nave consists of the old one and the chancel, long aisles were added on both sides, and a tower was built (this was reconstructed in 1794). The tall porch and vestry were built between the late 14th and the early 15th centuries.	
Hambledon Methodist Church (More images)		Hambledon; 50.930852°N 1.086801°W	Methodist	–	This flint and brick chapel was founded in 1864 and was originally registered as Ebenezer Chapel. It was licensed for the solemnisation of marriages in February 1956.	
St Swithun's Church (More images)		Headbourne Worthy; 51.085167°N 1.305484°W	Anglican	I	The church was founded in the 11th century and retains much fabric from c. 1030, as well as from the 13th, 14th and 15th centuries. In the mid-1860s it was one of many Anglican churches restored by the architect George Edmund Street. "Of international value" is the greater than lifesize rood carved above the doorway, defaced in the 16th century but still clearly representing the crucified Christ flanked by Our Lady and St John. Above, the Hand of God emerges from a cloud: this part remains intact.	
All Saints Church (More images)		Hinton Ampner; 51.044185°N 1.149480°W	Anglican	II*	The Saxon layout of this church survives, although a substantial restoration was carried out in the Victorian era. The chancel had also been rebuilt in the 13th century. The walls are of flint and ashlar and have lancet windows, mostly inserted in the 19th century but including some restored 13th0century examples. There are memorials inside to members of the Stewkley family, who were in possession of the manor for many years.	
St James's Church (More images)		Hunton; 51.153992°N 1.313435°W	Anglican	II	Hunton was an outlying part of Crawley parish from 1291 or earlier until 1919, and the church here was dependent on it. The building is largely 13th-century but was rebuilt around 1500 and then altered again in both the 18th and the 19th centuries. The church is simple: it has a nave, chancel and bell-turret, flint and stone walls and a tiled roof.	
All Saints Church (More images)		Hursley; 51.025333°N 1.391347°W	Anglican	II*	John Keble, a leader of the Oxford Movement, was curate and then vicar here for much of the mid-19th century, and the church was rebuilt to his taste in 1846–48 to the design of J.P. Harrison at a cost of £6,000. It is Decorated Gothic Revival in style, of clunch, stone and flint, with an aisled nave, chancel with two chapels and arcades, and a tower which survives from the original 14th-century church.	
St John's Church (More images)		Itchen Abbas; 51.091405°N 1.238121°W	Anglican	II	The 12th-century church was rebuilt in a Neo-Norman style between 1861 and 1863 by a local architect, William Coles. An original doorway from the Norman era was moved to the north transept of the cruciform church. Some early 20th-century fittings were removed in alterations carried out in 2008–09, but the late Victorian stained glass windows by littletonare still in situ.	
St Andrew's Church (More images)		Kilmeston; 51.033477°N 1.158014°W	Anglican	II	The church is a "simple rectangle" of the 13th century, Early English in style, with an undivided nave and chancel. It was rebuilt in 1772 and restored in 1865. The present bell-cot dates from 1911 but holds a bell of 1772. A south aisle was added in 1875, and the porch on the north side is of a similar age.	
St Mary's Church (More images)		Kings Worthy; 51.088256°N 1.297633°W	Anglican	II*	The village has been suburbanised as a result of the growth of Winchester, and little remains from the medieval church: it was enlarged three times in the 19th century (principally by John Colson in 1864), and a large extension for community use weas built in 1999. The chancel has a chapel on the south side, and the nave also has a south aisle. The tower at the west end is 15th-century, and the font is of a similar age or slightly older.	
St Catherine's Church (More images)		Littleton; 51.093619°N 1.353732°W	Anglican	II*	The dedication of this church was changed to St Mary Magdalene at some point before 1908 before reverting to its historic name. It has 12th-century origins, and its "tall narrow proportions suggest c. 1100", but the present appearance is attributable to restorations in the 1880s and 1890s by T.E. Williams (including the construction of a vestry and aisle). The font is of Purbeck Marble and is late-12th century.	
St Swithun's Church (More images)		Martyr Worthy; 51.091992°N 1.265044°W	Anglican	II*	The church's Norman origins (it dates from about 1140) can be seen in the north and south doorways, which feature different types of Norman decoration. New Perpendicular Gothic windows were inserted in the 15th century, and the church was rebuilt, enlarged and given a Neo-Norman apsidal chancel in 1865 by architect John Colson. There is stained glass of 1897 by Lavers, Barraud and Westlake. The flint and stonework of the walls is partly rendered.	
St Andrew's Church (More images)		Meonstoke; 50.978108°N 1.130210°W	Anglican	II*	A local architect, W.H. Hunt, restored the church in 1870–71, most significantly by rebuilding the chancel arch. The building has 13th-century origins, though: the chancel could be as old as 1230, and the arch does retain some "very pretty" original details. The tower was added in the 15th century and was given its present two-stage timber cap in around 1900. The four-bay nave has arcades and aisles on both sides.	
St Mary's Church (More images)		Micheldever; 51.149073°N 1.268381°W	Anglican	II*	The "arresting", "shockingly odd" appearance of this church is due to a major rebuild by George Dance the Younger in 1806–08. This cost £10,000 and was paid for by Sir Francis Baring, 1st Baronet of nearby Stratton Park, which Dance had also built. The original, 13th-century nave was replaced by a tall octagonal brick structure. Inside there are various memorials by John Flaxman to members of the Baring family. John Colson carried out more work and a general restoration in 1880–81. There was a church here by 903; it founded four other churches locally in the Saxon era.	
Gospel Hall (More images)		Micheldever; 51.123992°N 1.264611°W	Plymouth Brethren Christian Church	–	This is the main Brethren meeting room in the area. Such buildings are also known as "city rooms" and have subsidiary "local rooms" associated with them. Planning permission was granted in 2006 for the building to be erected on the site of a derelict, fire-damaged pub. A temporary meeting room was put up first, then the present building was registered in 2020. Its design is characteristic of large meeting rooms built in rural areas in the 21st century.	
Morestead Church (More images)		Morestead; 51.026486°N 1.274567°W	Anglican	II	This is a very small mid-12th-century church almost hidden behind a hedge above the adjacent lane. A "cottagey" schoolroom (now a vestry) was built on to the front in 1833, and John Colson restored the whole church in 1873 in a Neo-Norman style. There is a chancel, unaisled nave, porch and bell-cot. The church appears never to have had a dedication.	
Holy Trinity Church (More images)		Newtown; 50.910233°N 1.132026°W	Anglican	II	This church, originally a chapel of ease in the parish of Soberton, was the first new church designed by John Colson. It was built between 1847 and 1850 in the Early English Gothic Revival style of flint and stone, with a tall, aisleless nave and short, lower chancel. The only other features are a porch and a bell-turret at the west end. The parish was formed in 1851 with territory taken from Hambledon and Soberton parishes. Colson also designed the nearby school and parsonage.	
St John the Evangelist's Church (More images)		Northington; 51.132710°N 1.194792°W	Anglican	II*	Thomas Graham Jackson, who was working on construction of the church at nearby East Stratton at the same time, designed this new church in the Perpendicular Gothic Revival style between 1887 and 1890 to replace an older building nearby which was then demolished. It stands on a hillside above the village and is a "typical estate church", being associated with The Grange and paid for by that mansion's owner Alexander Baring, 1st Baron Ashburton. The church represents an early use of concrete in ecclesiastical architecture, but the walls are faced with flint and stone in a chequerboard pattern.	
St Mary the Virgin's Church (More images)		Old Alresford; 51.099202°N 1.161434°W	Anglican	II*	Nothing survives of the medieval church here: it was "totally rebuilt" in 1753 and altered again in 1769 (with the addition of the tower) and 1862 (when John Colson undertook a substantial restoration, remodelling and extension, adding a transept, vestry and new lancet windows). Rev. George Sumner, later the suffragan Bishop of Guildford, was the vicar who commissioned Colson's restoration; his wife Mary Sumner, founder of the Mothers' Union, is commemorated by an oak plaque in the nave.	
St Mark's Church (More images)		Oliver's Battery; 51.047934°N 1.346899°W	Anglican	–	Oliver's Battery was founded as a smallholders' community after World War I. In about 1925 a secondhand Army hut was bought for £10 to serve as a combined church, community centre and village hall. It was damaged by a storm in 1929, taken back by the Army again for use during World War II and by the 1950s was dilapidated. A prefabricated Reema construction hall was purchased for £4,000 to replace it; it was put up on the site in 1956 and dedicated to St Mark at a ceremony attended by Bishop of Southampton Kenneth Lamplugh.	
St Stephen's Church (More images)		Oliver's Battery; 51.052475°N 1.347166°W	Roman Catholic	–	This octagonal church, designed by Alan Stewart, opened in 1969 as a chapel of ease to St Peter's Church, Winchester. It was registered for worship and for marriages on 30 May of that year. It cost £32,000 and has variegated brickwork and a metal roof with a prominent small spire. Each wall has a band of clerestorey windows.	
St Matthew's Church (More images)		Otterbourne; 51.003056°N 1.350439°W	Anglican	II*	There was an old church in this parish—built in the 13th century on a site further south—but it has been demolished (the chancel survived into the early 20th century). The present building dates from 1837–38 and was designed by Owen Browne Carter of Winchester in collaboration with William Yonge, the local squire and father of Charlotte Mary Yonge. It is in a simplified Gothic Revival style and has walls of bluish brick. Thomas Henry Wyatt extended the church in 1875, adding an arcaded north aisle and an apse. Some of the stained glass is by James Powell and Sons.	
St Peter's Church (More images)		Ovington; 51.081008°N 1.200593°W	Anglican	II*	John Colson provided a new flint-built church here in 1865–67 on the site of its predecessor, which was first documented in 1284. The chancel has transepts on both sides and a vestry, the nave is aisleless, and there is a tower with a porch built into the lowest stage and an elaborate timber upper stage below the tiled spire. The bells are all 19th-century. An "ancient" stoup has been inserted in a wall inside.	
St Andrew's Church (More images)		Owslebury; 51.007646°N 1.267494°W	Anglican	II*	The oldest surviving parts of this large church are late-13th century or 14th-century. The oldest work, restored less in the Victorian era than other parts, can be found in the chancel, which is much narrower than the nave. The tower was rebuilt in the 17th century (there is a plaque showing 1675) and its lancet windows were "faithfully" renewed in about 1890. The church had earlier been extended by architect W. Gover: this work was carried out between 1835 and 1836.	
St John the Baptist's Church (More images)		Shedfield; 50.916444°N 1.202421°W	Anglican	II	A church of 1829 was taken down in 1875 and work began on a new building in another part of the churchyard. It was designed by John Colson, whose parents lived in the village, and was largely completed in 1880, although additions were made over the next 13 years: successively the north transept, the tower and the north aisle. The overall style is Early English Gothic Revival with some Decorated Gothic-style windows. The "surpris[ing] ... interesting and original" interior is polychromatic, featuring red, yellow, blue and black brickwork. All of the internal fittings are Victorian.	
Shirrell Heath Methodist Church (More images)		Shirrell Heath; 50.922440°N 1.189217°W	Methodist	–	The brick-built chapel opened in 1864 as one of three Primitive Methodist chapels in the parish of Droxford, although it was later transferred to Shedfield parish. Formal registration for worship and marriages followed in 1931.	
St Peter's Church (More images)		Soberton; 50.947404°N 1.133586°W	Anglican	I	This large and complex church was built over a long period of time. Nothing survives of the Saxon church which occupied the site, but its plan has been discerned: it had an aisleless nave and chancel, and would have resembled the church at nearby Boarhunt. The north arcade was built in the 1180s; an aisle followed, and this was extended soon afterwards, followed by the construction of another aisle on the south side, a triple-arched tower and, later in that century, the south transept—described as "the finest part of the church". The tower was taken down in the 16th century and replaced in a Perpendicular Gothic style. Some restoration work was carried out in 1881, and all the internal fittings date from then.	
St Margaret's Church (More images)		South Wonston; 51.119650°N 1.331141°W	Anglican	–	A tin tabernacle was replaced in 1996 by the present church, which is an integral part of the primary school which was built at the same time to the design of the Hampshire County Architects' Department. The church forms the northern part of the building; the point where the school adjoins is marked by a short tower. The sanctuary is top-lit and has a monopitch roof; the main body of the church projects like an apse.	
Brethren Meeting Room (More images)		South Wonston; 51.124997°N 1.326794°W	Plymouth Brethren Christian Church	–	This is a purpose-built local meeting room associated with the "city room" at Micheldever. Recently built Brethren meeting rooms like this "increasingly reflect aspects of local vernacular architecture" through their use of materials.	
St James's Church (More images)		Southwick; 50.873899°N 1.111729°W	Anglican	I	Southwick Priory, belonging to the Augustinian canons, was established here in the mid-12th century, and this church was built outside its walls as a subsidiary chapel soon afterwards (or perhaps even before the priory moved here from Portchester). Most of the building dates from then, but the chancel is partly 13th-century and there is 14th-century work in the nave. After the Dissolution of the monasteries John Whyte, who had taken possession of the priory and bought the manor, rebuilt the church in 1555, (Note: The date of 1566 given in the Victoria County History and many subsequent published histories has been found by later research to be incorrect.) making it "a rare example of a post-Reformation Tudor church".	
St Stephen's Church (More images)		Sparsholt; 51.078567°N 1.380053°W	Anglican	II*	William Butterfield undertook a significant restoration in 1882–83, extending the chancel, adding to it an organ chamber and vestry, and building the north aisle. The original building was a simple aisleless church with just a nave and chancel, built in the 12th century. At the end of that century the south aisle was built, and in the 14th century the chancel was widened. The tower was added in the following century; its heavy buttressing is later. The walls are of flint dressed with stone.	
St Luke's Church (More images)		Stanmore; 51.054021°N 1.334149°W	Anglican	–	This "minimalist Gothic" brick church was designed by Cecil Evans in 1960–62 for the Stanmore suburb of Winchester. The 18th-century font in which Thomas Hardy was baptised has been moved here from its original location at St Michael's Church in Stinsford, Dorset.	
Level 10 Church (More images)		Stanmore; 51.052378°N 1.332964°W	Assemblies of God	–	Stanmore Mission Hall (the Perks Memorial Mission) was registered in a building on this site in February 1933. It became Stanmore Evangelical Free Church (May 1949–April 1991); then the present building was constructed in 1990–91 and the name Winchester Family Church was adopted (this was registered in April 1991). This was a non-denominational Evangelical church. It moved to the Middle Brook Centre in central Winchester in 1997, and in April 2013 the Stanmore church was re-registered by its present Pentecostal group.	
St Michael's Church (More images)		Stoke Charity; 51.150623°N 1.302546°W	Anglican	I	The oldest parts of this complex flint-and-brick church date from the 12th-century: most likely c. 1190, although a date of 1160 has been suggested for the chancel arch and the arcade on the north side of the nave. The chancel was rebuilt in the first half of the 13th century, and two lancet windows were installed around that time; of the 15th century are its north chapel and three-light east window. There is no tower, but the shingled bell-turret on the roof, although restored in 1849, retains some 14th-century fabric. The interior has a large collection of medieval monuments, many to the [de] Hampton family who owned the manor: "no other small Hampshire church['s collection] is [so] full and richly varied".	
St Barnabas' Church (More images)		Swanmore; 50.944221°N 1.181027°W	Anglican	II	Benjamin Ferrey designed this church in 1844–46 for what was then an outlying part of Droxford parish. John Colson added the apse in 1860, and Ewan Christian designed the south aisle, tower and shingled bell-turret in 1876–77. The church is a large flint and stone Neo-Norman building with some Early English Gothic Revival-style windows. Alfred Waterhouse designed the "elaborate" octagonal marble pulpit in 1880. A large church hall was added in 1991–93.	
Swanmore Methodist Church (More images)		Swanmore; 50.942179°N 1.179570°W	Methodist	–	This brick chapel was originally one of three Primitive Methodist chapels in the parish of Droxford, and the earliest: it was built in 1862 or 1863. It was registered for the solemnisation of marriages in December 1942.	
St Andrew's Church (More images)		Tichborne; 51.068853°N 1.189712°W	Anglican	I	The flint-built church stands on a hill northwest of the village and retains its 11th-century chancel and the original overall plan. The present nave dates from the 12th century and has aisles on both sides; that on the north side serves as the chantry chapel of the Tichborne family. There are also various monuments to members of the family. Modest reordering and restoration was carried out by John Colson in 1909. Jacobean box pews survive inside.	
St Margaret's Chapel (More images)		Tichborne; 51.069967°N 1.183090°W	Roman Catholic	II	Tichborne House was built in about 1803, replacing the older seat of the Tichborne family which had existed since the 13th century. A Catholic mission at the old house was founded in 1633, and a chapel (registered in 1840) occupies part of the southwestern range of the present house.	
St Mary the Virgin's Church (More images)		Twyford; 51.022936°N 1.315041°W	Anglican	II*	Alfred Waterhouse rebuilt the 12th-century church between 1875 and 1878 in the Perpendicular Gothic Revival style, reusing some material such as the east window (reset in the south chapel) and a "nicely moulded" doorway. The walls are of knapped flint with bands of red brick. The nave has aisles on both sides, and the chancel is likewise flanked by north and south chapels. The entrance porch is set into the lowest stage of the tower, which adjoins one end the north aisle. The Purbeck Marble font is 12th-century.	
Twyford Methodist Chapel (More images)		Twyford; 51.016835°N 1.319272°W	Methodist	–	This brick chapel was built for Bible Christian Methodists in 1866 and later became part of the United Methodist Church. In 1940 the capacity was recorded as 100.	
Blessed Mary Church (More images)		Upham; 50.982416°N 1.234023°W	Anglican	II	The present appearance of the church dates from George Edmund Street's comprehensive restoration in 1877–81, although he reused the east window of the chancel and retained some 13th-century work inside. The church was built in that century but had its tower added in the early 18th century; its bells date from later that century. The north aisle is much wider than that on the south side and its arcade has much thinner piers. The tower is of red and blue brick but the rest of the walls are flint and stone.	
Waltham Chase Methodist Church (More images)		Waltham Chase; 50.935580°N 1.203811°W	Methodist	–	Land was secured for this chapel in October 1868 and it opened in March 1869 with an original capacity of 80. The village grew substantially in the late 20th century, and an extension was built in 1980. Further growth led to a much larger rebuild, completed in November 1997, and the church was formally registered for the solemnisation of marriages at that time.	
Church of Our Lady (More images)		Warnford; 50.999993°N 1.114248°W	Anglican	I	The manor house has been demolished, but the church stands in its extensive grounds on the other side of the River Meon from the small village. It was founded in the late 11th century and retains much Norman fabric, including the "assertive" and tall 12th-century tower with unusual circular openings, also seen at nearby All Saints Church, East Meon. The Decorated Gothic-style east window dates from 1377. Little restoration has been carried out; John Colson was responsible for some work in 1906, principally to the roof and the seating arrangements.	
St Barnabas' Church (More images)		Weeke; 51.076434°N 1.336549°W	Anglican	–	Weeke was a large parish with a very small church, St Matthew, and another (St Paul) in the southeast corner. Postwar housing development in the northwest of the parish necessitated the opening of an additional church, which has had its own parish since 1989. Roger Pinckney designed St Barnabas' in 1966–67, a large, tall red-brick building of nave, chancel and sanctuary at a lower level. It is "quite [a] commanding" building with a copper roof and flèche.	
St Matthew's Church (More images)		Weeke; 51.071725°N 1.333599°W	Anglican	II	This small rendered building, previously dedicated to Our Lady, is the original church of the formerly separate village of Weeke, now a suburb of Winchester. The aisleless nave is Norman, dating from the first quarter of the 12th century; the Early English-style chancel is 13th-century; and Owen Browne Carter designed the vestry. Until the 15th century the church was a chapel of ease to a now demolished church in Winchester.	
Wesley Methodist Church (More images)		Weeke; 51.074665°N 1.335821°W	Methodist	–	This Methodist church was built to serve the Weeke estate. It was registered for worship in October 1956 and for marriages in December 1957.	
St John the Evangelist's Church (More images)		West Meon; 51.012904°N 1.089320°W	Anglican	II	An old church which was recorded in the Domesday Book was abandoned, demolished and replaced by the current Decorated Gothic Revival building in 1843–46. It was designed by George Gilbert Scott at a cost of £12,000 and is "remarkably large" for the size of the village. Flint and Caen stone are the building materials. The tower at the west end is particularly prominent. Charles Nicholson reordered the interior in 1924, and more work was carried out in 1970. Thomas Lord, founder of Lord's cricket ground, is buried in the churchyard; the Marylebone Cricket Club erected a monument to him in 1951.	
St Nicholas' Church (More images)		Wickham; 50.899629°N 1.183261°W	Anglican	II*	There were two rounds of Victorian restoration at this church, in 1862–63 and 1872–77, the first of which amounted to a near total rebuilding. Some features survive from the original 12th- and 13th-century building, though. The nave has no aisles, but the chancel has transepts on each side and a south chapel. The tower has prominent buttresses and a "fancy bell-stage" with a shingled spire above; these were added during the 1860s rebuild. It replaced a simpler wooden bell-turret. The interior was reordered in the 1950s by the firm of Potter and Hare.	
Al-Mahdi Centre (Wessex Jamaat)		Wickham; 50.876324°N 1.217721°W	Muslim	–	This was registered for followers of Shia Islam in July 2015.	
Chapel of St Thomas More (More images)		Wickham; 50.900872°N 1.197047°W	Roman Catholic	–	Park Place is an 18th-century mansion on the outskirts of Wickham. It became a Catholic retreat and pastoral centre in 1969, and this chapel was added in that year. It is a "dramatic" design by T.K. Makins, of brick and with an elliptical layout. The groups of small windows are set in stone surrounds. It was registered for public worship and for the solemnisation of marriages in February 1998.	
All Saints Church (More images)		Winchester; 51.058232°N 1.303596°W	Anglican	–	This serves the Highcliffe area of east Winchester, which was originally in the parish of Chilcomb. The design by John Loughborough Pearson dates from 1885, but work did not start until 1889 and the church opened in 1891. Construction was eventually completed in 1897, at a total cost of £5,000, and the intended tower was not built. It is a flint and brick building with a four-bay nave, north aisle, lancet windows and some stained glass by James Powell and Sons.	
Christ Church (More images)		Winchester; 51.060304°N 1.321997°W	Anglican	–	Ewan Christian designed this "large and serious" church in the Early English Gothic Revival style in 1859–61. The tower and spire, not completed until 1904, form a landmark. The stained glass may be by Heaton, Butler and Bayne. The chancel has a polygonal apse and a large vestry, and the nave has aisles on both sides.	
Holy Trinity Church (More images)		Winchester; 51.064813°N 1.311251°W	Anglican	II*	The site for this church was bought in February 1852 for £900 and work took place in 1853–54. It opened in July 1854. Henry Woodyer designed the church, which cost £4,500, in the Decorated Gothic Revival style. It is a large church: the original capacity was 900, the nave is of seven bays, and there are aisles on both sides. Extensions were built in 1894, also by Woodyer. The church is considered one of his "important early work[s]".	
St Bartholomew's Church (More images)		Winchester; 51.068942°N 1.314299°W	Anglican	II*	Members of the now vanished Hyde Abbey provided this church in the early 12th century to serve the pilgrims, abbey laity and the village of Hyde, now part of Winchester. The tower was added in 1541 after the abbey was destroyed using stones and rubble from the demolished building. The oldest surviving part is one wall of the nave and the south doorway, dating from about 1130; four rounds of Victorian restoration, the last two by John Colson, gave the church its present appearance. There is stained glass by Clayton and Bell (1894) and Joseph Edward Nuttgens (1948).	
St Faith's Church (Hospital of St Cross) (More images)		Winchester; 51.047080°N 1.322023°W	Anglican	I	The Hospital, an almshouse, was founded in 1136 by Henry of Blois and still provides accommodation for elderly men. A village called St Cross developed around it and was served by a church dedicated to St Faith. After this was demolished in 1507, the Hospital chapel became the parish church, a status it retains in the 21st century. It is a good example of the "Transitional" style, representing the transition from Norman to Gothic architecture, and is a very tall and long building (more than 100 feet (30 m) in length). It was complete in its present form by the 15th century, and only a modest restoration by William Butterfield has taken place since.	
St John the Baptist's Church (More images)		Winchester; 51.062302°N 1.306364°W	Anglican	I	The church is a single-cell building, with nave and chancel in one. It dates from 1142, but the earliest surviving work is of the 1180s. On the south side is a single "very large and spectacular" 13th-century window; other windows are later and Perpendicular Gothic in style. The "stout" tower has a castellated top. The east end abuts the street and has three gables, representing the nave and the north and south aisles. The south porch was added in the late 19th century, and another small extension was built in 2006 during a scheme of reordering.	
St John's Chapel (More images)		Winchester; 51.061495°N 1.309240°W	Anglican	I	This chapel was attached to St John's Hospital, an almshouse, and is largely 13th-century with some 15th-century details. All windows are lancets.	
St Lawrence's Church (More images)		Winchester; 51.062509°N 1.314857°W	Anglican	II	Other buildings surround this church on all sides, so only the tower can be seen (this is, nevertheless, "an important element in the townscape" in its central location between the High Street and the cathedral). It dates from the 15th century and has a castellated upper stage. The church has 13th-century origins and retains a doorway of that era, but the "simple" interior was restored in the late 17th century after a period when the building was used as a school. More restoration was carried out by John Colson in 1847–48, and a fire in 1978 necessitated further work over the following two years.	
St Paul's Church (More images)		Winchester; 51.066717°N 1.321180°W	Anglican	II	This was built as a chapel of ease to St Matthew's Church at Weeke to serve 19th-century housing in the southeast of the parish close to Winchester railway station. It was built over a period of nearly 17 years to the design of John Colson and was later completed by his son, again over a period of several years. First came the chancel (1870–72), then the nave and transepts followed in 1889 when enough money was available. A north aisle was added in 1902, and a south aisle and porch were built in 1910. A tower was planned but was never built. It is a flint-built church in the Decorated Gothic Revival style.	
St Swithun-upon-Kingsgate Church (More images)		Winchester; 51.059175°N 1.314426°W	Anglican	I	The church stands on top of the Kingsgate, one of the two surviving medieval gateways in Winchester. There was a church here in the 13th century, and the original Kingsgate was 12th-century; it was replaced in the late 14th century, and the church in its present form is mostly 16th-century; the "charming timber-framed and tile-hung stairway" from street level dates from that time. John Colson restored the church in 1853.	
Winchester Cathedral (More images)		Winchester; 51.060715°N 1.313134°W	Anglican	I	Of the original 7th-century cathedral (the Old Minster) and the adjacent 10th-century New Minster very little survives: work on the present building began in 1079 by Walkelin, the first Norman Bishop of Winchester, and it was consecrated 14 years later when the east end was completed. Various remodelling, extensions and repairs were carried out over the centuries, but the cathedral was in danger of collapse by the early 20th century. Thomas Graham Jackson undertook major repairs and reordering between 1905 and 1912. The 11th-century transepts are the oldest surviving structures.	
Winchester Baptist Church (More images)		Winchester; 51.066283°N 1.316081°W	Baptist	–	The chapel is Classical in style with round-arched windows and doorways. It has a rendered façade hiding brickwork, two-storey pilasters on the front and side elevations and a shallow open pediment. It was built between 1864 and 1865 and was registered for marriages in November 1869; the interior was remodelled in 1978.	
Winchester Christian Science Society (More images)		Winchester; 51.065343°N 1.317596°W	Christian Scientist	–	This was built in 1848 to the design of John Colson as St Thomas's National School. Since May 1949 it has been registered for worship by Christian Scientists.	
Hope Church Winchester (More images)		Winchester; 51.063614°N 1.311759°W	Evangelical	–	This has its origins in the Stanmore Mission Hall, a non-denominational church founded on the Stanmore estate in 1928. The original chapel, built in 1932, was demolished and rebuilt in 1991. Further rapid growth led to Winchester Family Church, as it was known by this stage, purchasing the former Ritz cinema (built in 1939–40) on Middle Brook Street and converting it into a church. It opened in November 1997 and its name was changed in 2014 to Hope Church Winchester. It was registered for the solemnisation of marriages in April 2007.	
Winchester Evangelical Church (More images)		Winchester; 51.057015°N 1.305690°W	Evangelical	–	Like the church on the Stanmore estate, the church in its present form was established by a charitable trust founded by sisters Louisa and Emma Perks to support Evangelical churches in the Winchester area. It serves the Highcliffe estate in the east of the city. The present building was registered with the name Perks' Memorial Mission in November 1950, but the trust had bought it in 1932. It opened as a mission hall in May 1884 and was later used by the Open Brethren congregation which no occupies the Welcome Gospel Hall.	
Kingdom Hall (More images)		Winchester; 51.064925°N 1.302709°W	Jehovah's Witnesses	–	This Kingdom Hall serves the Winchester Congregation of Jehovah's Witnesses and was registered for worship and for marriages in November 1988.	
Church of Jesus Christ of Latter-day Saints, Winchester Ward Chapel (More images)		Winchester; 51.057209°N 1.322366°W	Latter-day Saint	–	This meetinghouse for the local ward of The Church of Jesus Christ of Latter-day Saints dates from 1975.	
Winchester United Church (More images)		Winchester; 51.064003°N 1.316369°W	Methodist and United Reformed Church	II	The firm of Poulton and Woodman designed this chapel in 1852–53 for a community of Congregationalists who had originated in the late 17th century and who had initially held Presbyterian views. They sold their old chapel on Parchment Street to Primitive Methodists. In 1974 Winchester's two Methodist congregations united with worshippers here to form the present "United Church". The yellow-brick Gothic Revival chapel was built between the walls and the entrance of the former county jail.	
The Welcome Gospel Hall (More images)		Winchester; 51.061617°N 1.311239°W	Open Brethren	–	This was established in the late 19th century as the Winchester Soldiers' Home and Mission and was given its present "charming" appearance in 1898–99. The façade is a mixture of flint panels and yellow brickwork, a first-floor window projects prominently over one of the entrances, and there are battlements all round the roof. The present congregation of Open Brethren, who registered the building for their use in August 1924, had previously used the mission hall in Highcliffe which is now Winchester Evangelical Church.	
Brethren Meeting Room		Winchester; 51.074975°N 1.321995°W	Plymouth Brethren Christian Church	–	This is one of the "local rooms" serving the area's Plymouth Brethren community, whose main hall is at Micheldever. It was registered in 1971, replacing the former meeting room at Brassey Road.	
Friends Meeting House (More images)		Winchester; 51.059938°N 1.309421°W	Quaker	II	In the 20th century, the adaptation of secular buildings (usually houses) for religious use by Quakers became common. "One of the most notable examples" in Britain is the reuse of the former rectory of St Laurence's Church, an "imposing" three-storey Georgian townhouse built in 1773, which was converted into a meeting house in 1973 and registered in October 1978. A large-scale refurbishment took place in 2013. Quaker meetings, which had last taken place in Winchester in the 18th century, restarted in 1940 but used various premises until 1973. The upper floors of the building are mostly used for housing vulnerable people on a short-term basis.	
Hyde Street Chapel (More images)		Winchester; 51.067485°N 1.315452°W	Reformed Baptist	–	The present building is modern, but the first chapel on the site was built and registered in 1912 for the Soldiers' Home and Mission, which had been active in Winchester and surrounding areas since the late 19th century. At first it was known as "Home Hall". The present independent Evangelical congregation, which is aligned with the Reformed Baptist movement, registered the premises in November 1950.	
St Peter's Church (More images)		Winchester; 51.064891°N 1.314921°W	Roman Catholic	II	The Catholics' mid-18th-century chapel, now Milner Hall and still used by the church, was replaced by the present "richly detailed" Decorated Gothic Revival church in 1926. It was designed by Frederick Walters; work began in 1924. It is of Bargate stone and Bath stone, and has a reset Norman doorway taken from a demolished leper hospital. The church cost £23,000 and opened on 15 July 1926.	
Salvation Army Hall (More images)		Winchester; 51.065098°N 1.313063°W	Salvation Army	–	The present building was registered in July 1995, replacing an earlier hall on the site which dated from 1889.	
Winchester Vineyard Centre (More images)		Winchester; 51.052814°N 1.306766°W	Vineyard Churches	–	This building was registered in 2001 for a congregation associated with the Association of Vineyard Churches, a neo-charismatic movement.	
Holy Trinity Church (More images)		Wonston; 51.153145°N 1.319365°W	Anglican	II*	There was a severe fire here in 1714, but some medieval fabric survives. Another fire in 1908 destroyed much of the work undertaken in the chancel during a restoration of 1871–72 by G.E. Laing. Thomas Graham Jackson restored the church again after this. A church on the site was recorded in 901, but the oldest remaining fabric is late-12th century. The south doorway is late Norman, dating from about 1200. The chancel arch is an "interesting piece of 13th-century work". The nave has an aisle on the north side only, added in 1829.	
St James's Church (More images)		Woodmancott; 51.179541°N 1.196961°W	Anglican	II	This is a simple church consisting of nave, chancel and bell-cot only, entirely of flint and in the Early English Gothic Revival style. It was designed by John Colson between 1854 and 1856 (Note: The listing particulars incorrectly gives the date as 1835.) and replaced a church which was destroyed by fire at Easter 1854.	

== Former places of worship ==
Current places of worship
Name	Image	Location	Denomination/ Affiliation	Grade	Notes	Refs
Alresford Congregational Chapel (More images)		Alresford; 51.090178°N 1.165348°W	Congregational	II	This building served as a Congregational chapel from 1825 until its closure in 1964, but it was built for secular purposes in the 18th century. After it closed it was immediately taken over by the local Methodist congregation, who used it until their new church was completed in 1979; then it became a museum. The building was enlarged in about 1840, and the three-bay pedimented façade dates from that time.	
Alresford Primitive Methodist Chapel (More images)		Alresford; 51.090149°N 1.164735°W	Methodist	–	This was the town's original Methodist chapel, opened in 1896 for Primitive Methodists and registered in 1922. It was built by Basingstoke-based H. Mundy. Its registration was cancelled in 1964 when the congregation sold the building for £3,000 and moved to the vacated Congregational chapel on West Street prior to building a new church on Pound Hill. After a period of dereliction, it was converted into a youth centre in 1995 and then became a community events venue in 2017.	
Baybridge Methodist Chapel (More images)		Baybridge; 51.006707°N 1.250003°W	Methodist	–	The brick-built former chapel, which is now a house, was registered for worship between February 1869 and March 1980. It was originally Primitive Methodist and had a seating capacity of 60.	
Cheriton United Reformed Church (More images)		Cheriton; 51.053825°N 1.168841°W	United Reformed Church	–	Although not registered until 1966, the United Reformed (formerly Congregational) chapel in Cheriton was built in 1862 in a simple Gothic Revival style. It has been converted into an office.	
St Barnabas' Church		Curbridge; 50.901337°N 1.251539°W	Anglican	–	The church was in the parish of St Paul's Church at nearby Sarisbury and served the villages of Curbridge and Burridge. It closed in 2006 after a reduction in the number of worshippers and was sold for residential conversion in 2009. It was built in 1892 to the design of Ewan Christian.	
Curdridge Primitive Methodist Chapel (More images)		Curdridge; 50.923479°N 1.245435°W	Methodist	–	An iron chapel existed at Curdridge in 1911 in addition to the Anglican parish church. The present building, which went out of religious use in 2004 and has been converted into a house, opened in 1925 for Primitive Methodists. It is of brick and could seat 80 worshippers.	
The Cornerstone (More images)		Denmead; 50.898422°N 1.060784°W	Baptist	–	Baptists met in the Denmead area from 1828, but when the fellowship declined they donated the original chapel to the Church of England. When a new Anglican church was built, the Baptists took over their original chapel again, rebuilt it in 1894 and registered in 1898. It closed in 2014 and was demolished, and the congregation acquired the former Mead End pub in the village in the same year. It was converted into a church and community centre, but this remained open for only five years before it too closed in mid-2019.	
Bethel Primitive Methodist Chapel (More images)		Droxford; 50.960429°N 1.139419°W	Methodist	–	The chapel was built for Primitive Methodists in 1886 and was one of three such chapels in the historic parish of Droxford: the others are at Shirrell Heath and Swanmore. In 1940 it was the head chapel of the Droxford Circuit, which had six other chapels outside the parish. The brick-built, 120-capacity chapel was registered between July 1888 and February 1980; it then passed into commercial use, originally as a garden centre.	
Durley Methodist Church (More images)		Durley; 50.953193°N 1.256845°W	Methodist	–	Wesleyan Methodists built this brick chapel in 1851. The capacity was 120 worshippers. It was registered for marriages in February 1903, but the registration was cancelled in September 1985 and the building has been converted into a house.	
Easton Methodist Church (More images)		Easton; 51.085780°N 1.269663°W	Methodist	–	This Primitive Methodist chapel, which closed in 1969 and has been converted for residential use, is the third in the village; the other two have been demolished. It was built in 1909, of brick and with a capacity of 100, to replace a building of 1870 which survived in alternative use after its closure until 1969. The 1870 chapel had in turn replaced one built in 1840, also with a capacity of 100. The 1909 chapel was formally registered for worship the following year; its registration was not officially cancelled until 1982.	
St Mary's Church (More images)		Itchen Stoke; 51.088417°N 1.203083°W	Anglican	II*	This church was the third to serve the River Itchen-side parish. Both predecessors, dating from c. 1270 and 1830 respectively, suffered from damp and other structural problems. Henry Conybeare designed the present building in 1866; (Note: The Victoria County History of Hampshire (1911) gives 1864 as the date of construction.) it has been described as "quite remarkable for its date, and one of the most uplifting Victorian churches in Hampshire". It cost £7,000 and is French Gothic in style. There is no internal division between the nave and the chancel, which terminates in a polygonal apse. The church was declared redundant in November 1973 and was put under the care of the Churches Conservation Trust in May 1975.	
Micheldever Primitive Methodist Chapel (More images)		Micheldever; 51.152390°N 1.272393°W	Methodist	–	Outdoor meetings of Primitive Methodists at Micheldever attracted thousands of followers as early as 1835, and a 120-capacity brick chapel was built at the Northbrook crossroads in the village in 1867. It became the head of a Circuit which in 1940 had 11 Methodist chapels, all of Primitive Methodist origin. The building was registered for marriages in March 1901, but it had fallen out of use by March 1981 when its registration was cancelled, and has been converted into a house.	
Micheldever Station Primitive Methodist Chapel (More images)		Micheldever Station; 51.178532°N 1.260514°W	Methodist	–	Micheldever Station village grew up around the railway station of that name, north of Micheldever village. The first Primitive Methodist chapel here, located "due west of the station", was a tin tabernacle erected in 1886 and registered for worship in February 1887. It was replaced by a new combined chapel and school in the early 20th century. It remained in religious use until the 1950s (although its registration was not formally cancelled until 1980) and has become a house.	
Ebenezer Methodist Church		North Boarhunt; 50.892578°N 1.143542°W	Methodist	–	The chapel was built in 1924 for Wesleyan Methodists and registered for worship the following year, replacing the nearby Wesleyan chapel which existed by 1908. It was also registered for marriages in July 1940. The building was put up for auction in June 2017.	
North Boarhunt Wesleyan Chapel		North Boarhunt; 50.893538°N 1.142771°W	Independent Methodist	–	The original Wesleyan chapel in the village was superseded by the new building nearby in 1924, and is now in residential use as Chapel House.	
Pitt Mission Church (More images)		Pitt; 51.050015°N 1.358001°W	Anglican	II	Pitt is now on the outskirts of Winchester, but for ecclesiastical purposes it was in the parish of Hursley, about 2 1/2 miles (4.0 km) south. A combined chapel of ease and school building was built at Pitt in 1858 to the design of William Butterfield. It was paid for by Charlotte Yonge, who lived locally. In its original form it was a five-bay brick building with no division between nave and chancel. The building has been converted into a house.	
Shawford Mission Hall (More images)		Shawford; 51.022142°N 1.327203°W	Evangelical	–	The mission hall was built in 1892 by the Winchester-based Soldiers' Home Mission and was registered in April 1897. It is now a house.	
Old St John's Church (More images)		Shedfield; 50.916818°N 1.203156°W	Anglican	II	The new church at Shedfield was built in another part of the churchyard in 1875. The old church of 1829, of which only the tower remains, was demolished at that time. It is of brick with Gothic-style pointed arches, buttresses and a battlemented upper stage. The double entrance doors survive in the west end.	
Soberton Heath Methodist Church		Soberton; 50.928419°N 1.137872°W	Methodist	–	The chapel was built in 1868, registered for marriages in 1884, reconstructed in 1902 and remained in use until 2009, after which it was converted into a house. It was originally opened for the Free Methodists, who later became part of the United Methodist Church. The chapel was of brick and had a capacity of 150.	
St Peter's Church (More images)		Sparsholt; 51.081981°N 1.369760°W	Anglican	II	The ruined chapel stands in the grounds of Lainston House, and "probably owed its origin to the jealousy between" two landowning families which had persisted since the 13th century and which had caused the land making up Sparsholt parish to be split across two manors—Sparsholt and Lainston. The church was in ruins by the 18th century and the roof was taken off in 1854, although it was only formally declared redundant in 1980; three of the walls remain, including the whole of the west wall, and there are 18th-century grave slabs on the floor. Some of the fabric is early-12th century.	
Sparsholt Methodist Chapel (More images)		Sparsholt; 51.077459°N 1.380261°W	Methodist	–	Like the chapel at Soberton Heath, this was built for members of the United Methodist Free Churches and later became a United Methodist chapel. It was registered for worship in February 1893 and for marriages in September 1987, but these certifications were cancelled in 1980 and the brick-built chapel is now a house. It had a capacity of 80.	
Ebenezer Methodist Chapel (More images)		Sutton Scotney; 51.153170°N 1.340046°W	Methodist	–	Originally one of the many Primitive Methodist chapels in the Micheldever Circuit, this was built in 1888 and is mixed architecturally, with both Gothic-arched and round-arched windows and walls of red and gault brick. Its capacity was 200. It was registered for worship and for marriages in 1896, but has closed and has been converted into a nursery school.	
Warnford Primitive Methodist Chapel (More images)		Warnford; 51.004219°N 1.112226°W	Methodist	–	This was built for Primitive Methodists. Its religious use was short-lived: it was registered only between May 1909 and June 1925, and is now in residential use.	
West Meon Methodist Chapel (More images)		West Meon; 51.012128°N 1.086977°W	Methodist	–	This chapel had a capacity of 150 and was built of brick for Primitive Methodists, but its dates are uncertain. Various sources give its opening date as 1872, 1922 or 1929; it was formally registered between 1930 and 1978, but its closing date has also been reported as 1970 and 1990.	
Mission Church (More images)		West Meon Woodlands; 51.039582°N 1.080029°W	Anglican	–	This building, which is now a house, is marked as a mission church on the 1897 and 1962 Ordnance Survey maps.	
Wickham Methodist Church (More images)		Wickham; 50.898215°N 1.187956°W	Methodist	–	This brick chapel was built for Wesleyan Methodists and in 1940 was one of nine Methodist churches in the Gosport and Fareham Circuit, all of which had Wesleyan origins. It had a capacity of 120 and was registered as a place of worship between 1906 and 2006.	
St Maurice's Church (More images)		Winchester; 51.061917°N 1.312635°W	Anglican	II	Only the tower survives of this largely 12th-century church: the rest of the building was demolished in 1958. Also prominent in the façade is a Norman doorway, which was reinserted when the tower was rebuilt in the 15th century. The building was restored in 1841–42 and mostly rebuilt in brick; it had a chancel and a nave with aisles on both sides. "One of the most interesting things in the church" was a Saxon-era sundial which resembled those in the nearby churches of Corhampton and Warnford.	
St Michael's Church (More images)		Winchester; 51.057667°N 1.316121°W	Anglican	II*	William Butterfield restored and rebuilt this church between 1879 and 1882, adding the organ chamber, porch and vestry (later extended) and inserting new windows, but a great deal of medieval fabric remains and there are Saxon origins, including a surviving sundial of that era. The tower, which is quite low, dates from the 13th century and was buttressed in the following century. The walls are of flint and stone. It was declared redundant by the Diocese of Winchester in August 1972, and Winchester College took it over as their chapel. Historically the church was also known as the Church of St Michael-without-Kingsgate and St Michael-in-the-Soke.	
St Peter Chesil Church (More images)		Winchester; 51.060128°N 1.306955°W	Anglican	II*	This church was first described in 1148, and the undivided chancel and nave may be of that era. A south aisle and short tower were added in the 13th century; a north aisle may also have been built, but if it ever existed it had been removed by the early 17th century. The church fell out of use in 1949 and was converted into a theatre in 1963, preserving most of the features of the interior.	
St Thomas's and St Clement's Church (More images)		Winchester; 51.061231°N 1.318540°W	Anglican	II	This Victorian church "has great visual impact" as a result of its size and the tall (180-foot (55 m), "commanding" spire, which was built 11 years after the main period of construction in 1845–46 at a cost of £8,152. The spire added another £1,800. The architect, E.W. Elmslie, used the Decorated Gothic Revival style. There is a two-bay chancel flanked by north and south chapels, a five-bay nave with aisles, and a transept on the north side. It was declared redundant by the Diocese of Winchester in April 1970 and has been converted into offices.	
Methodist Chapel (More images)		Winchester; 51.064359°N 1.314424°W	Methodist	–	The chapel, which was converted for office use in 1978 and then into flats in 2007, was built for Wesleyan Methodists in 1864 of flint and stone in the Gothic Revival style to the design of William Willmer Pocock and was registered for their use in March 1867. It remained in use alongside the other (former Primitive Methodist) chapel in Parchment Street until both were deregistered in September 1977. The façade has paired lancet windows and gabled porches, and there is a rose window above. The side elevation also has paired lancets.	
United Methodist Free Church (More images)		Winchester; 51.064160°N 1.313236°W	Methodist	–	This flint-built chapel was in use between 1874 and 1937 and was built for United Free Methodists, who became part of the United Methodist Church in 1907. It was surplus to requirements after the Methodist Union of 1932, and its registration for marriages (granted in March 1886) was cancelled in June 1938. It was in use as a Royal British Legion hall in the late 20th century but was later converted for residential use.	
Winchester Primitive Methodist Chapel (More images)		Winchester; 51.063667°N 1.314014°W	Methodist	–	In 1853 a Primitive Methodist congregation took over a chapel on this street which had been built for Independents, who later became Congregationalists. The Methodists used it until 1903, when they built a new chapel on a nearby site. The foundation stone for this was laid on 28 May of that year. The chapel has a "thin" Gothic Revival brick façade with pointed windows, but other elements of the building are more Classical in style. It remained in use as a Methodist chapel until 1973, when the congregation united with that at the former Wesleyan chapel nearby (which also closed later in that decade). The former chapel is now in part residential and part commercial use.	
Brethren Meeting Room		Winchester; 51.070560°N 1.320174°W	Plymouth Brethren	–	This building, which is now a house, was registered for use for worship by a Brethren congregation between 1964 and 1971.	

== Bibliography ==
- Balfour, Alan (1970). Portsmouth. City Buildings Series. London: Studio Vista. ISBN 0-289-79806-X.
- Bullen, Michael; Crook, John; Hubbuck, Rodney; Pevsner, Nikolaus (2010). Hampshire: Winchester and the North. The Buildings of England. London: Yale University Press. ISBN 978-0-300-12084-4.
- Diocese of Portsmouth (December 1959). Portsmouth Diocesan Yearbook 1960 (12th ed.). Winchester: Donald S. Martell Ltd.
- Facey, Roy A., ed. (1981). International Church Index (Doctrinal). Index Publications. ISBN 0-907578-00-4.
- Farmer, David (2000). A Brief History of Oliver's Battery (PDF). Oliver's Battery Parish Council. Archived (PDF) from the original on 6 October 2018.
- Grass, Tim (2021). Brethren and their Buildings. Glasgow: Brethren Archivists and Historians Network. ISBN 978-1-916013-06-3.
- Hall, Reg (2008). Things are Different Now! (PDF). Winchester Family Church. Archived (PDF) from the original on 19 June 2018.
- Hill, Roy (2002) [1990]. The Assemblies Address Book (PDF) (5th ed.). Bristol: Christian Year Publications. ISBN 1-872734-25-1. Archived from the original (PDF) on 2004-09-19.
- Kelly, Bernard W. (1907). Historical Notes on English Catholic Missions (PDF). London: Kegan Paul, Trench, Trübner & Co.
- Lloyd, David W. (1974). Buildings of Portsmouth and its Environs: A survey of the dockyard, defences, homes, churches, commercial, civic and public buildings. Portsmouth: City of Portsmouth. ISBN 0-901559-53-9.
- McAuley, Fr James (16 July 2016). The Diocese of Portsmouth Parish Boundaries 2016 (PDF) (Report). Portsmouth: Roman Catholic Diocese of Portsmouth. Archived from the original (PDF) on 5 August 2019.
- Methodist Church of Great Britain (1947). Methodist Church Buildings: Statistical Returns including Seating Accommodation as at July 1st, 1940 (PDF). Manchester: The Department for Chapel Affairs. (Available online in 14 parts; Guide to abbreviations on page 6)
- O'Brien, Charles; Bailey, Bruce; Pevsner, Nikolaus; Lloyd, David W. (2018). Hampshire: South. The Buildings of England. London: Yale University Press. ISBN 978-0-300-22503-7.
- s.n. (June 1933). A List of Some Assemblies of the British Isles. London: Pickering & Inglis.
- Skidmore, Chris (2021). Quakers and their Meeting Houses. Swindon: Liverpool University Press. ISBN 978-1-80085-720-9.
- Stell, Christopher (1991). Inventory of Nonconformist Chapels and Meeting-Houses in South-West England. London: Royal Commission on the Historical Monuments of England. ISBN 0-117011-81-9.
