= Winchester United Church =

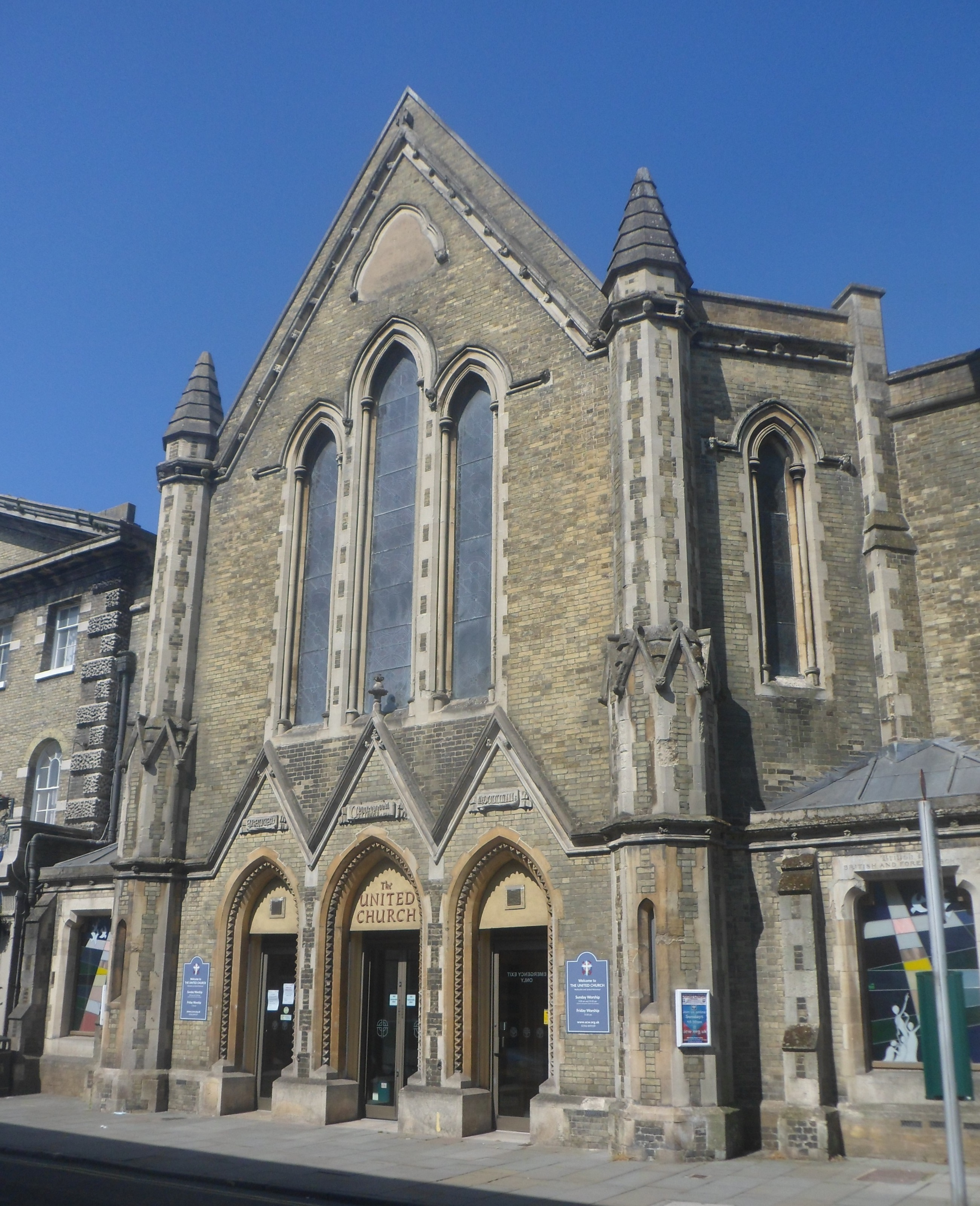
- The church in 2021, seen from the northeast
- Winchester United Church
- 51.0640°N 1.3165°W
- OS grid reference: SU 48001 29628
- Location: Jewry Street, Winchester, Hampshire SO23 8RZ
- Country: England
- Denomination: United Reformed and Methodist
- Website: ucw.org.uk/

History
- Former name(s): Winchester Congregational Church (to 1972); Winchester United Reformed Church (1972–1974)
- Status: Church
- Founded: Late 17th century
- Events: 1704: original chapel built on Parchment Street; 1807: chapel rebuilt 11 October 1853: present chapel opened 1972: joined United Reformed Church; 8 September 1974: reconstituted as joint United Reformed and Methodist church 1989–91: interior altered and subdivided

Architecture
- Functional status: Active
- Heritage designation: Grade II
- Designated: 24 March 1950
- Architect(s): William Ford Poulton and William Henry Woodman
- Style: Early English Gothic Revival
- Years built: 1852–1853
- Groundbreaking: 1852

Winchester United Church (originally Winchester Congregational Church and later Winchester United Reformed Church) is a joint United Reformed and Methodist church in the centre of the city of Winchester in the English county of Hampshire. Built between 1852 and 1853 to the Gothic Revival design of architects Poulton and Woodman for a congregation which had its origins nearly 200 years earlier, it is "incongruously set within the northern part of the former county jail", which had recently moved to a new site. Since 1974 the congregation has been a joint United Reformed and Methodist one, as the city's two Methodist chapels closed, the congregations merged and worship was concentrated on the one site. Historic England has designated the church a Grade II listed building for its architectural and historical importance.

== History ==
A congregation of Presbyterians formed in Winchester in the late 16th century and opened a chapel on Parchment Street in 1704. This was rebuilt in 1807. Over time the theological outlook of the church changed: it became an Independent church and then became associated with Congregationalism. In 1852 a site on Jewry Street was chosen for a new chapel building. It formed part of the site of the old jail, which had been replaced by a new building (now HM Prison Winchester) on Romsey Road in 1850. Much of the structure of the old jail, a "forbidding" building rebuilt c. 1805, survived, and the new church was built between the remaining sections—the five-bay main entrance (now a pub called The Old Gaolhouse) and the north wing (now a shop)—"oddly separat[ing]" them. The new church opened on 11 October 1853, and the old chapel on Parchment Street was taken over by the Primitive Methodist Church. They rebuilt it in 1903.

The United Reformed Church denomination was formed from the amalgamation of the Congregational Church and the Presbyterian Church of England in 1972, and the church joined the new denomination at this time, becoming one of 34 United Reformed churches in the Southampton district of Wessex Province. (Note: The Provinces were regional groupings of churches. Their management of was undertaken by a Provincial Synod, and the term Synod is now used in relation to the regions: thus Winchester United Church is now part of Wessex Synod.) Around the same time, the church began working closely with the local Methodist community, who had two chapels nearby: the chapel of 1903 which had been used by Primitive Methodists prior to the Methodist Union of 1932, and another on St Peter's Street which was built in 1864 for the Wesleyan Methodist community. Discussions between the United Reformed and Methodist ministers culminated in the decision to unite the congregations on one site. The United Reformed Church building on Jewry Street was chosen, as it was the largest, and the present Winchester United Church was formally constituted on 8 September 1974. Both Methodist chapels had their registrations formally cancelled in September 1977 and have been converted for secular use: the Wesleyan chapel became a suite of offices in 1978 before being reconverted into flats in 2007, and the Primitive Methodist chapel—which had already closed in 1973—became a mixed-use development with flats and offices. The agreement to unite the congregations included a commitment to redevelop the interior of the building. Proposals were in place in 1986, but the work did not take place until 1989–91. The work was "inventively and sympathetically" undertaken by the architecture firm Plincke, Leaman and Browning.

Under the name Congregational Chapel, Winchester United Church was listed at Grade II by English Heritage, the predecessor of Historic England, on 24 March 1950. This defines it as a "nationally important" building of "special interest". As of February 2001 it was one of 2,037 Grade II listed buildings, and 2,219 listed buildings of all grades, in the City of Winchester District.

== Architecture ==
The church was designed by the Reading-based architectural firm Poulton and Woodman (William Ford Poulton and William Henry Woodman) between 1852 and 1853. Their 10-year partnership only started in 1853, and the Pevsner Architectural Guides give only Poulton as the architect. The building's listing particulars give its completion date as 1855. Other local works by the firm included the now demolished cemetery chapels at Basingstoke.

The design Poulton and Woodman adopted at Winchester United Church was very similar to their earlier Congregational chapel at St Helier, Jersey and has been described as "striking in its originality". It is Early English Gothic Revival in style, built of yellow stock brick and with pale stone quoins and dressings. The entrance consists of three pointed archways with triangular gables above them. Above are three tall, "prominent" lancet windows, then a trefoil window and a tall pointed gable. To the sides are single bays set at an angle and with single lancet windows. Secondary entrances are set below these. The façade was originally flanked by tall pinnacles, but these have been removed. The roof is laid with slates.

The interior is shaped like a stretched octagon. There is an arcade of "lanky" pointed arches around all sides of the church, reaching to just below the timber hammerbeam roof. As originally designed, there were low galleries on each side giving access to subsidiary rooms at the rear, and wooden pews with low doors at the ends; these have been replaced by moveable seating. The work undertaken in 1989–91 subdivided the interior horizontally at the level of the gallery. The lancet windows at the front and an octagonal rooflight provide the only natural light to the interior. There is a Victorian clock in a Gothic-style surround and an organ case of the same era. There is also a single grisaille Early English-style stained glass window. The Pevsner Architectural Guides series attributes this to "J. Bell of Bristol". Joseph Bell & Son was a Bristol-based stained glass firm which operated from 1840 until 1996; it was not related to the prolific London firm of Clayton and Bell which operated in the same era.

== Administration ==
Winchester United Church is part of both the Wessex Synod of the United Reformed Church and the Winchester, Eastleigh & Romsey Methodist Circuit.

The church is registered for worship in accordance with the Places of Worship Registration Act 1855; its number on the register is 1288. Under the name Congregational Church it was registered for the solemnisation of marriages in accordance with the Marriage Act 1836 on 9 December 1853.

One service is held at the church every Sunday morning. Other facilities include a community café, food bank and social groups for elderly people.

== See also ==
- Media related to Winchester United Church at Wikimedia Commons
- List of places of worship in the City of Winchester District

== Bibliography ==
- Bullen, Michael; Crook, John; Hubbuck, Rodney; Pevsner, Nikolaus (2010). Hampshire: Winchester and the North. The Buildings of England. London: Yale University Press. ISBN 978-0-300-12084-4.
- Facey, Roy A., ed. (1981). International Church Index (Doctrinal). Index Publications. ISBN 0-907578-00-4.
- Stell, Christopher (1991). Inventory of Nonconformist Chapels and Meeting-Houses in South-West England. London: Royal Commission on the Historical Monuments of England. ISBN 0-11-300036-7.
- United Reformed Church (1972). The United Reformed Church First General Assembly: Agenda and Reports (PDF). London: United Reformed Church. Archived (PDF) from the original on 22 March 2023.
