= St Swithun-upon-Kingsgate Church =

St Swithun upon Kingsgate
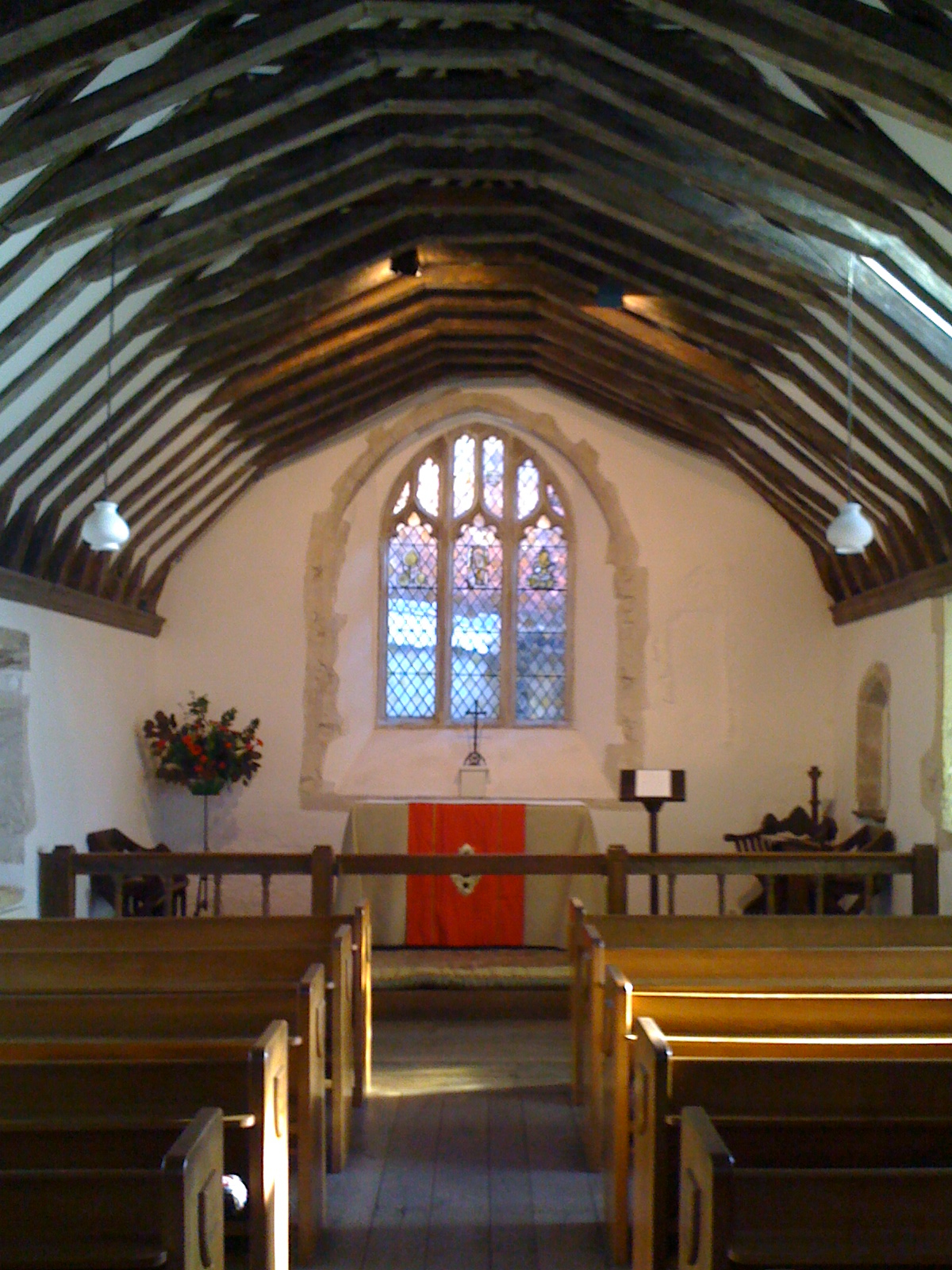
- St Swithun upon Kingsgate

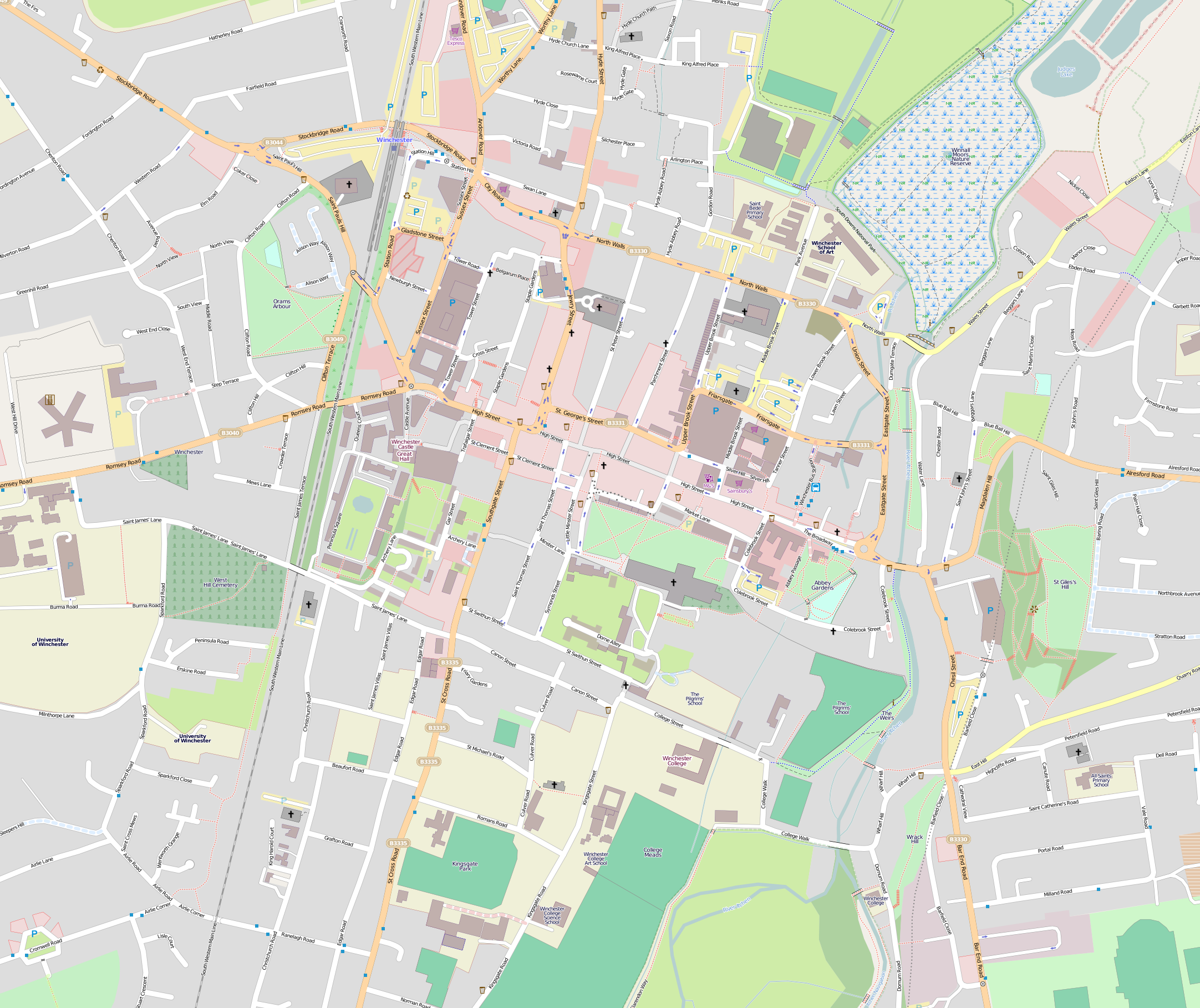
- Location within Central Winchester
- 51°3′33″N 1°18′52″W
- OS grid reference: SU 48144 29092
- Location: Kingsgate, Winchester
- Country: England
- Denomination: Church of England

Architecture
- Style: Early English
- Years built: Thirteenth Century

Administration
- Parish: St Lawrence with St Swithun

Clergy
- Rector: Rev'd Karen Kousseff

St Swithun upon Kingsgate is a Church of England church in Winchester, Hampshire, England, built in the Middle Ages in the Early English style. Located above the medieval Kingsgate, one of the principal entrances to the city, the church is unusual in forming a part of the fabric of the old city walls. St Swithun's first appears in 13th century records, and under the fictional name of St Cuthbert's, is mentioned in Anthony Trollope's novel The Warden.

== History ==
=== Medieval origins ===
No record survives of the building of the church. In the 1148 survey of the Winton Domesday, entry 928 says "in the gate of King's Gate the sacristan receives 15d" (in porta de Chingeta habet sacrista xv d), but the first extant mention of the church itself is in the Annales de Wintonia which record that in 1264 there was a citizens' revolt during which buildings were burned including "Kingsgate with the church of St Swithun above" (Kingate cum ecclesia Sancti Swythuni supra). Most likely the church served as a chapel for lay people who worked for the Abbey. In 1337 some woodwork was done on the church, costing a total of fifteen shillings, and in 1484 the windows underwent repair.

St Swithun was an Anglo-Saxon saint, born in Winchester and in 852 becoming the 19th bishop of the city. He died in 862 when King Alfred the Great was still a young man. It is possible that St Swithun was tutor to the young king, and accompanied him on a pilgrimage to Rome.

According to legend, St Swithun has a special association with the English weather, a legend which dates from July 971 when the bones of the saint were moved from outside the old Saxon cathedral and brought inside the building, apparently causing a great thunderstorm:

"On St Swithun's Day, if then dost rain,
For forty days it will remain:
St Swithun's Day, if then be fair,
For forty days 'twill rain nae mair."

St Swithun's Day is celebrated on 15 July.

=== Reformation ===
In 1538 the Shrine of St Swithun in Winchester Cathedral was destroyed, and in 1539 the monastery was dissolved. St Swithun upon Kingsgate became a parish church. The East wall niche, which today lies empty, most likely once held a statue of St Swithun, which was probably destroyed at this time.

By the 17th century the church had fallen into disrepair, and had become home to one Robert Allen, the porter of Kings Gate, and his wife, "who did and doth keep swine at ye ende of the Chapell". The situation was improved around 1660 when the church was restored, its bells re-hung in 1677. It has remained a place of worship since that time.

=== 19th century and literary fame ===
St Swithun's appears in Anthony Trollope's novel The Warden, in which Warden Harding is appointed Rector of St Cuthbert's (a thinly disguised St Swithun's), after he has resigned from Hiram's hospital (most likely based upon the Hospital of St Cross). Writing in the 1850s, Trollope describes the church, in Chapter 21, as follows:

"The church is a singular little Gothic building, perched over a gateway, through which the Close is entered, and is approached by a flight of stone steps which leads down under the archway of the gate. It is no bigger than an ordinary room – perhaps twenty seven feet long by eighteen wide – but still a perfect church".

St Swithun's differs somewhat from this description; the stairway is of wood, and the church is positioned over the Kings Gate, not over the nearby gateway to the Close (usually known as the Prior's Gate).

== Modern era ==
Today, Kings Gate, which is a scheduled monument, is maintained by the City of Winchester, while the duty of maintaining the grade I listed church falls upon the parish of St Lawrence with St Swithun-upon-Kingsgate. A 17th altar rail taken from a Winchester school was installed in the church in 1960. The east window has some fragments of medieval stained glass, most likely depicting the Annunciation, which were brought in 1961 from St Peter's Church, Chesil. In 1968 a parishioner named Colin Campbell built new pews for the church which now make up the majority. Entry to the church is via a staircase, partially dating from the 1500s with steps from 1954, accessible from St Swithun Street next to the right-hand arch of the three arches of the Kings Gate.

In retirement, the late Lord Coggan, formerly the Archbishop of Canterbury, regularly attended the Church where he sometimes accompanied services, playing the piano, surely the only Archbishop ever to have done so. His funeral took place at St Swithun's on 26 May 2000, and he is commemorated there by his initials carved on a bench-end.

== Gallery ==
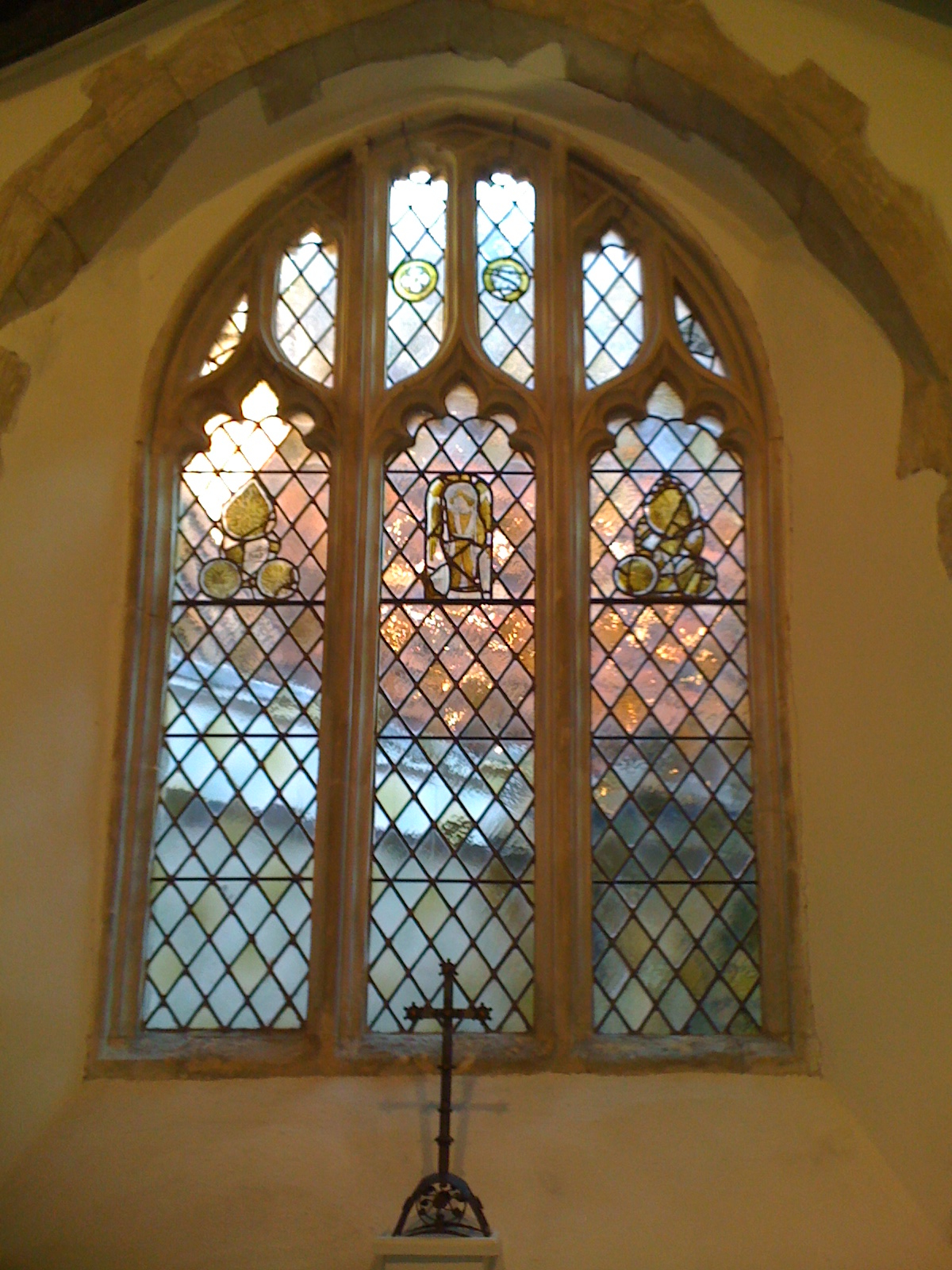
East window

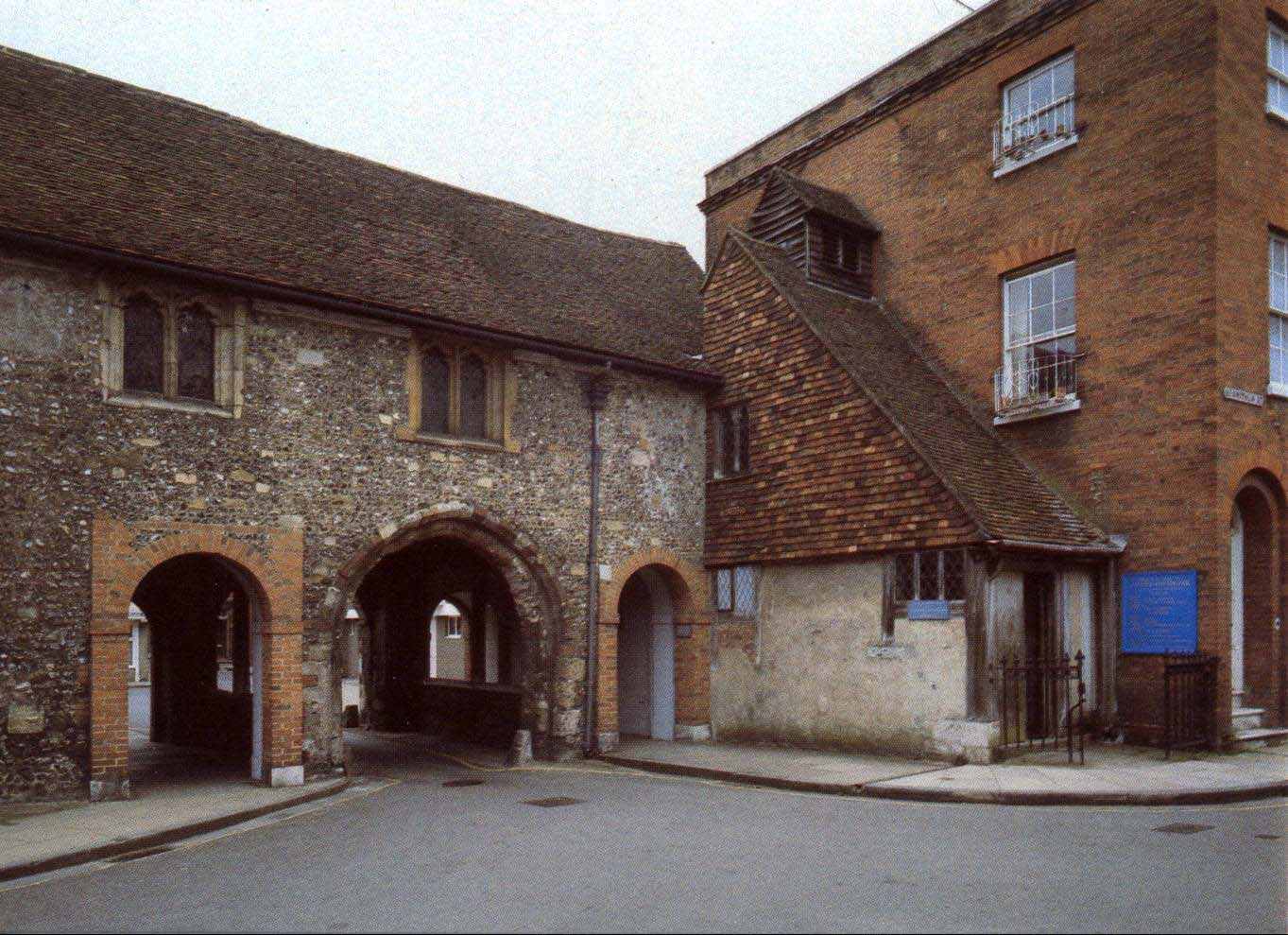
Exterior view of St Swithun-upon-Kingsgate Church (entrance by staircase on right)

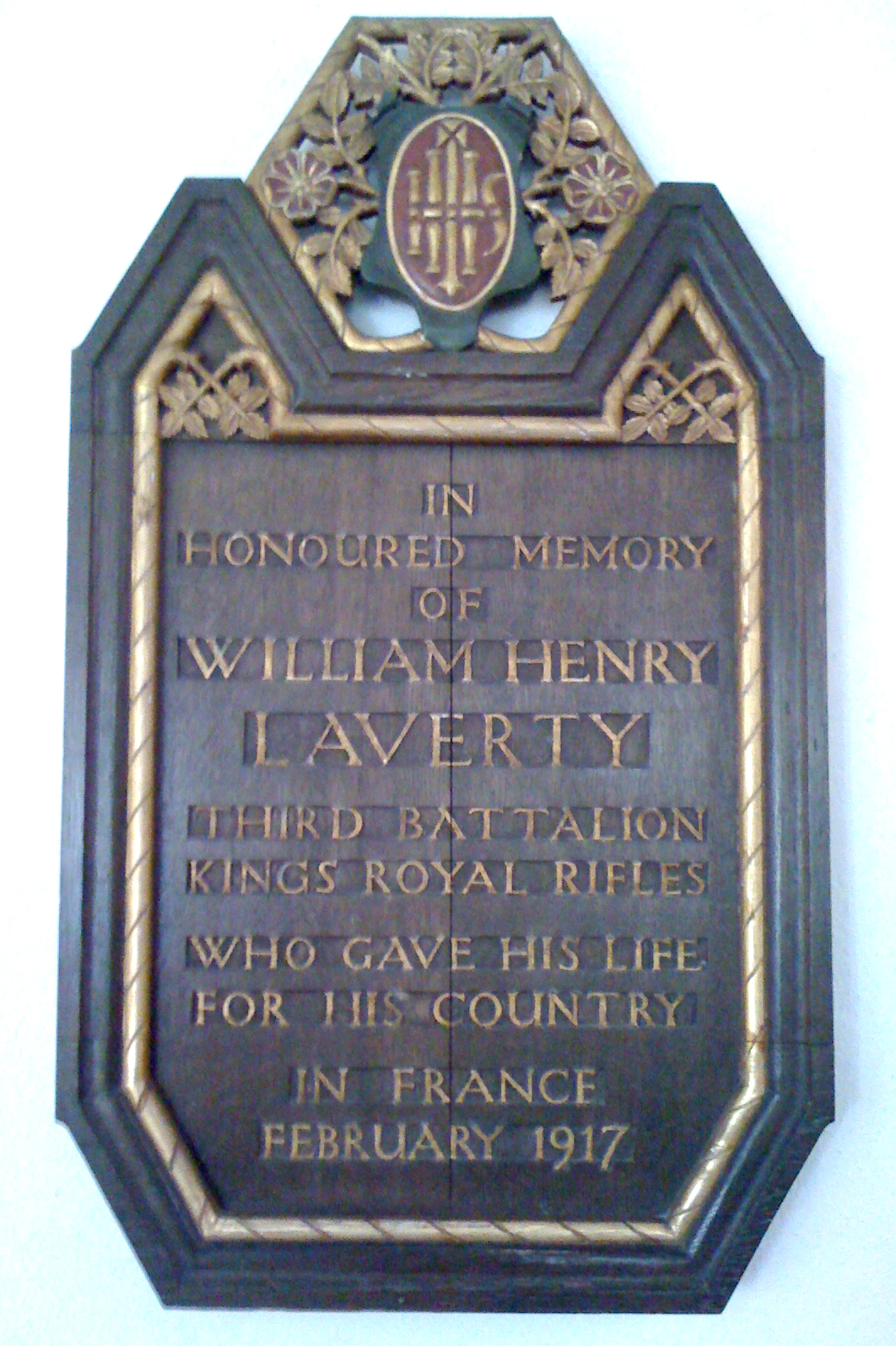
Memorial to St Swithun's parishioner William Henry Laverty, killed in World War I.
