= Durley =

Village and parish in Hampshire, England

Coordinates: 50.9475°N 1.2585°W

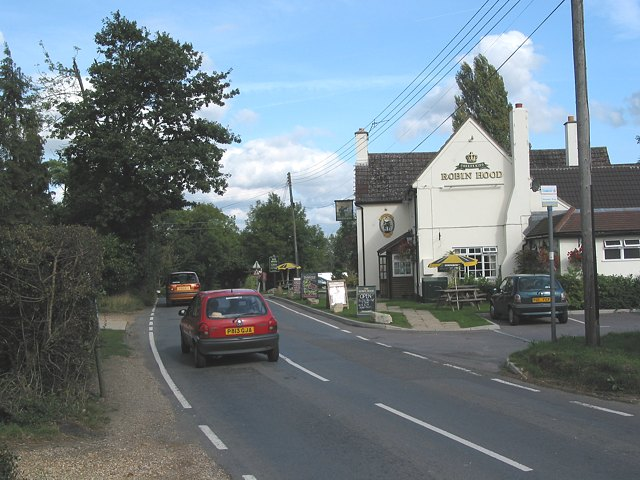
- The Robin Hood Inn on Durley Street in the village

- Location within Hampshire
- Population: 992
- OS grid reference: SU5218916710
- Civil parish: Durley
- District: City of Winchester
- Shire county: Hampshire
- Region: South East
- Country: England
- Sovereign state: United Kingdom
- Post town: SOUTHAMPTON
- Postcode district: SO32
- Dialling code: 01489
- Police: Hampshire and Isle of Wight
- Fire: Hampshire and Isle of Wight
- Ambulance: South Central
- UK Parliament: Winchester

Durley is a village and civil parish in the City of Winchester district of Hampshire, England. It is located approximately 7½ miles (12.1 km) northeast of Southampton and has a population of around 992. The village has two pubs, the Robin Hood Inn and the Farmers Home. Durley has one school, Durley CE Primary, with approximately 130 pupils ranging from four to eleven years of age, and a pre-school called Durley Ladybirds. The village's church is the Church of the Holy Cross.

== Governance ==
The village is part of the civil parish of Durley and is part of the Bishop's Waltham ward of the City of Winchester non-metropolitan district of Hampshire County Council.

== Church ==
The village church is Holy Cross. It has some external features that date from the 13th century while its font appears to be 12th century. The church underwent a significant restoration in 1879.
