= Stanmore, Winchester =

Suburb of Winchester, Hampshire, England

Coordinates: 51.053214°N 1.335812°W

Stanmore
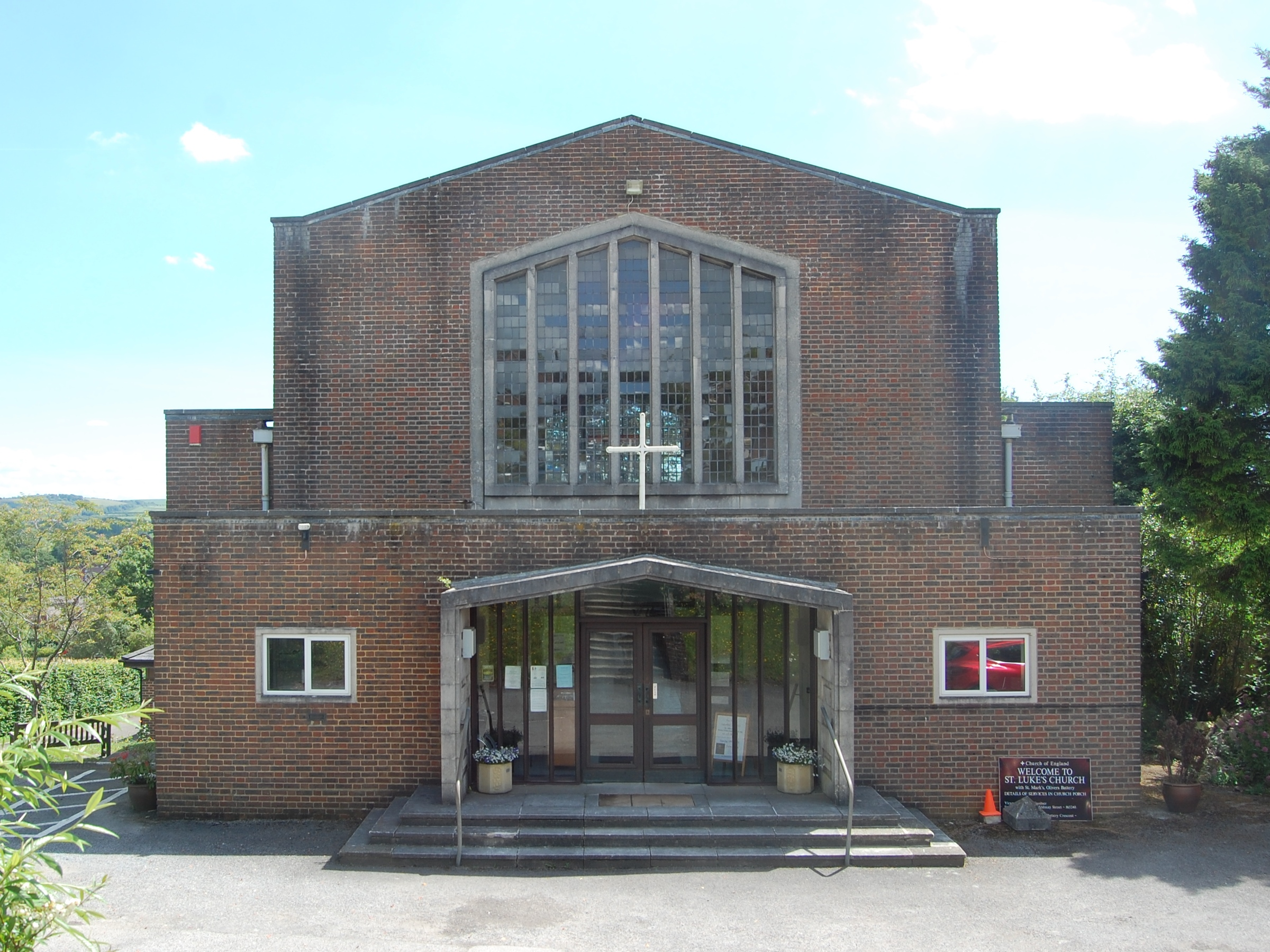
- St Luke's Church in 2019

- Location within Hampshire
- OS grid reference: SU466284
- District: Winchester
- Shire county: Hampshire
- Region: South East
- Country: England
- Sovereign state: United Kingdom
- Post town: Winchester
- Postcode district: SO22
- Dialling code: 01962
- Police: Hampshire and Isle of Wight
- Fire: Hampshire and Isle of Wight
- Ambulance: South Central
- UK Parliament: Winchester

Stanmore is a large residential suburb of Winchester, Hampshire, England, situated on a very steep slope from West to East. It lies to the south-west of the city centre and to the north of Badger Farm, and makes up a large percentage, in both area and population, of the St. Luke electoral ward. It is home to roughly 6,000 inhabitants.

== History ==
Historically the area was known as Stanmer Weye, before construction of the estate started in 1920. An official opening by Edward VIII, then the Prince of Wales, was carried out in 1923.

== Description ==
Stanmore is a typical early 1900s housing estate, with medium-sized red brick houses and numerous green spaces, however there are also a number of newer developments, especially around the area informally known as Lower Stanmore.

The Right to Buy scheme has enabled a large number of properties in Stanmore to come into private ownership, and this has seen the student population increase significantly. This is also due to Stanmore's close proximity to the University of Winchester.

== Amenities ==
The suburb formerly had two pubs, 'The Stanmore Hotel' (closed 2009) and 'New Queens Head' (closed 2012), with the former becoming a care home, and the latter being redeveloped into social housing. There are two local retail areas in Stanmore, in Wavell Way and Cromwell Road respectively. There is also a community centre on Somers Close. On the same site the Carroll Centre operates a nursery, after school club, mother and tots group and a soft play area with a cafe. 'Party in the Park', a community event with stalls and entertainment, is held annually in the summer.

== Religion ==
Stanmore is home to three religious institutions, St Luke's Church of the Church of England on Mildmay Street, and New Life Church (formerly known as Level10 Church) on Stanmore Lane. The third is St Stephens Catholic Church, situated on the same site as the local Catholic primary school, St Peters, on Oliver's Battery Road North.
