= St Peter's Church, Chesil, Winchester =

St Peter’s Church, Chesil, Winchester
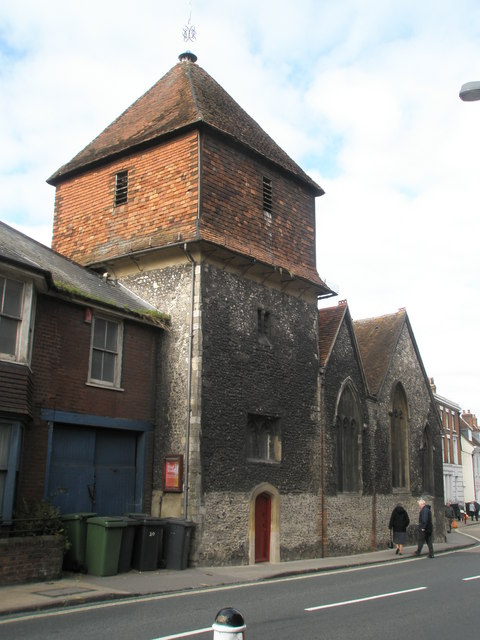
- St Peter’s Church, Chesil, Winchester
- St Peter’s Church, Chesil, Winchester
- 51°3′36.7″N 1°18′25″W
- OS grid reference: SU 48665 29205
- Location: Winchester
- Country: England
- Denomination: Church of England

History
- Dedication: Saint Peter

Architecture
- Heritage designation: Grade II* listed

Administration
- Province: Province of Canterbury
- Diocese: Diocese of Winchester

St Peter's Church, Chesil, Winchester, formerly known as St Peter upon Chesille without Eastgate, is a former parish church of the Church of England in Winchester, Hampshire, and is now the home of Chesil Theatre.

The church comprises elements from the 12th century and later. It is constructed of flint and stone, and the belfry turret, and roofs are hung with tiles.

It fell out of use after the Second World War and was declared structurally unsafe in 1960. It was then acquired by the Chesil Theatre company. In 1961 a stained glass window was moved from the church to St Swithun-upon-Kingsgate Church.

== Organ ==
The church contained a small one-manual pipe organ. A specification of the organ can be found on the National Pipe Organ Register.
