= Baybridge, Hampshire =

Village in Hampshire, England

Coordinates: 51°0′N 1°15′W

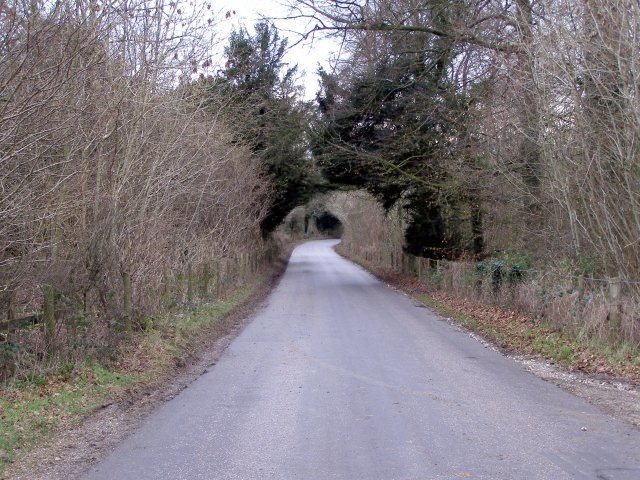
Longwood Road, Lane End Down

Baybridge is a small village in Hampshire, in England. It is situated to the east of Owslebury, south of Winchester.
