= Weeke =

Village and parish in Hampshire, England

Coordinates: 51°4.2996′N 1°20.021′W

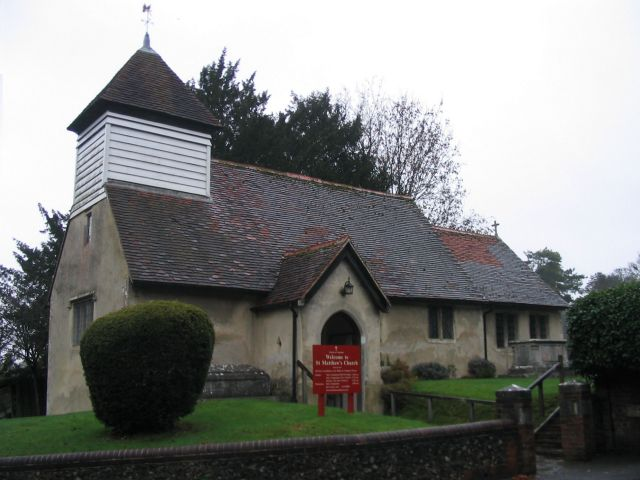
- St Matthew's Church

- Location within Hampshire
- District: Winchester
- Shire county: Hampshire
- Region: South East
- Country: England
- Sovereign state: United Kingdom

Weeke is an area based around St Matthew's Church, and an ecclesiastical parish to the north-west of Winchester, Hampshire, England.

== History ==
In 1891 the civil parish had a population of 2549. In 1894 the parish was abolished and split with the part in Winchester borough becoming Weeke Within and the rural part becoming Weeke Without. It is now in the unparished area of Winchester, in the Winchester district.
