= List of places in Hampshire =

Some of the larger settlements of Hampshire

This is a list of settlements in the county of Hampshire, England. Places highlighted in bold type are towns or cities.

The Isle of Wight was in Hampshire until 1890. (Note: The Isle of Wight containing many parishes was in Hampshire until 1890; see Politics of the Isle of Wight and List of places on the Isle of Wight.) Bournemouth and adjacent parishes in the far west (Note: Bournemouth Christchurch Hurn Highcliffe These four main settlements with broad parish boundaries surrounding their focal village were in the historic county of Hampshire since before the Norman Conquest. In 1974 new ceremonial and administrative boundaries were created under which these became part of Dorset.) were transferred to the ceremonial and administrative county of Dorset in 1974.

== A ==
- Abbots Worthy
- Abbotstone
- Abbotswood
- Abbotts Ann
- Abbotts Ann Down
- Abbotts Barton
- Abshot
- Adbury
- Adhurst St Mary
- Alderholt
- Aldermaston Soke
- Aldern Bridge
- **Aldershot**
- Allbrook
- Allum Green
- Alresford
- **Alton**
- Alverstoke
- Ampfield
- Amport
- **Andover**
- Andover Down
- Andwell
- Anna Valley
- Anthill Common
- Appleshaw
- Arford
- Ashe
- Ashe Warren
- Ashford Hill
- Ashford Hill with Headley (parish)
- Ashfield
- Ashlett
- Ashley (East Hampshire)
- Ashley (New Forest)
- Ashley (Test Valley)
- Ashley Range
- Ashley Warren
- Ashmansworth
- Ashton
- Ashurst
- Avington
- Awbridge
- Axford
- Axmansford

== B ==
- Badger Farm
- Baffins
- Bagmore
- Bagnum
- Bank
- Bar End
- Barford
- Bartley
- Barton on Sea
- Barton Stacey
- **Basingstoke**
- Bassett
- Bassett Green
- Battramsley
- Baughurst
- Baybridge
- Beaulieu
- Beauworth
- Beckley
- Bedhampton
- Beech
- Beggarwood
- Bentley
- Bentworth
- Betty Mundy's Bottom
- Bevois
- Bevois Valley
- Bickton
- Bidden
- Bighton
- Binley
- Binsted
- Bishop's Green
- Bishops Sutton
- Bishopstoke
- **Bishop's Waltham**
- Bisterne
- Bitterne
- Bitterne Park
- Bitterne Manor
- Blackfield
- Blackmoor
- Blacknest
- **Blackwater**
- Blackwater and Hawley
- Blashford
- Blendworth
- Blissford
- Blounce
- Boarhunt
- Bolderwood
- Boldre
- Bordean
- **Bordon**
- Bossington
- Botley
- Bowyer's Common
- Boyatt Wood
- Bradley
- Braishfield
- Brambridge
- Bramdean
- Bramdean Common
- Bramdean and Hinton Ampner
- Bramley
- Bramley Corner
- Bramley Green-
- Bramshaw
- Bramshill
- Bramshott
- Bramshott Common
- Bransbury
- Breamore
- Bridgemary
- Broadmere
- Brockbridge
- Brockenhurst
- Brock's Green
- Brook
- Brook, New Forest
- Brookheath
- Broughton
- Brown Candover
- Broxhill
- Buckholt
- Buckland (New Forest)
- Buckland (Portsmouth)
- Buckler's Hard
- Bull Hill
- Bullington
- Burgate
- Burghclere
- Buriton
- Burkham
- Burley
- Burridge
- Burrow Island
- Bursledon
- Butlocks Heath
- Butser Hill

== C ==
- Cadnam
- Calmore
- Calshot
- Canada
- Catherington
- Catisfield
- Chalton
- Chandler's Ford
- Chandlers Green
- Charlwood
- Charter Alley
- Chartwell Green
- Chattis Hill
- Chawton
- Cheriton
- Chessel Bay
- Chidden
- Chilbolton
- Chilbolton Down
- Chilcomb
- Chilton Candover
- Chilworth
- Chineham
- Chithurst
- Church Crookham
- Clanfield
- Clanville
- Clarendon Way
- Cliddesden
- Cold Ash Hill
- Colden Common
- Cole Henley
- Colemore
- Compton
- Conford
- Coombe
- Copnor
- Copythorne
- Corhampton
- Corhampton and Meonstoke
- Cosham
- Cottonworth
- Cove
- Cowplain
- Coxford
- Crampmoor
- Crawley
- Crockerhill
- Crondall
- Crookham Village
- Crow
- Crux Easton - Curbridge
- Curdridge

== D ==
- Damerham
- Darby Green
- Deadwater
- Deane
- Denmead
- Denvilles
- Dibden
- Dibden Purlieu
- Dipley
- Ditcham
- Dogmersfield
- Dora's Green
- Downton
- Drayton
- Droxford
- Dummer
- Dunbridge
- Dunley
- Durford Wood
- Durley
- Durley Mill
- Durley Street

== E ==
- East Anton
- East Boldre
- East Cholderton
- East Dean
- East End
- East Hampshire AONB
- East Hampshire Hangers
- East Hill
- East Martin
- East Meon
- East Mills
- East Stratton
- East Tisted
- East Tytherley
- East Wellow
- East Woodhay
- East Worldham
- **Eastleigh**
- Eastney
- Easton
- Eastrop Park
- Ecchinswell
- Ecchinswell, Sydmonton and Bishops Green
- Eling
- Ellingham
- Ellingham, Harbridge and Ibsley
- Ellisfield
- Elvetham Heath
- Embley
- Emery Down
- Empshott
- Emsworth
- Enham Alamein
- Eversley
- Eversley Centre
- Eversley Cross
- Everton
- Ewhurst
- Ewshot
- Exbury
- Exbury and Lepe
- Exbury Gardens
- Exton
- Eyeworth Pond

== F ==
- Faccombe
- Fair Oak
- Fair Oak and Horton Heath
- **Fareham**
- Fareham Common
- Farleigh Hill
- Farleigh Wallop
- Farlington
- **Farnborough**
- Farringdon
- Farther Common
- Fawley
- Finchdean
- Finkley
- Finkley Down
- Firgo
- Fishers Pond
- **Fleet**
- Fleet, Hayling Island
- Flexcombe
- Fobdown
- **Fordingbridge**
- Forest Corner
- Forton
- Four Marks
- Fox Amport
- Foxcotte
- Fratton
- Freefolk
- Frenchmoor
- Fritham
- Frogham
- Froxfield Green
- Froyle
- Fullerton
- Funtley
- Funtley Deviation
- Furze Hill
- Fyfield

== G ==
- Godshill
- Godshill Green
- Godshill Wood
- Golden Pot
- Goleigh Hill
- Goodworth Clatford
- Gore End
- Gorley Lynch
- **Gosport**
- Grateley
- Grayshott
- Great Shoddesden
- Greatham
- Greywell
- Griggs Green
- Gundleton

== H ==
- Hale
- Hale Park
- Hale Purlieu
- Hamble-le-Rice
- Hambledon
- Hammer Bottom
- Hampshire Downs
- Hangers Way
- Hangersley
- Hannington
- Harbridge
- Hardley
- Hardway
- Harestock
- Hare Warren
- Hart Plain
- Hartfordbridge
- Hartley Mauditt
- Hartley Wespall
- Hartley Wintney
- Hatch Warren
- Hatherden
- Hattingley
- **Havant**
- Hawkley
- Hawley
- Hayling Island
- Hazeley
- Head Down
- Headbourne Worthy
- Headley, Basingstoke and Deane
- Headley, East Hampshire
- Headley Down
- Heath End
- Heath House
- Heckfield
- Heckfield Heath
- **Hedge End**
- Henwood Down
- Herriard
- High Cross
- Highbridge
- Highclere
- Highfield
- Hightown
- Highwood
- Hill Brow
- Hill Head
- Hillyfields
- Hilsea
- Hiltingbury
- Hinton
- Hinton Admiral
- Hinton Ampner
- Hinton Daubney
- Holbury
- Hollywater
- Holt End
- Holybourne
- Holybourne Hill
- Hook, Basingstoke
- Hook, Warsash
- Hook Common
- Hordle
- Horndean
- Horsebridge
- Horton Heath
- Houghton
- Houghton Down
- Hound
- Hound Green
- Hungerford
- Hunton
- Hursley
- Hurstbourne Priors
- Hurstbourne Tarrant
- Hyde
- **Hythe**

== I ==
- Ibsley
- Ibthorpe
- Ibworth
- Idsworth
- Inhurst
- Isington
- Itchen Abbas
- Itchen Stoke
- Itchen Urban District
- Itchen Valley

== K ==
- Kempshott
- Keyhaven
- Kilmeston
- Kimbridge
- Kimpton
- Kimpton Down
- King Alfred's Way
- King's Hill
- King's Somborne
- King's Way
- Kings Worthy
- Kingsclere
- Kingsley
- Kingston (Portsmouth)
- Kingston (Ringwood)
- Knights Enham
- Knightwood
- Knowle

== L ==
- Langley
- Langrish
- Langstone
- Lasham
- Laverstoke
- Leckford
- Lee
- Lee-on-the-Solent
- Leigh Park
- Lepe
- Linbrook
- Linbrook Lake
- Lindford
- Linford
- Linkenholt
- Linwood
- Liphook
- Liss
- Liss Forest
- Litchfield
- Litchfield and Woodcott
- Little Ann
- Little Down
- Little Hatherden
- Little London (Andover)
- Little London (Tadley)
- Little Posbrook
- Little Shoddesden
- Little Somborne
- Littleton
- Lockerley
- Locks Heath
- Lomer
- Long Common
- Long Sutton
- Longmoor
- Longparish
- Longstock
- Longstock Park
- Lopshill
- Lovedean
- Lower Chute
- Lower Common
- Lower Daggons
- Lower Farringdon
- Lower Froyle
- Lower Swanwick
- Lower Upham
- Lower Wield
- Lower Woodcott
- Lower Wyke
- Lychpit
- **Lymington**
- **Lyndhurst**

== M ==
- Magdalen Hill Down
- Malshanger
- Mapledurwell
- Marchwood
- Marsh Court
- Martin
- Martyr Worthy
- Matley Bog
- Mattingley
- Maybush
- Medstead
- Mengham
- Meon
- Meonstoke
- Micheldever
- Micheldever Station
- Michelmersh
- Middle Wallop
- Middle Wyke
- Milford on Sea
- Mill Lane
- Milton
- Minstead
- Mislingford
- Mockbeggar
- Monk Sherborne
- Monkwood
- Monxton
- Morestead
- Mortimer West End
- Mottisfont
- Moundsmere

== N ==
- Nately Scures
- Neatham
- Nether Wallop
- Netherton
- Netley
- Netley Abbey
- **New Alresford**
- New Copse
- New Forest
- **New Milton**
- Newfound
- Newnham
- Newton Stacey
- Newton Valence
- Newtown
- Newtown Common
- Nicholstown
- Norley Wood
- North Baddesley
- North Boarhunt
- North Camp
- North End
- North Gorley
- North Houghton
- North Oakley
- North Stoneham
- North Street
- North Sydmonton
- North Waltham
- North Warnborough
- Northington
- Northington Down
- Northney
- Nursling
- Nursted
- Nutley

== O ==
- Oakham Hill
- Oakhanger
- Oakley
- Oakridge
- Oakshott
- Ocknell Plain
- Odiham
- Ogdens
- Old Alresford
- Old Basing
- Old Burghclere Lime Quarry
- Old Portsmouth
- Olivers Battery
- Ossemsley
- Otterbourne
- Over Wallop
- Overton
- Ovington
- Ower
- Owslebury
- Owslebury Bottom

== P ==
- Palestine
- Pamber
- Pamber End
- Pamber Green
- Pamber Heath
- Paulsgrove
- Park Gate
- Passfield
- Peartree (ward)
- Pennington
- Penton Corner
- Penton Grafton
- Penton Mewsey
- Penwood
- **Petersfield**
- Pewit Island
- Phoenix Green
- Picket Hill
- Picket Piece
- Picket Post
- Picket Twenty
- Pidham Hill
- Pilgrims' Trail
- Pill Heath
- Pilley
- Pilot Hill
- Pinewood
- Pitt
- Plaitford
- Plastow Green
- Popham
- Port Solent
- **Portchester**
- Portmore
- Portsea and Portsea Island
- **Portsmouth** (Note: The two port cities including their chief suburbs named in those articles are independent unitary authorities within the ceremonial (and traditional) county.)
- Poulner
- Preston Candover
- Priors Dean
- Privett
- Purbrook
- Purbrook Heath

== Q ==
- Quarley
- Queen Elizabeth Country Park
- Quidhampton

== R ==
- Ragged Appleshaw
- Rake
- Ramridge Park
- Ramsdean
- Ramsdell
- Red Hill
- Red Post Bridge
- Red Rice
- Redenham
- Redenham Park
- **Ringwood**
- Ringwood and Fordingbridge Rural District
- Rockbourne
- Rockford
- **Romsey**
- Romsey Extra
- Ropley
- Ropley Dean
- Rotherwick
- Rowland's Castle
- Rownhams
- Rudmore
- Rye

== S ==
- Sandford
- Sandleheath
- Sarisbury
- Sarisbury Green
- Segensworth West
- Selborne
- Selborne Hill
- Shalden
- Shawford
- Shedfield
- Sheet
- Sherborne St John
- Sherfield English
- Sherfield on Loddon
- Sherfield Park
- Shipton Bellinger
- Shipwrights Way
- Shirrell Heath
- Shobley
- Shootash
- Sidown Hill
- Silchester
- Sleaford
- Smannell
- Snoddington
- Soberton
- Soberton and Newtown Walk
- Soldridge
- Somerley
- Somerstown
- South Baddesley
- South Boarhunt
- South Coast Plain
- South Gorley
- South Ham
- South Hampshire Coast
- South Hampshire Lowlands
- South Harewood
- South Hay
- South Hayling
- South Litchfield
- South Tidworth (until 1991) (Note: South Tidworth was transferred to Wiltshire in 1991.)
- South Town
- South Warnborough
- South Wonston
- **Southampton**
- Southrope
- Southsea
- Southwick
- Southwick and Widley
- Southwood
- Spanish Green
- Sparsholt
- Spithead
- St Cross
- St Mary Bourne
- Stamshaw
- Standford
- Stanmore
- Stansted
- Stansted Park
- Staunton Way
- Steep
- Steep Marsh
- Steventon
- **Stockbridge**
- Stoke (Basingstoke and Deane)
- Stoke (Hayling Is)
- Stoke Charity
- Stokes Bay
- Stoney Cross
- Stratfield Saye
- Stratfield Turgis
- Stroud
- Stubbington
- Stuckton
- Sutton Scotney
- Swanmore
- Swanwick
- Swarraton
- Sway

== T ==
- **Tadley**
- Tangley
- Temple Valley
- Thedden
- Three Castles Path
- Thruxton
- Thruxton Down
- Tichborne
- Tickley
- Timsbury
- Tinkers Cross
- Tipner
- Tipner Lake
- Tiptoe
- Titchfield
- Totton and Eling
- Tourner Bury
- Tufton
- Tufton Warren
- Tunworth
- Turgis Green
- Turmer
- Twyford
- Twyford Moors

== U ==
- Up Nately
- Up Somborne
- Upham
- Upper Canterton
- Upper Chute
- Upper Clatford
- Upper Enham
- Upper Farringdon
- Upper Froyle
- Upper Wield
- Upper Woodcott
- Upper Wootton
- Upton, Hurstbourne Tarrant (near Andover)
- Upton, Nursling (near Southampton)
- Upton Grey

== V ==
- Valley Park, Chandler's Ford
- Vernham Dean
- Vernham Street
- Viables

== W ==
- Wadwick
- Waggoners Wells
- Walhampton
- Waltham Chase
- War Down
- Warblington
- Warnborough Green
- Warnford
- Warsash
- **Waterlooville**
- Weaversdown
- Wecock Farm
- Weeke
- Well
- Wellington Country Park
- Wellow
- Wells-in-the-Field
- West End
- West Green
- West Heath
- West Liss
- West Meon
- West of the River Alver
- West Stratton
- West Tisted
- West Town
- West Tytherley
- West Wellow
- West Worldham
- Weston (Petersfield)
- Weston (Southampton)
- Weston Colley
- Weston Corbett
- Weston Patrick
- Wether Down
- Weyhill
- Wheatham Hill
- Wheatley
- Wherwell
- Wherwell Wood
- **Whitchurch**
- Whitehall
- Whitehill
- Whiteley
- Whitnal
- Whitsbury
- Whitsbury Common
- Whitsbury Cross
- Whitway
- Wickham
- Wickham Common
- Widley
- Wield
- Wildhern
- **Winchester**
- Winchfield
- Winchfield Green
- Winklebury
- Winnall
- Winslade
- Winsor
- Wintershill
- Wivelrod
- Wolverton
- Wolverton Common
- Wonston
- Wood End
- Woodgreen
- Woodlands
- Woodmancott
- Woolmer
- Woolston
- Woolton Hill
- Wootton St Lawrence
- Worlds End
- Worldham
- Worthy Down
- Worting
- Wyck
- Wymering

== Y ==
Yateley

== See also ==
- Places of interest in Hampshire
- List of settlements in Hampshire by population
- List of places in England
