= Old Burghclere Lime Quarry =

Site of Special Scientific Interest in Hampshire, England

Coordinates: 51.313769°N 1.324496°W

Old Burghclere Lime Quarry SSSI is a 4.61 ha (11.4 acres) biological Site of Special Scientific Interest at Burghclere in Hampshire, notified in 1979. The Lime Quarry was actively worked until the beginning of the 20th century, and since then has been left to nature, resulting in a unique mix of flora and fauna becoming established at the site.

The site is located at grid reference SU473573, to the south of the village of Old Burghclere, in the county of Hampshire. Nearby to the west lies Beacon Hill and to the southeast is Ladle Hill and Watership Down. The A34 runs immediately to the west of the site the Ladle Hill and Beacon Hill to the east.

== Sources ==
- English Nature citation sheet for the site (accessed 18 January 2014)
