= Crockerhill =

Crockerhill may refer to:

- Crockerhill, Hampshire
- Crockerhill, West Sussex
