= Whitway =

Hamlet in Hampshire, England

Coordinates: 51.333333°N 1.350000°W

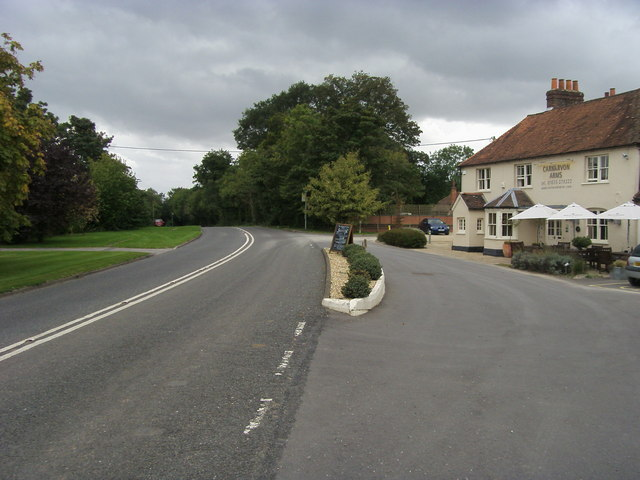
- Old A34 and the Carnavon Arms

- Location within Hampshire
- OS grid reference: SU4538059560
- District: Basingstoke and Deane
- Shire county: Hampshire
- Region: South East
- Country: England
- Sovereign state: United Kingdom
- Post town: NEWBURY
- Postcode district: RG20
- Police: Hampshire and Isle of Wight
- Fire: Hampshire and Isle of Wight
- Ambulance: South Central

Whitway is a hamlet in the civil parish of Burghclere in the Basingstoke and Deane district of Hampshire, England. Its nearest town is Newbury, which lies approximately 5 miles (8.1 km) north from the hamlet.
