= South Boarhunt =

Village in Hampshire, England

Coordinates: 50.869582°N 1.140039°W

- Location within Hampshire
- OS grid reference: SU6061008139
- District: Winchester
- Shire county: Hampshire
- Region: South East
- Country: England
- Sovereign state: United Kingdom
- Post town: FAREHAM
- Postcode district: PO17
- Police: Hampshire and Isle of Wight
- Fire: Hampshire and Isle of Wight
- Ambulance: South Central
- UK Parliament: Winchester

South Boarhunt is a small village in the civil parish of Boarhunt in the City of Winchester district of Hampshire, England. Its nearest town is Fareham, which lies approximately 2 miles (3.2 km) south-west from the village.
