= Valley Park, Chandler's Ford =

Town in Hampshire, England

Coordinates: 50.985°N 1.395°W

Valley Park
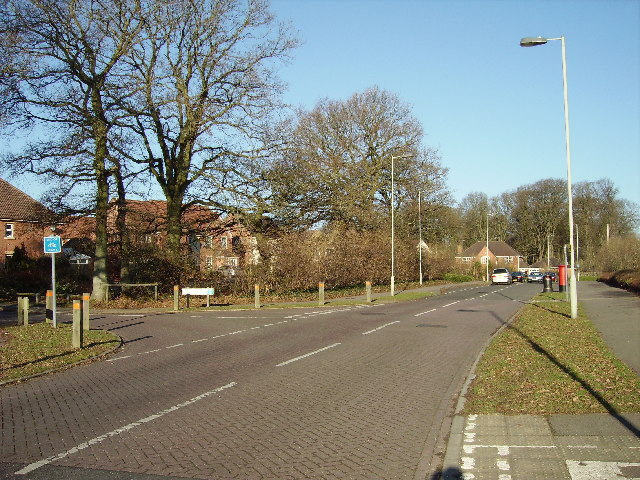
- Sky's Wood Road

- Location within Hampshire
- Population: 7,551 (2017 estimate)
- OS grid reference: SU42532079
- Civil parish: Valley Park
- District: Test Valley
- Shire county: Hampshire
- Region: South East
- Country: England
- Sovereign state: United Kingdom
- Post town: EASTLEIGH
- Postcode district: SO53 4
- Dialling code: 023
- Police: Hampshire and Isle of Wight
- Fire: Hampshire and Isle of Wight
- Ambulance: South Central
- UK Parliament: Eastleigh
- Website: http://www.valleyparkparish.org/

Valley Park is a civil parish and a new town in the Test Valley district of Hampshire, England. The part of the parish is called Knightwood.

== History ==
Valley Park sits near an Iron Age settlement.

The area underwent a large amount of development from the mid-1980s to the 2000s. West of Knightwood Road was developed starting in 1994 and doubled the size of the town.

== Amenities ==
Valley Park has local schools, a supermarket, a community centre and a leisure centre.
