= Red Post Bridge =

Village in Hampshire, England

Coordinates: 51.204141°N 1.536026°W

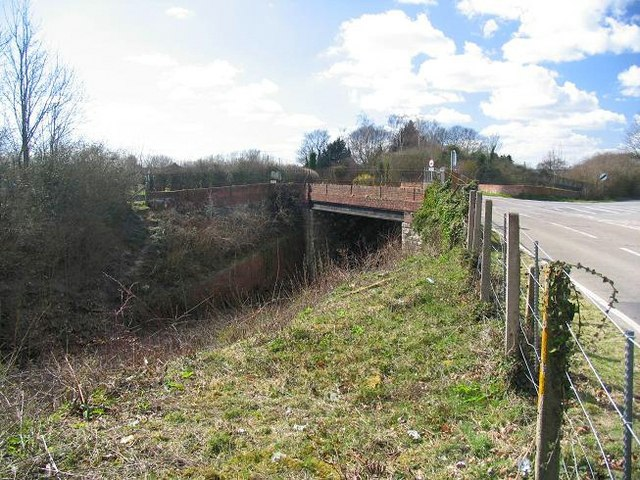
- Red Post Bridge connecting the village to Andover

- Location within Hampshire
- OS grid reference: SU3251145094
- District: Test Valley
- Shire county: Hampshire
- Region: South East
- Country: England
- Sovereign state: United Kingdom
- Post town: ANDOVER
- Postcode district: SP11 7
- Dialling code: 01264
- Police: Hampshire and Isle of Wight
- Fire: Hampshire and Isle of Wight
- Ambulance: South Central
- UK Parliament: North West Hampshire

Red Post Bridge is a small village in the civil parish of Monxton in the Test Valley district of Hampshire, England. Its nearest town is Andover, which lies approximately 2.75 miles (4.4. km) north-east from the village.

It was potentially the site of the Battle of Andover on 18 October 1644 during the English Civil War.
