= Places of interest in Hampshire =

This is a list of places of interest in the ceremonial county of Hampshire, England. See List of places in Hampshire for a list of settlements in the county.

== Places of interest ==
Key
	Abbey/Priory/Cathedral
Accessible open space	Accessible open space
	Amusement/Theme Park
	Castle
Country Park	Country Park
	English Heritage
	Forestry Commission
Heritage railway	Heritage railway
Historic house	Historic House
Places of Worship	Places of Worship
Museum (free) Museum	Museum (free/not free)
National Trust	National Trust
	Theatre
	Zoo

- Aldershot Military Museum
- Beaulieu Abbey and the National Motor Museum
- Beacon Hill, Burghclere, Hampshire
- Broadlands
- The D-Day Story
- Exbury Gardens & House
- Farnborough Air Sciences Museum
- Farnborough Airshow
- Fleet Pond
- Highclere Castle
- HMS Victory
- Itchen Valley Country Park
- Jane Austen's House Museum
- Lakeside Country Park
- Lepe Country Park
- Manor Farm Country Park
- Marwell Wildlife
- Mary Rose
- Mid-Hants Watercress Railway
- Mottisfont Abbey
- Netley Abbey
- New Forest
- New Forest Museum
- River Avon
- River Hamble
- River Itchen
- Portchester Castle
- Portsdown Hill
- Portsmouth Historic Dockyard inc. the Royal Naval Museum and historic ships
- Queen Elizabeth Country Park
- River Meon
- River Test
- Romsey Abbey
- Royal Armouries Museum (Fort Nelson)
- Royal Victoria Country Park
- Silchester Roman Town
- Southampton Water
- South Downs Way, a long distance footpath
- Southsea Castle
- Spinnaker Tower
- Staunton Country Park
- Stratfield Saye House
- St Michael's Abbey
- The Vyne
- Wellington Country Park
- Whitchurch Silk Mill
- Winchester Cathedral
- Winchester City Mill

== See also ==
- List of Grade I listed buildings in Hampshire
