= Hare Warren =

Hamlet in Hampshire, England

Coordinates: 51.294836°N 1.301991°W

- Location within Hampshire
- OS grid reference: SU4876655310
- District: Basingstoke and Deane
- Shire county: Hampshire
- Region: South East
- Country: England
- Sovereign state: United Kingdom
- Post town: WHITCHURCH
- Postcode district: RG28
- Dialling code: 01256
- Police: Hampshire and Isle of Wight
- Fire: Hampshire and Isle of Wight
- Ambulance: South Central
- UK Parliament: Basingstoke

Hare Warren is a hamlet in the Basingstoke and Deane district of Hampshire, England. At the 2011 Census the population of the hamlet was included in the civil parish of Ecchinswell, Sydmonton and Bishops Green. Its nearest town is Whitchurch, which lies approximately 4.5 miles (7.2 km) south-west from the hamlet. The hamlet is situated in the North Downs Area of Outstanding Natural Beauty.
