= Ashley Warren =

Village in Hampshire, England

Coordinates: 51.2971°N 1.2973°W

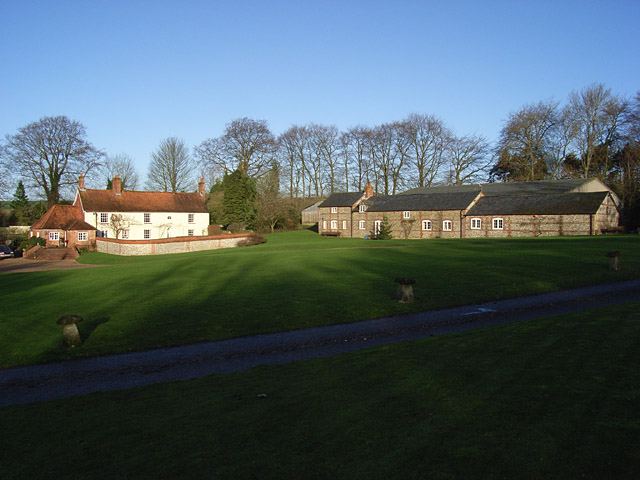
- Ashley Warren Farm

- Location within Hampshire
- OS grid reference: SU491555
- Civil parish: Ecchinswell, Sydmonton and Bishops Green
- District: Basingstoke and Deane
- Shire county: Hampshire
- Region: South East
- Country: England
- Sovereign state: United Kingdom
- Post town: BASINGSTOKE
- Postcode district: RG25
- Dialling code: 01256
- Police: Hampshire and Isle of Wight
- Fire: Hampshire and Isle of Wight
- Ambulance: South Central
- UK Parliament: North West Hampshire

Ashley Warren is a hamlet in the Basingstoke and Deane district of Hampshire, England. The settlement is within the civil parish of Ecchinswell, Sydmonton and Bishops Green, and is located approximately 7.3 miles (11.7 km) south of Newbury.

== Governance ==
The hamlet is part of the civil parish of Ecchinswell, Sydmonton and Bishops Green and the Burghclere, Highclere and St Mary Bourne ward of Basingstoke and Deane borough council. The borough council is a Non-metropolitan district of Hampshire County Council.
