= Adbury =

Village in Hampshire, England

Coordinates: 51.3681°N 1.3029°W

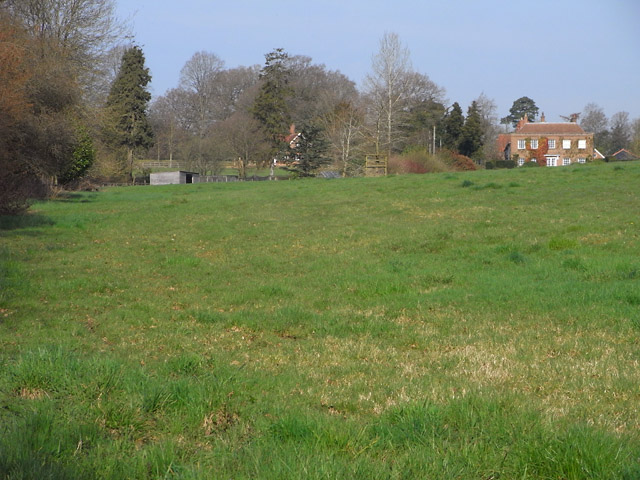
- Pasture in Adbury

- Location within Hampshire
- OS grid reference: SU484308
- Civil parish: Burghclere
- District: Basingstoke and Deane
- Shire county: Hampshire
- Region: South East
- Country: England
- Sovereign state: United Kingdom
- Post town: NEWBURY
- Postcode district: RG20
- Dialling code: 01635
- Police: Hampshire and Isle of Wight
- Fire: Hampshire and Isle of Wight
- Ambulance: South Central
- UK Parliament: Newbury

Adbury is a village in Hampshire, United Kingdom. The settlement is within the civil parish of Burghclere, and is located approximately 2.5 miles (4.0 km) south-east of Newbury.

== Governance ==
The village of Adbury is part of the civil parish of Burghclere, and is part of the Burghclere, Highclere and St. Mary Bourne ward of Basingstoke and Deane borough council. The borough council is a Non-metropolitan district of Hampshire County Council.
