= Heath End, Hampshire =

Village in Hampshire, England

Coordinates: 51.3587°N 1.1719°W

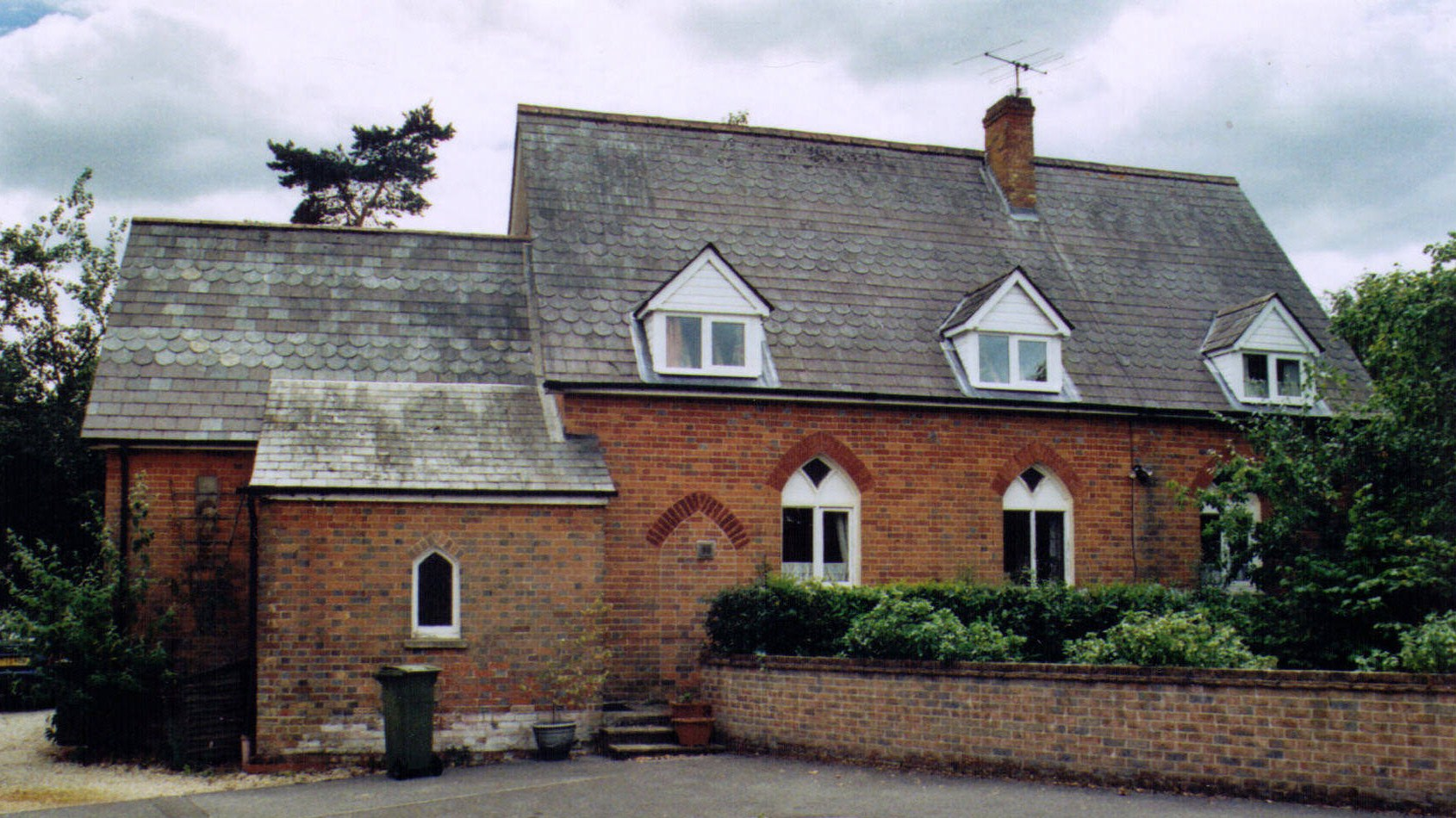
- Former church in Heath End

- Location within Hampshire
- Civil parish: Tadley
- District: Basingstoke and Deane
- Shire county: Hampshire
- Region: South East
- Country: England
- Sovereign state: United Kingdom
- Post town: Tadley
- Postcode district: RG26
- Dialling code: 0118
- Police: Hampshire and Isle of Wight
- Fire: Hampshire and Isle of Wight
- Ambulance: South Central
- UK Parliament: North West Hampshire

Heath End is a small village between Tadley and Baughurst in Hampshire, England.

== Governance ==
The village is part of the civil parish of Tadley and is part of the Baughurst and Tadley North ward of Basingstoke and Deane borough council. The borough council is a Non-metropolitan district of Hampshire County Council.

== Church ==
Heath End has a red brick Church dedicated to Saint Mary which was built in 1874.

== See also ==
- List of places in Hampshire
