= Sydmonton =

Coordinates: 51.3169°N 1.2968°W

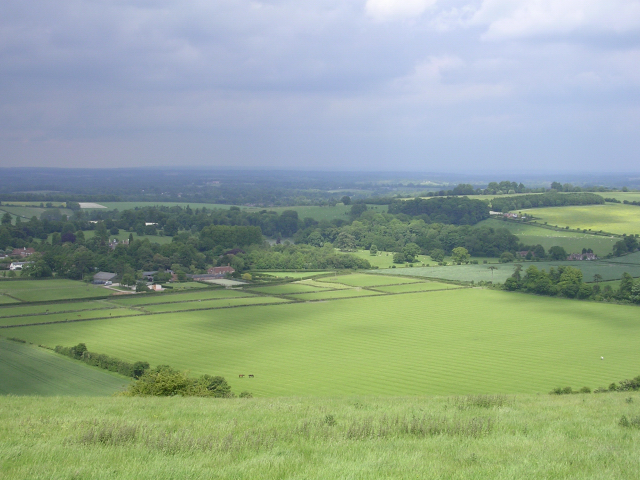
- Sydmonton from Ladle Hill

- Location within Hampshire
- Civil parish: Ecchinswell, Sydmonton and Bishops Green, formerly in the parish of Kingsclere
- District: Basingstoke and Deane
- Shire county: Hampshire
- Region: South East
- Country: England
- Sovereign state: United Kingdom
- Post town: NEWBURY
- Postcode district: RG26
- Dialling code: 01256
- Police: Hampshire and Isle of Wight
- Fire: Hampshire and Isle of Wight
- Ambulance: South Central
- UK Parliament: North West Hampshire

Sydmonton is a small village, estate and former civil parish, now in the parish of Ecchinswell, Sydmonton and Bishops Green, in the Basingstoke and Deane district of Hampshire, England. Its nearest town is Newbury, which lies approximately 7 miles (11 km) north-west from the village. In 1931 the parish had a population of 139.

== Governance ==
The village is now part of the civil parish of "Ecchinswell, Sydmonton and Bishops Green", historically having been within the parish of Kingsclere. It is part of the Burghclere, Highclere and St Mary Bourne ward of Basingstoke and Deane Borough Council. The borough council is a non-metropolitan district of Hampshire County Council.

On 1 April 1932 the parish was abolished and merged with Ecchinswell to form "Ecchinswell and Sydmonton".

== History ==
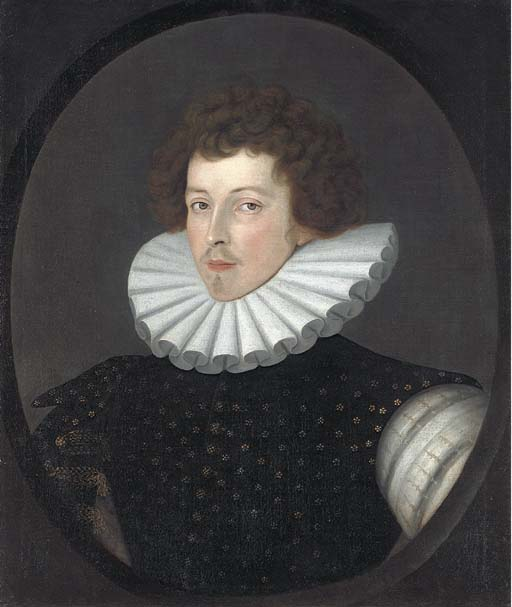
Portrait by William Segar of Sir Henry Kingsmill (1587-1625), (knighted, 1611), of Sydmonton, son of Sir William Kingsmill (d. 1600), by Anne, daughter of William Wilkes of Middleton Cheney. His wife was Bridget daughter and co-heir of John White of Southwick, Hampshire.

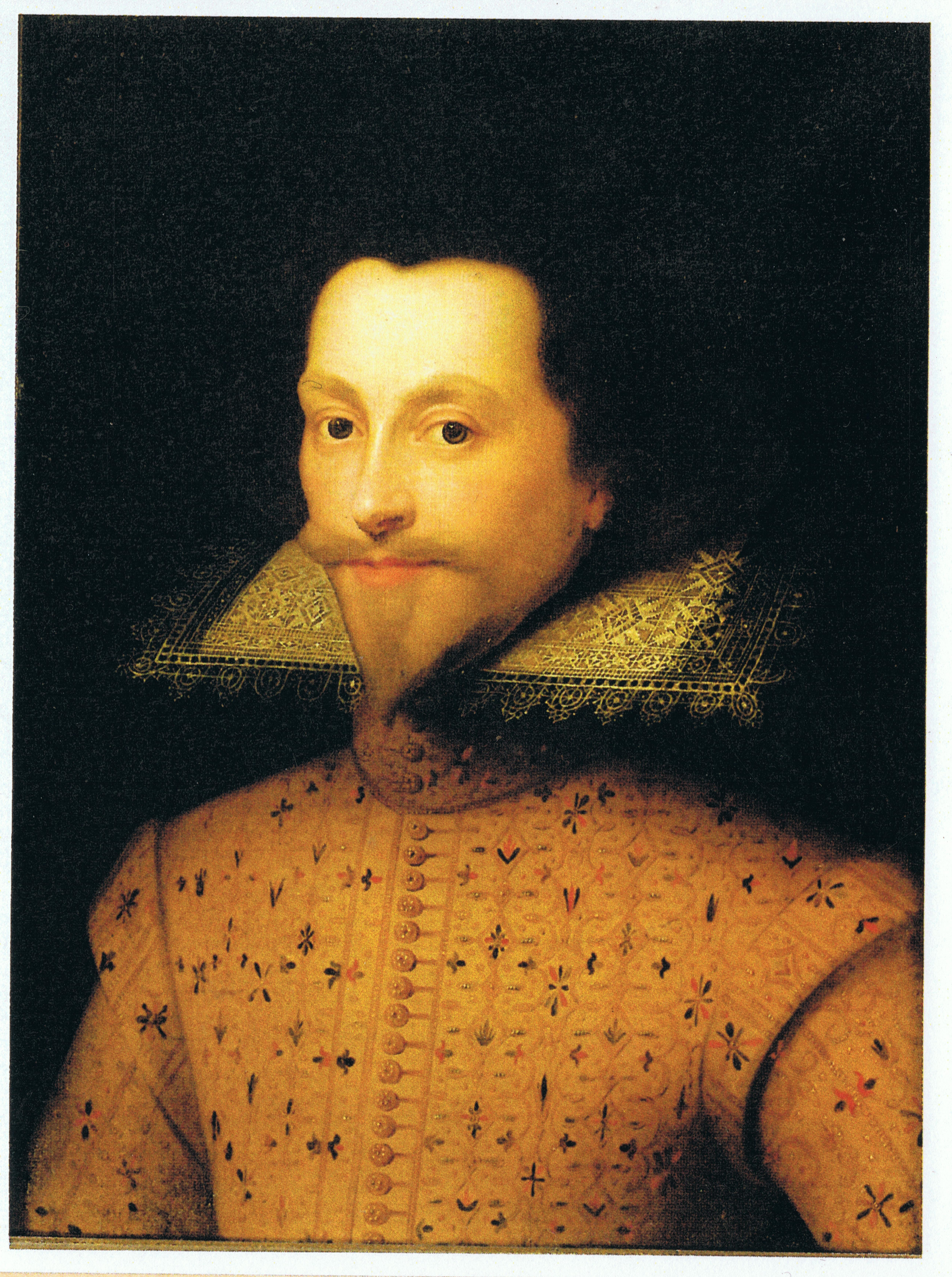
Portrait of Sir Henry Kingsmill (1587-1625) by William Larkin. (Oil on panel, 23 x 17 inches). Sir Henry lived at Sydmonton from 1619 until his death in 1625.

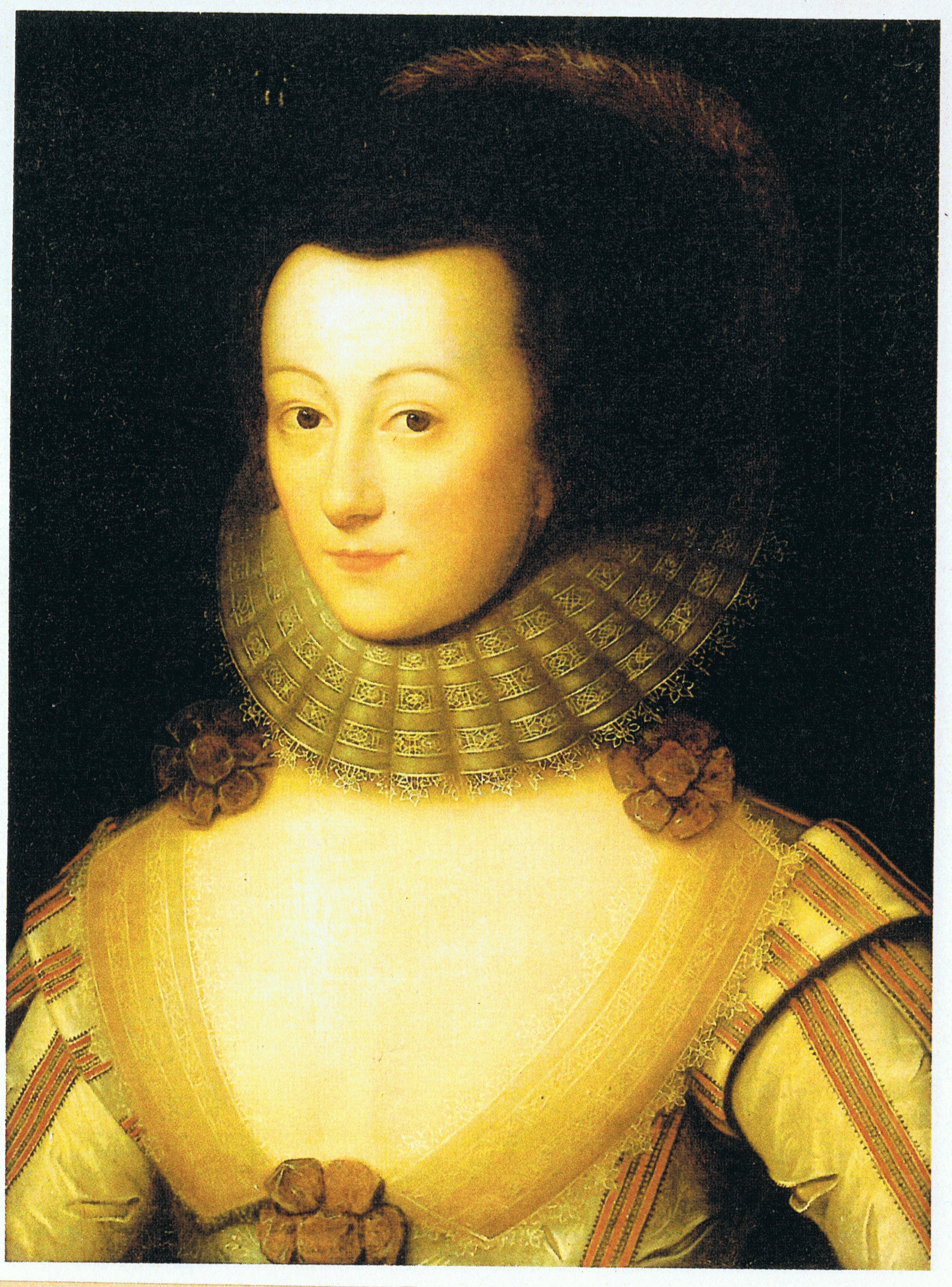
Portrait of Bridget White, Lady Kingsmill (died 1670) by William Larkin. Buried Kingsclere. (Oil on panel, 23 x 17 inches).

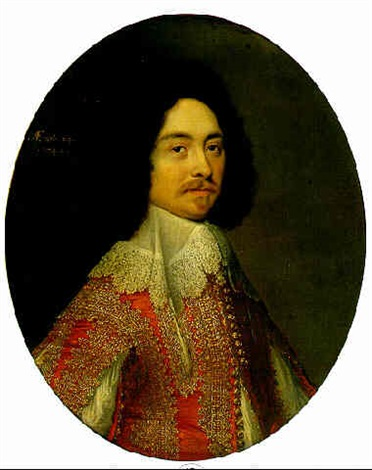
Gilbert Jackson's portrait of Sir William Kingsmill (1613-1661), of Sydmonton, 1642.

== Sydmonton Court ==
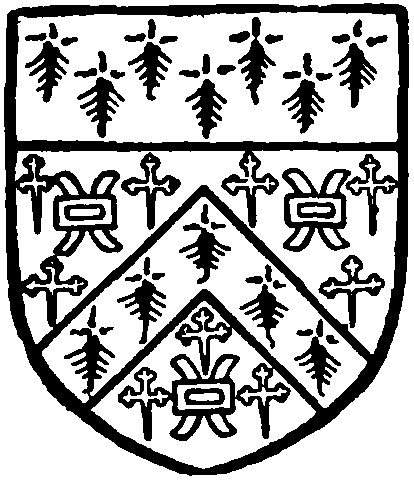
Kingsmill shield. Argent crusilly fitchy sable a cheveron ermine between three mill-rinds sable and a chief ermine.

St Mary, Sydmonton. Copy of a sketch taken about 1830, given to the parish by the Venerable William H. Fearon. Note how the road has subsequently been moved to the south

Sydmonton is the home of the 5000 acre Sydmonton Court estate, formerly the seat of the Kingsmill Family, including Admiral Sir Robert Kingsmill. The estate is currently owned by Andrew Lloyd Webber, Baron Lloyd-Webber, and is home to the annual Sydmonton Festival.

The house is a grade II* listed Tudor manor house originally built to an E-shaped floor plan in the 16th century, but modified several times since then.

The estate came into the hands of the Kingsmill family after the Dissolution of the Monasteries when it was granted by Henry VIII to John Kingsmill. It passed down in the family to Elizabeth Corry, daughter of Frances Kingsmill and Hugh Corry, who married Robert Brice. Robert took the name of Kingsmill in 1766, became an admiral and was created Baronet Kingsmill in 1800. He left Sydmonton to the Rev. John Stephens, vicar of Chewton Mendip, Somerset, who also took the name of Kingsmill in 1806.

Anne Kingsmill (1661–1720), daughter of Sir William Kingsmill, married Heneage Finch and became Lady Winchilsea and a well-known poet.

The Sydmonton Festival is a summer arts festival presented in a deconsecrated 16th century chapel in the grounds of the estate.
