= Ecchinswell =

Village and parish in Hampshire, England

Coordinates: 51°19′59″N 1°17′04″W

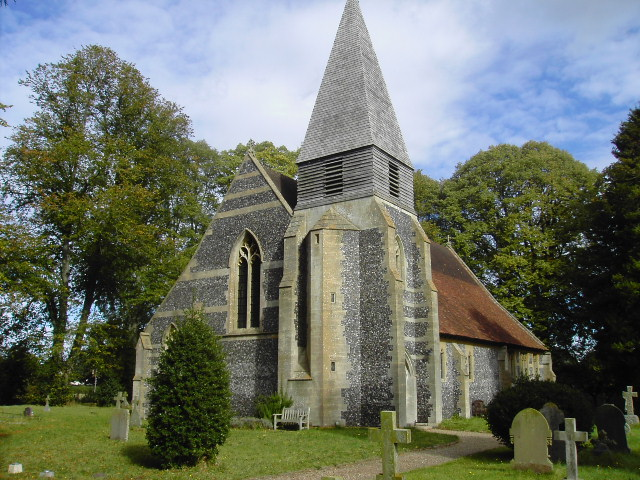
- Ecchinswell Church

- Location within Hampshire
- OS grid reference: SU500597
- Civil parish: Ecchinswell, Sydmonton and Bishops Green
- District: Basingstoke and Deane
- Shire county: Hampshire
- Region: South East
- Country: England
- Sovereign state: United Kingdom
- Post town: Newbury
- Postcode district: RG20
- Police: Hampshire and Isle of Wight
- Fire: Hampshire and Isle of Wight
- Ambulance: South Central

Ecchinswell is a village and former civil parish, now in the parish of Ecchinswell, Sydmonton and Bishops Green, in the Basingstoke and Deane district of Hampshire, England. In 1931 the parish had a population of 295.

The Church of England parish church is a Victorian building dedicated to Saint Lawrence. The original church of St. Lawrence had to be demolished after it fell into disrepair.

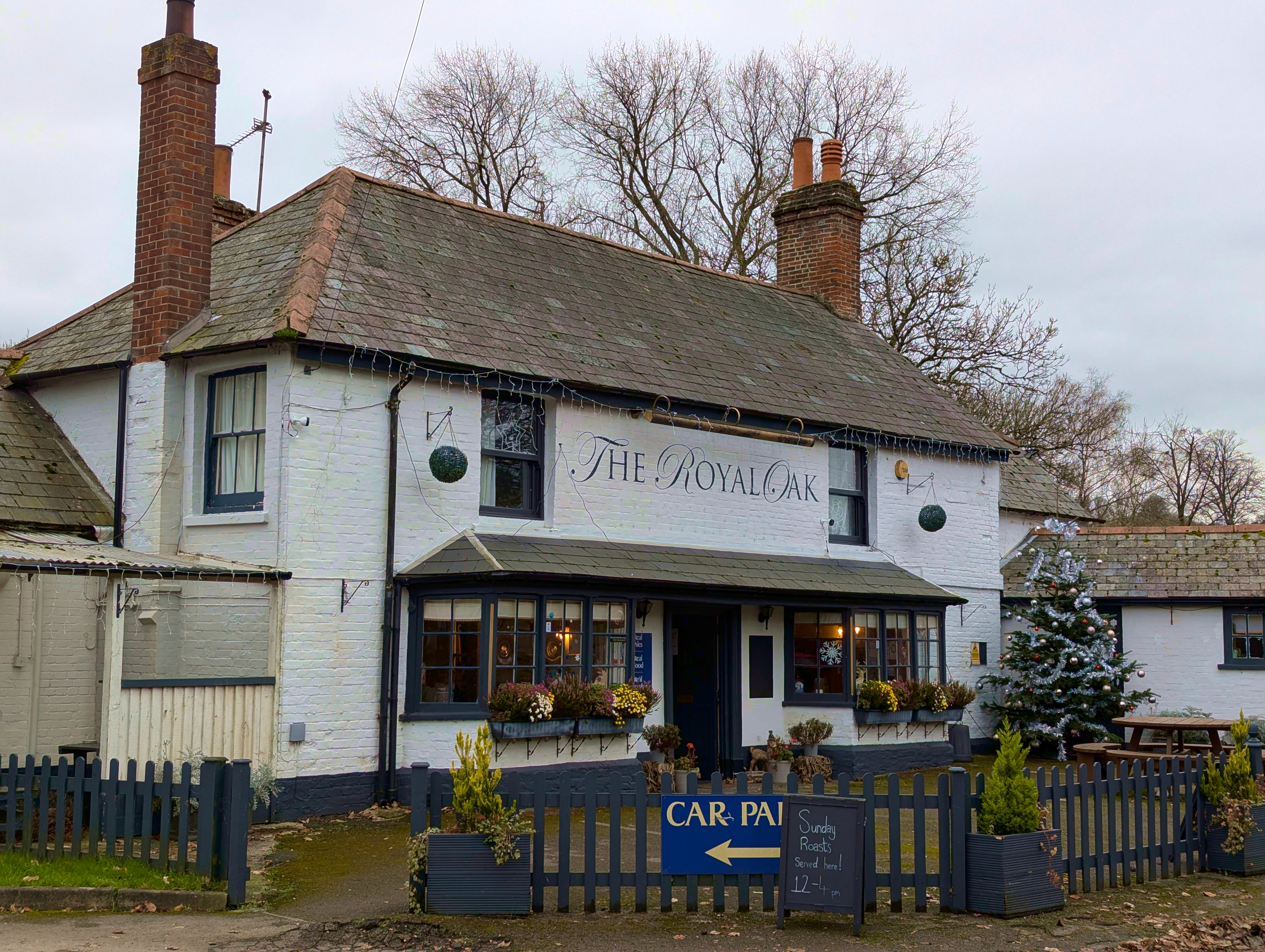
The Royal Oak inn at Ecchinswell, Hampshire, England. December 2024.

The village also has an inn, "The Royal Oak" and some handsome thatched cottages.

== Geography ==
Watership Down, location of Richard Adams' novel of the same name, is just south of Ecchinswell. Ladle Hill on Great Litchfield Down, also lies to the south. Part of the hill is a 10.37 hectares (25.6 acres) biological SSSI, first notified in 1978. The hill has a partially completed Iron Age hill fort on its summit, and the surrounding area is rich in Iron Age tumuli, enclosures, lynchets and field systems. Ladle Hill and Watership Down are easily accessed from the Wayfarer's Walk cross-county footpath that passes through the parish.

== Governance ==
The village of Ecchinswell is part of the Burghclere, Highclere and St Mary Bourne ward of Basingstoke and Deane borough council. The borough council is a Non-metropolitan district of Hampshire County Council. On 1 April 1932 the parish was abolished to form "Ecchinswell and Sydmonton".

== Literature ==
Nuthanger Farm at Ecchinswell features extensively in Richard Adams' Watership Down.

== Notable people ==
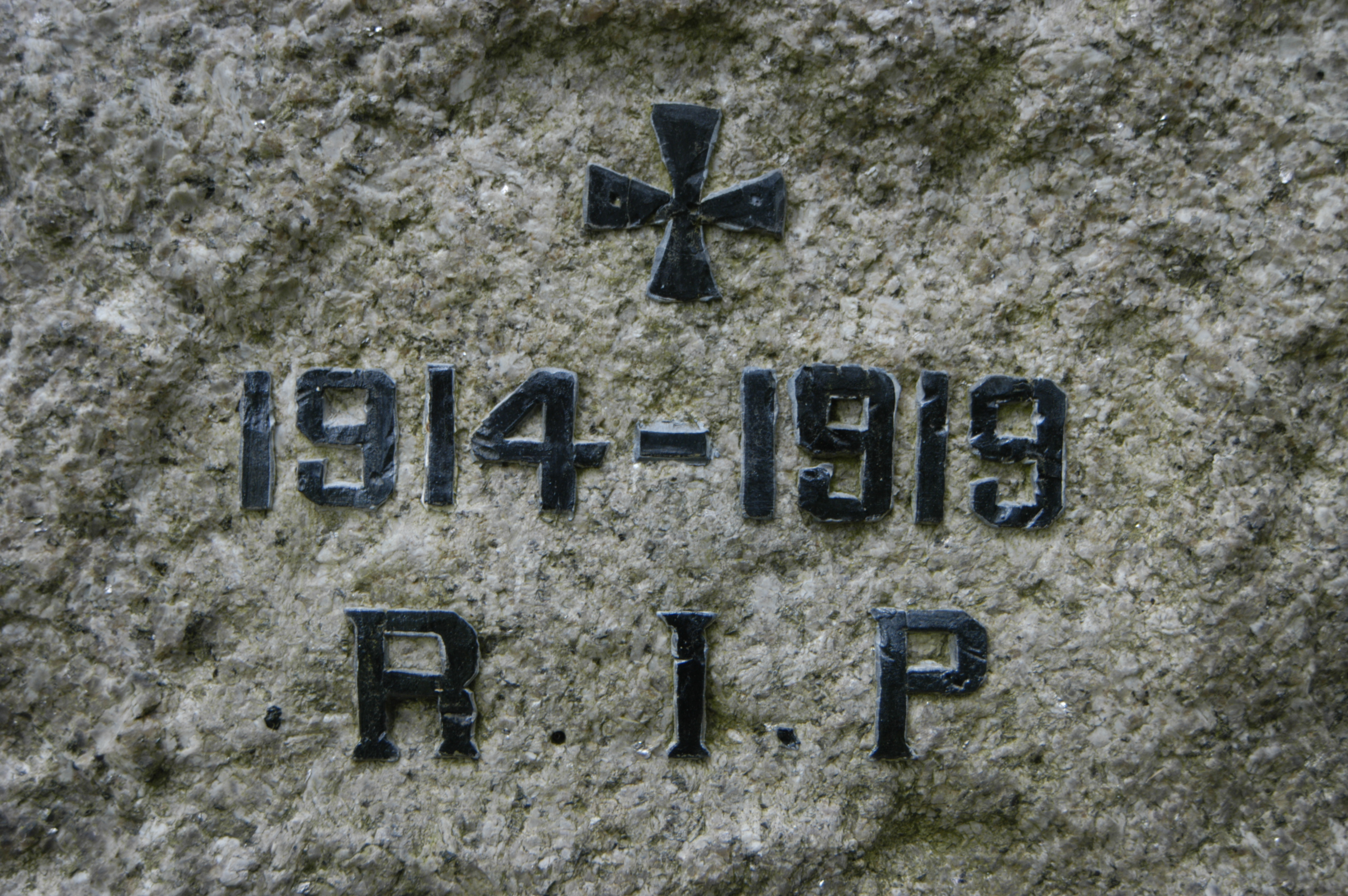
Part of Ecchinswell's War Memorial.

- The potter, Geoffrey Eastop (1921–2014), lived in the village
- Lord Turner of Ecchinswell, former chairman of the Financial Services Authority and the Committee on Climate Change, has a cottage in Ecchinswell
