= Aldern Bridge =

Hamlet in Hampshire, England

Coordinates: 51.371028°N 1.297196°W

- Location within Hampshire
- OS grid reference: SU489636
- District: Basingstoke and Deane
- Shire county: Hampshire
- Region: South East
- Country: England
- Sovereign state: United Kingdom
- Post town: NEWBURY
- Postcode district: RG20
- Dialling code: 01635
- Police: Hampshire and Isle of Wight
- Fire: Hampshire and Isle of Wight
- Ambulance: South Central
- UK Parliament: Newbury

Aldern Bridge is a hamlet in Hampshire, United Kingdom, within the civil parish of Burghclere, approximately 2.3 miles (3.7 km) south-east of Newbury.

== Governance ==
The village of Adbury is part of the civil parish of Burghclere, and is part of the Burghclere, Highclere and St. Mary Bourne ward of Basingstoke and Deane borough council. The borough council is a Non-metropolitan district of Hampshire County Council.
