= North Sydmonton =

Village in Hampshire, England

Coordinates: 51.345877°N 1.289773°W

- Location within Hampshire
- OS grid reference: SU5009862144
- Civil parish: Ecchinswell, Sydmonton and Bishops Green
- District: Basingstoke and Deane
- Shire county: Hampshire
- Region: South East
- Country: England
- Sovereign state: United Kingdom
- Post town: NEWBURY
- Postcode district: RG26
- Dialling code: 01256
- Police: Hampshire and Isle of Wight
- Fire: Hampshire and Isle of Wight
- Ambulance: South Central
- UK Parliament: Basingstoke

North Sydmonton is a small village in the Basingstoke and Deane district of Hampshire, England. Its nearest town is Newbury, which lies approximately 4.3 miles (6.9 km) north-west from the village.

== Governance ==
The village of North Sydmonton is part of the civil parish of Ecchinswell, Sydmonton and Bishops Green, and is part of the Burghclere, Highclere and St Mary Bourne ward of Basingstoke and Deane borough council. The borough council is a Non-metropolitan district of Hampshire County Council.
