= Brock's Green =

Village in Hampshire, England

Coordinates: 51.34°N 1.28°W

- Location within Hampshire
- Civil parish: Ecchinswell, Sydmonton and Bishops Green
- District: Basingstoke and Deane
- Shire county: Hampshire
- Region: South East
- Country: England
- Sovereign state: United Kingdom
- Post town: NEWBURY
- Postcode district: RG26
- Dialling code: 01256
- Police: Hampshire and Isle of Wight
- Fire: Hampshire and Isle of Wight
- Ambulance: South Central
- UK Parliament: Basingstoke

Brock's Green is a hamlet of seven properties within the Parish of Ecchinswell, Sydmonton & Bishops Green, district of Basingstoke and Deane in the county of Hampshire, England. Its nearest town is Newbury, which lies approximately 4.7 miles (7.6 km) north-west from the hamlet.

== Governance ==
The hamlet of Brock's Green is part of the civil parish of Ecchinswell, Sydmonton and Bishops Green and is part of the Burghclere, Highclere and St Mary Bourne ward of Basingstoke and Deane borough council. The borough council is a Non-metropolitan district of Hampshire County Council.
