= Clere School =

Community school in Hampshire, England

The Clere School

Location
- Earlstone Common; Burghclere, Hampshire, RG20 9HP; England
- Coordinates: 51°20′58″N 1°19′16″W

Information
- Type: Community school
- Local authority: Hampshire
- Department for Education URN: 116430 Tables
- Ofsted: Reports
- Head teacher: James Rodgers
- Gender: Co-educational
- Age: 11 to 16
- Enrolment: As of 2025: 468
- Capacity: 725
- Houses: Beacon; Cottington; Ladle; Sidown
- Website: www.clere.hants.sch.uk

The Clere School is a small co-educational community secondary school in Burghclere, Hampshire, England. The headteacher is James Rodgers The school caters for academic years 7 to 11, but does not have a Sixth Form.

== History ==
In 1966 the old boys school in Kingsclere, which had been established in c. 1542 and rebuilt in 1820 and 1861 and became the Secondary Modern School, moved to Burghclere, becoming The Clere School. Among the school equipment taken from Kingsclere to Burghclere was a 1934 "Y" Model Ford, which was used outside school hours in the playground by boys learning to drive.

It gained Specialist Technology College status in September 2003, changed its name to The Clere School and Technology College, and held an official launch of the status on 13 November 2003 with Sir George Young. With the ending of the specialist schools programme in 2011 the school reverted to its former name.

On the afternoon of 7 November 2012, a fire was discovered outside the school's Sports Hall. Local fire crews attended the incident, and prevented the fire from spreading to the inside of the building. The fire resulted in damage to the roof of the building, and several solar panels which were mounted on it.

== Ofsted inspections ==
As of 2025, the school's most recent inspection by Ofsted was in January 2025. The inspection judgements were: Quality of education, and Personal development: Requires improvement; Behaviour and attitudes, and Leadership and management: Inadequate. The inspection found that significant improvement to the school was needed.
