= Wherwell Wood =

Hamlet in Hampshire, England

Coordinates: 51.174769°N 1.458778°W

- Location within Hampshire
- OS grid reference: SU3793241865
- Civil parish: Wherwell
- District: Test Valley
- Shire county: Hampshire
- Region: South East
- Country: England
- Sovereign state: United Kingdom
- Post town: ANDOVER
- Postcode district: SP11
- Dialling code: 01794
- Police: Hampshire and Isle of Wight
- Fire: Hampshire and Isle of Wight
- Ambulance: South Central
- UK Parliament: Romsey and Southampton North

Wherwell Wood is a hamlet in the civil parish of Wherwell in the Test Valley district of Hampshire, England. It lies approximately 2.7 miles (4.4 km) south from Andover, its nearest town. The hamlet is named after Wherwell Wood, a large wood containing 511 acres (207 ha) of woodland and plantations.
