= Lopshill =

Hamlet in Hampshire, England

Coordinates: 50.923205°N 1.875057°W

- Location within Hampshire
- OS grid reference: SU0887813757
- District: New Forest
- Shire county: Hampshire
- Region: South East
- Country: England
- Sovereign state: United Kingdom
- Post town: FORDINGBRIDGE
- Postcode district: SP62
- Dialling code: 01590
- Police: Hampshire and Isle of Wight
- Fire: Hampshire and Isle of Wight
- Ambulance: South Central
- UK Parliament: New Forest West

Lopshill is a hamlet in the New Forest district in Hampshire, England. It is in the civil parish of Damerham. It is about 4 miles (7 km) from the New Forest National Park. The nearest town is Fordingbridge, which lies approximately 4.7 miles (6.4 km) east of the village.
