= Winchfield Green =

Hamlet in Hampshire, England

Coordinates: 51.280689°N 0.881304°W

- Location within Hampshire
- OS grid reference: SU7812254099
- District: Hart
- Shire county: Hampshire
- Region: South East
- Country: England
- Sovereign state: United Kingdom
- Post town: HOOK
- Postcode district: RG27
- Dialling code: 01252
- Police: Hampshire and Isle of Wight
- Fire: Hampshire and Isle of Wight
- Ambulance: South Central
- UK Parliament: North East Hampshire

Winchfield Green is a hamlet in the civil parish of Winchfield in Hampshire, England, a parish listed in the 1086 Domesday Book. Its nearest town is Fleet, which lies approximately 2 miles (3 km) east to the hamlet. The Church of St Mary at the village centre is a Grade I listed building.
