= Pill Heath =

Hamlet in Hampshire, England

Coordinates: 51.278853°N 1.494723°W

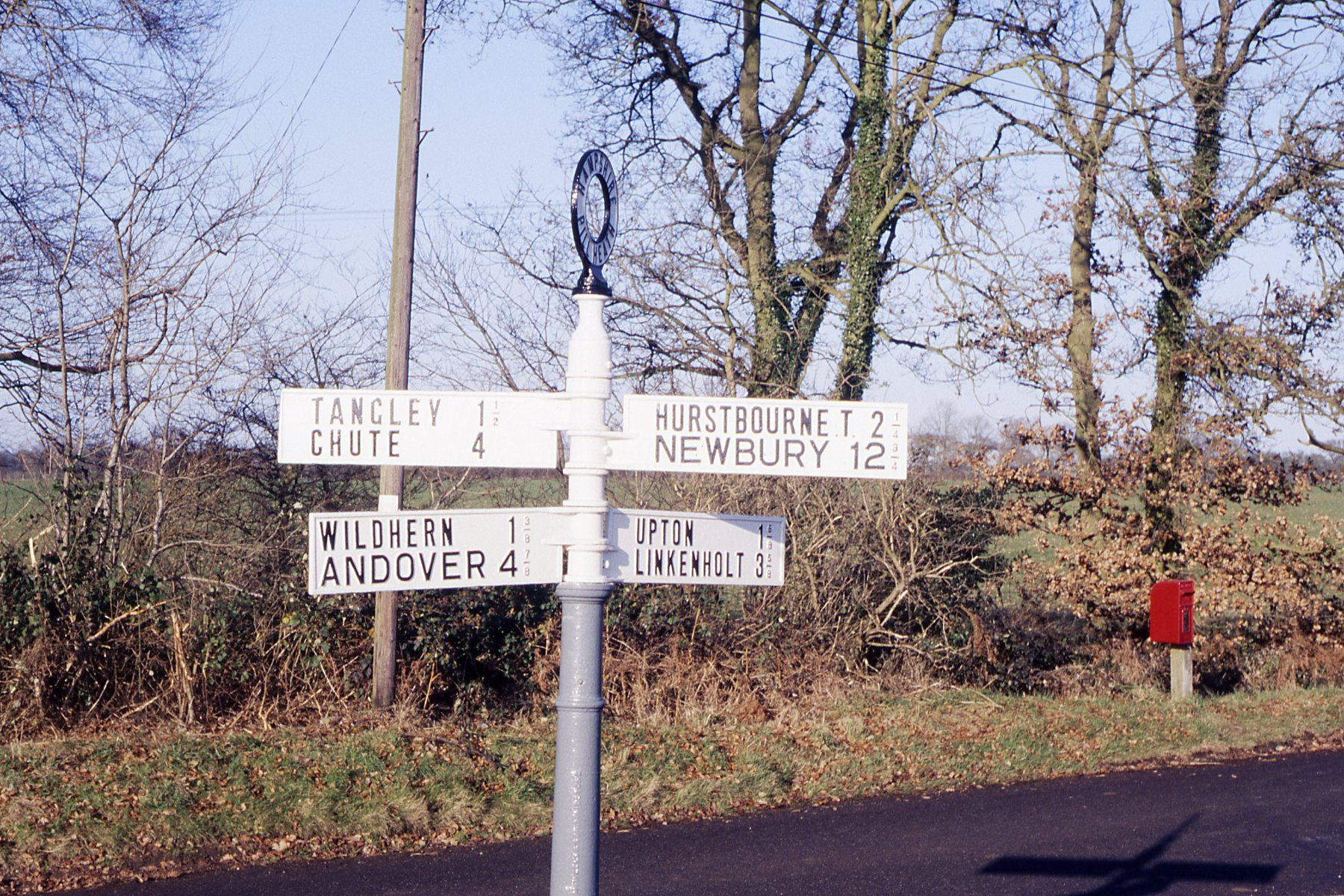
- Signpost at Pill Heath

- Location within Hampshire
- OS grid reference: SU3534053422
- District: Test Valley
- Shire county: Hampshire
- Region: South East
- Country: England
- Sovereign state: United Kingdom
- Post town: ANDOVER
- Postcode district: SP11 0
- Dialling code: 01264
- Police: Hampshire and Isle of Wight
- Fire: Hampshire and Isle of Wight
- Ambulance: South Central
- UK Parliament: North West Hampshire

Pill Heath is a hamlet in the civil parish of Tangley situated in the North Wessex Downs Area of Outstanding Natural Beauty in the Test Valley district of Hampshire, England. According to the Post Office the population of the hamlet at the 2011 Census was in the civil parish of Hurstbourne Tarrant. Its nearest town is Andover, which lies approximately 4.7 miles (7.6 km) south-east from the hamlet.

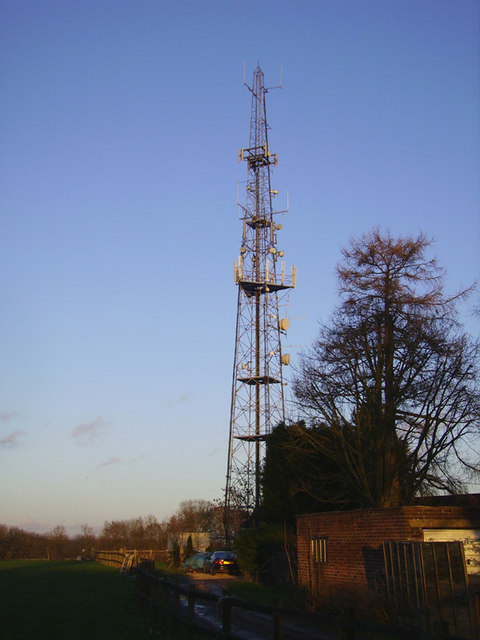
Radio site at Pill Heath farm
