= Fareham Common =

Suburb of Fareham, England

Coordinates: 50.852735°N 1.174099°W

- Location within Hampshire
- OS grid reference: SU5806
- District: Fareham
- Shire county: Hampshire
- Region: South East
- Country: England
- Sovereign state: United Kingdom
- Post town: FAREHAM
- Postcode district: PO14 - PO15
- Dialling code: 01329
- Police: Hampshire and Isle of Wight
- Fire: Hampshire and Isle of Wight
- Ambulance: South Central
- UK Parliament: Fareham and Waterlooville

Fareham Common is a suburb of Fareham, Hampshire. It is 1.3 miles (2.8 km) north of the town centre and is made up of a few industrial estates. It is north of the M27 motorway and the nearest villages are Knowle and Wickham.
