= Wood End, Hampshire =

Hamlet in Hampshire, England

Coordinates: 50.920285°N 1.15413°W

Wood End
- Location within Hampshire
- OS grid reference: SU5955413766
- District: Winchester
- Shire county: Hampshire
- Region: South East
- Country: England
- Sovereign state: United Kingdom
- Post town: FAREHAM
- Postcode district: PO17
- Police: Hampshire and Isle of Wight
- Fire: Hampshire and Isle of Wight
- Ambulance: South Central
- UK Parliament: Winchester

Wood End is a hamlet in the civil parish of Soberton in the City of Winchester district of Hampshire, England. Its nearest town is Fareham, which lies approximately 4.8 miles (7.7 km) south-east from the village.

The spelling of Woodend is used by the Ordnance Survey and Soberton Parish Council.
