= Temple Valley =

Hamlet in Hampshire, England

Coordinates: 51.059173°N 1.243644°W

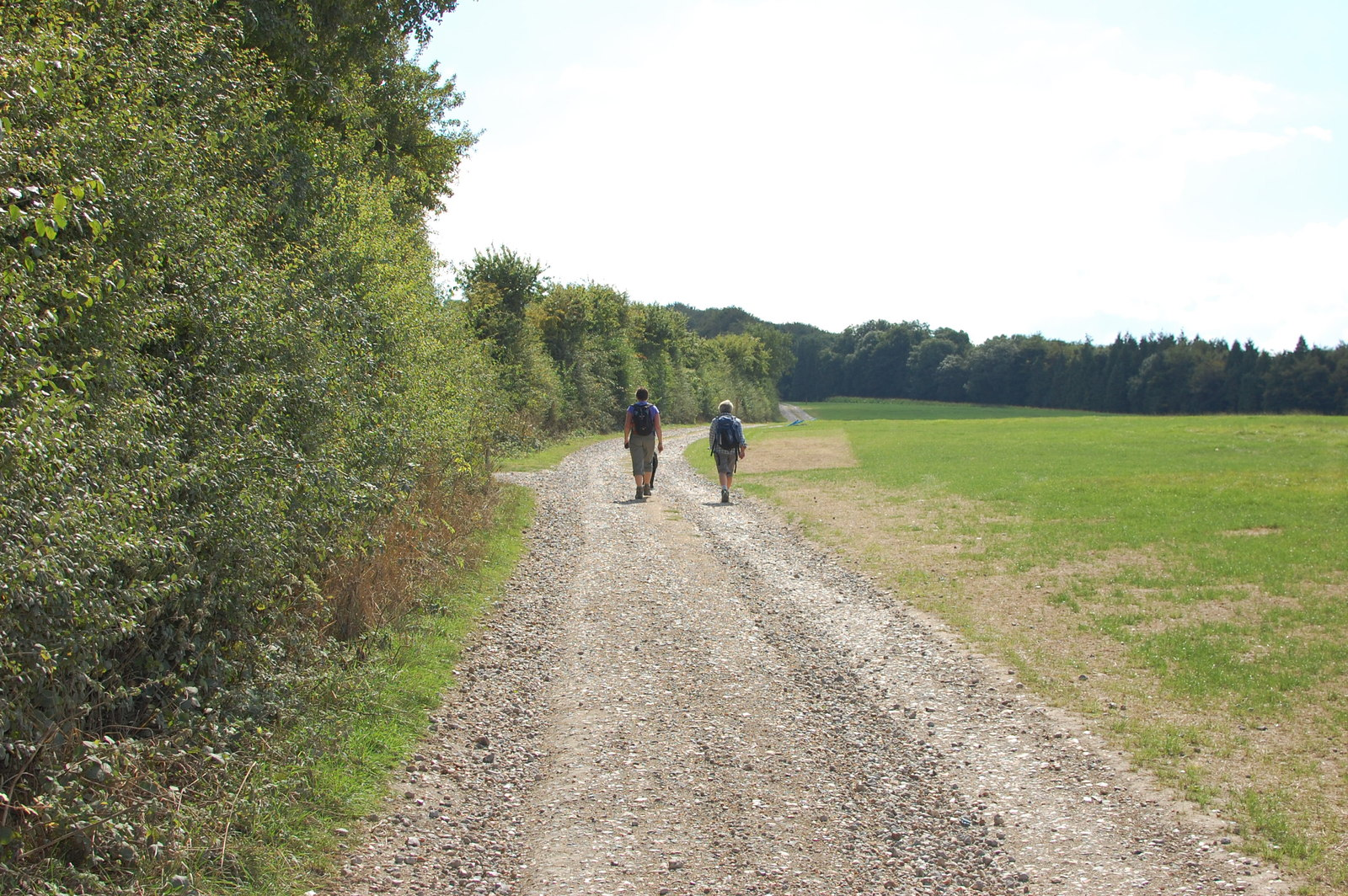
- The South Downs Way at Temple Valley

- Location within Hampshire
- OS grid reference: SU5310329142
- District: Winchester
- Shire county: Hampshire
- Region: South East
- Country: England
- Sovereign state: United Kingdom
- Post town: ALRESFORD
- Postcode district: SO21
- Dialling code: 01962
- Police: Hampshire and Isle of Wight
- Fire: Hampshire and Isle of Wight
- Ambulance: South Central
- UK Parliament: Winchester

Temple Valley is a hamlet in the South Downs in Hampshire, England. The hamlet lies 3.2 miles (5 km) east of Winchester, its county town, on the A31 road. It is in the civil parish of Itchen Valley.
