= South Harewood =

Hamlet in Hampshire, England

Coordinates: 51.176747°N 1.417902°W

- Location within Hampshire
- OS grid reference: SU4078842107
- District: Test Valley
- Shire county: Hampshire
- Region: South East
- Country: England
- Sovereign state: United Kingdom
- Post town: Andover
- Postcode district: SP11 7
- Dialling code: 01264
- Police: Hampshire and Isle of Wight
- Fire: Hampshire and Isle of Wight
- Ambulance: South Central
- UK Parliament: North West Hampshire

South Harewood is a hamlet and civil parish in the Test Valley district of Hampshire, England. At the 2011 Census the population according to the Post Office was included in the civil parish of Wherwell. Its nearest town is Andover, which lies approximately 2.5 miles (5.7 km) north-west from the hamlet.
