= Blounce =

Hamlet in Hampshire, England

Coordinates: 51.221305°N 0.966875°W

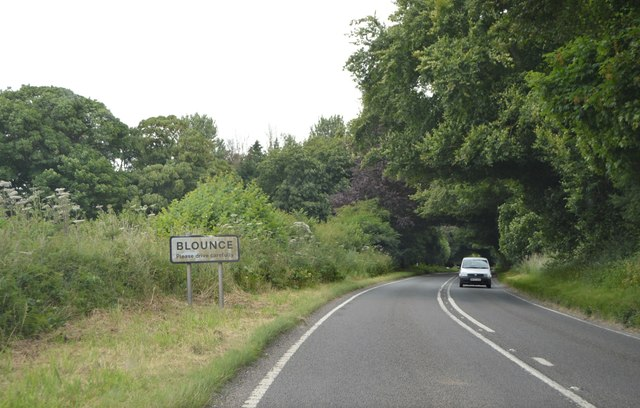
- Entering Blounce

- Location within Hampshire
- Population: 21
- OS grid reference: SU7224647408
- District: Hart
- Shire county: Hampshire
- Region: South East
- Country: England
- Sovereign state: United Kingdom
- Post town: ALTON
- Police: Hampshire and Isle of Wight
- Fire: Hampshire and Isle of Wight
- Ambulance: South Central
- UK Parliament: North East Hampshire

Blounce is a hamlet in the civil parish of South Warnborough in the Hart district of Hampshire, England. It lies on the B3349 road in between Alton and Odiham. The hamlet is only made up of a few cottages and was once a main crossing point between Alton and Odiham.
