= Betty Mundy's Bottom =

Valley in Hampshire, England

Coordinates: 50.99679947°N 1.17394469°W

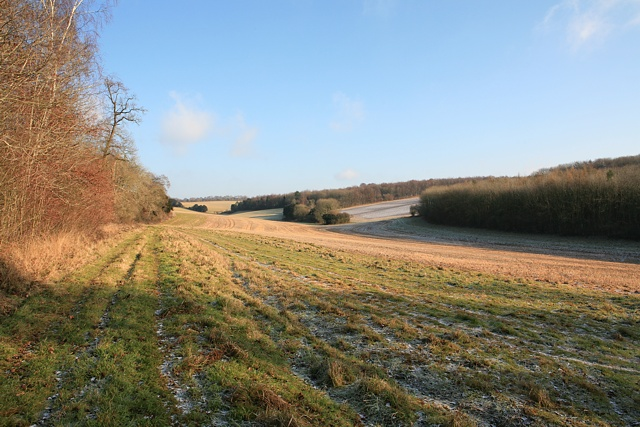
Betty Mundy's Bottom is the valley to the right of the picture

Betty Mundy's Bottom is a wooded valley in the South Downs of Hampshire.

There are various folk tales about the name, dating back centuries. One theory is that it is from the Latin beati mundae, meaning the most beautiful place in the world. Another has it that Betty Mundy lived in a cottage there and that she would waylay discharged sailors walking along the Sailor's Lane, murdering them for their wages or leading them to a press gang. Other stories are that she was a witch or fairy that would curse or trick people.

In 1941, there was building work to renovate two cottages owned by Major Pelly. In 2012, a substantial country house known as Mundy's House was rebuilt there.
