= Ibworth =

Village in Hampshire, England

Coordinates: 51.28°N 01.19°W

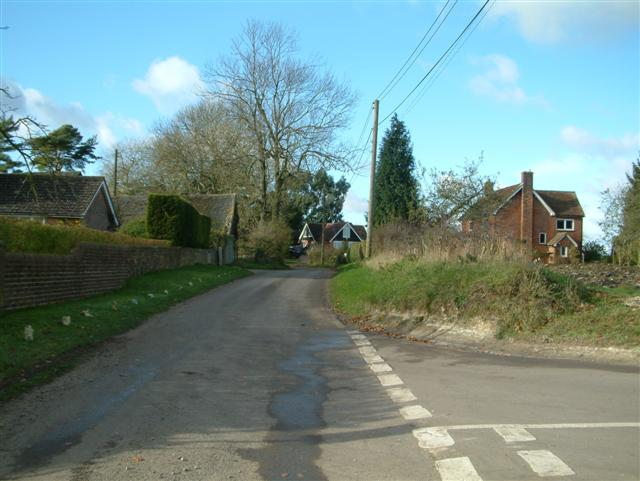

- Location within Hampshire
- OS grid reference: SU5654
- Civil parish: Hannington
- District: Basingstoke and Deane
- Shire county: Hampshire
- Region: South East
- Country: England
- Sovereign state: United Kingdom
- Post town: Tadley
- Postcode district: RG26 5xx
- Police: Hampshire and Isle of Wight
- Fire: Hampshire and Isle of Wight
- Ambulance: South Central
- UK Parliament: North West Hampshire

Ibworth is a hamlet in Hampshire, England. It is in the civil parish of Hannington. Interesting features include a community notice board and a wall post box dating from the reign of Queen Victoria.

== Governance ==
The hamlet of Ibworth is part of the civil parish of Hannington and is part of the Kingsclere ward of Basingstoke and Deane borough council. The borough council is a Non-metropolitan district of Hampshire County Council.
