= Fox Amport =

Village in Hampshire, England

Coordinates: 51.190116°N 1.583844°W

Fox
- Location within Hampshire
- OS grid reference: SU2917943515
- District: Test Valley
- Shire county: Hampshire
- Region: South East
- Country: England
- Sovereign state: United Kingdom
- Post town: ANDOVER
- Postcode district: SP11
- Dialling code: 01264
- Police: Hampshire and Isle of Wight
- Fire: Hampshire and Isle of Wight
- Ambulance: South Central
- UK Parliament: North West Hampshire

Fox is a hamlet in the civil parish of Amport in the Test Valley district of Hampshire, England. Its nearest town is Andover, which lies approximately 4.8 miles (7.7 km) north-east from the hamlet.
