= Whitnal =

Village and parish in Hampshire, England

Coordinates: 51.271730°N 1.301715°W

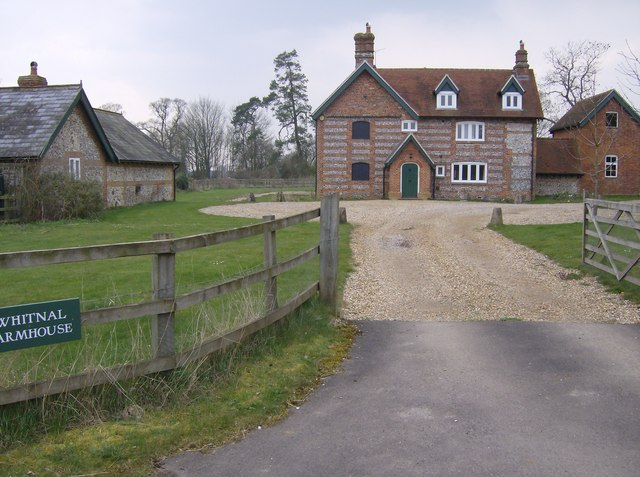
- Whitnal Farm

- Location within Hampshire
- OS grid reference: SU4880952740
- District: Basingstoke and Deane
- Shire county: Hampshire
- Region: South East
- Country: England
- Sovereign state: United Kingdom
- Post town: WHITCHURCH
- Postcode district: RG28 7
- Dialling code: 01256
- Police: Hampshire and Isle of Wight
- Fire: Hampshire and Isle of Wight
- Ambulance: South Central
- UK Parliament: Basingstoke

Whitnal is a hamlet and small civil parish situated in the North Wessex Downs Area of Outstanding Natural Beauty in the Basingstoke and Deane district of Hampshire, England. Its nearest town is Whitchurch, which lies approximately 2.75 miles (4.4 km) south-west from the hamlet.

The hamlet is made up of a handful of cottages and a farmhouse as well as having a grain store. Other towns which are close to Whitnal are Andover and Basingstoke.
