= Forest Corner =

Village in Hampshire, England

Coordinates: 50.8527°N 1.7482°W

- Location within Hampshire
- OS grid reference: SU178059
- District: New Forest
- Shire county: Hampshire
- Region: South East
- Country: England
- Sovereign state: United Kingdom
- Post town: RINGWOOD
- Postcode district: BH24
- Dialling code: 01425
- Police: Hampshire and Isle of Wight
- Fire: Hampshire and Isle of Wight
- Ambulance: South Central
- UK Parliament: New Forest West

Forest Corner is a village in the New Forest National Park of Hampshire, England. It is on the A31 road travelling between Southampton and Bournemouth. Its nearest town is Ringwood, which lies approximately 1.4 miles (2.3 km) to the west.
