= Linbrook Lake =

Lake in Hampshire, England

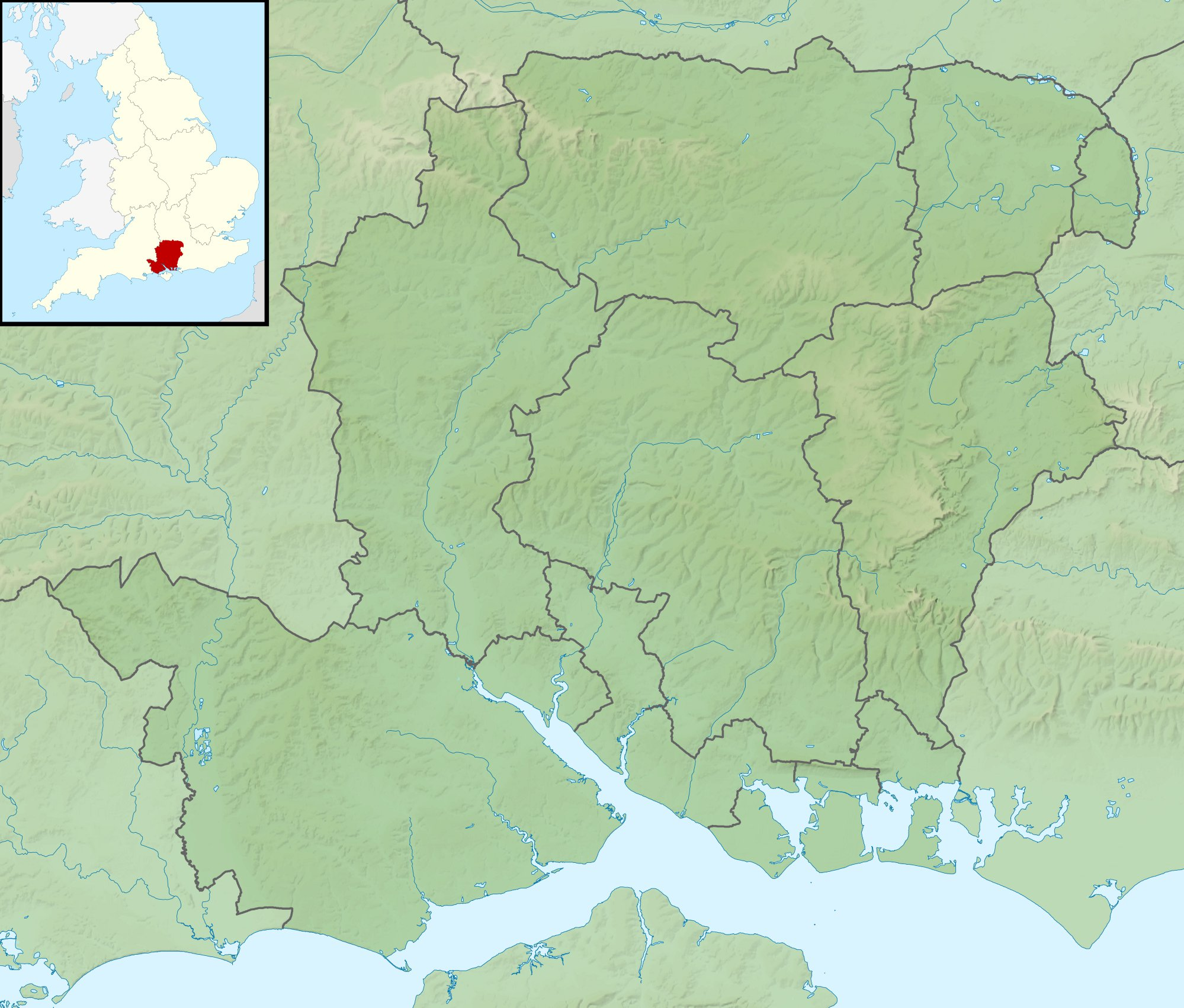
- Location within Hampshire
- Location: Blashford, Hampshire
- Coordinates: 50.8635°N 1.7742°W
- Basin countries: United Kingdom

Linbrook Lake, also called Linbrook East, is a lake located just west of the New Forest National Park in Hampshire, England with the village of Blashford extending further west toward the A338 road. The nearest sizable town to this lake is Ringwood, which lies approximately 1.2 miles (2.3 km) south-west. This area is frequented by bird watchers, and the lake can be viewed from the Avon Valley Path.

The lake is about 20 acres (8.1 ha), with thick weeds and depths up to 12 feet (3.7 m). It is a top tench fishery, and is also known for bream and carp, and occasional rudd.

This lake is adjacent to the Blashford Lakes Nature Reserve.
