= Ladle Hill =

Hill in Hampshire, England

- Site of Special Scientific Interest
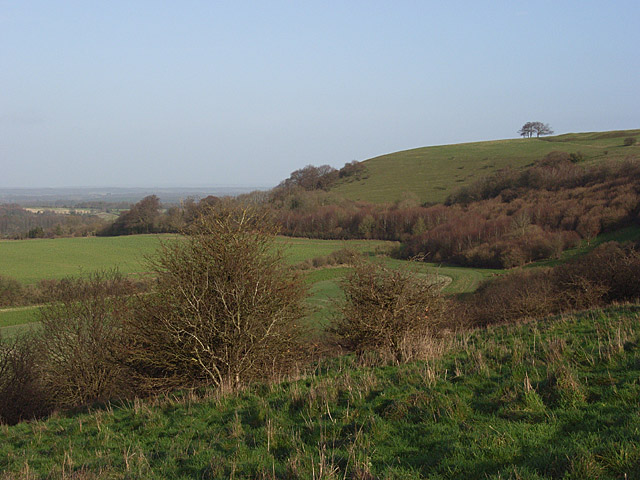
- Looking northeast towards Ladle Hill
- Location of Ladle Hill.
- Area of search: Hampshire
- Grid reference: SU 477 568
- Interest: Biological
- Area: 10.5 hectares (26 acres)
- Notification date: 1984
- Location map: Magic Map

Ladle Hill
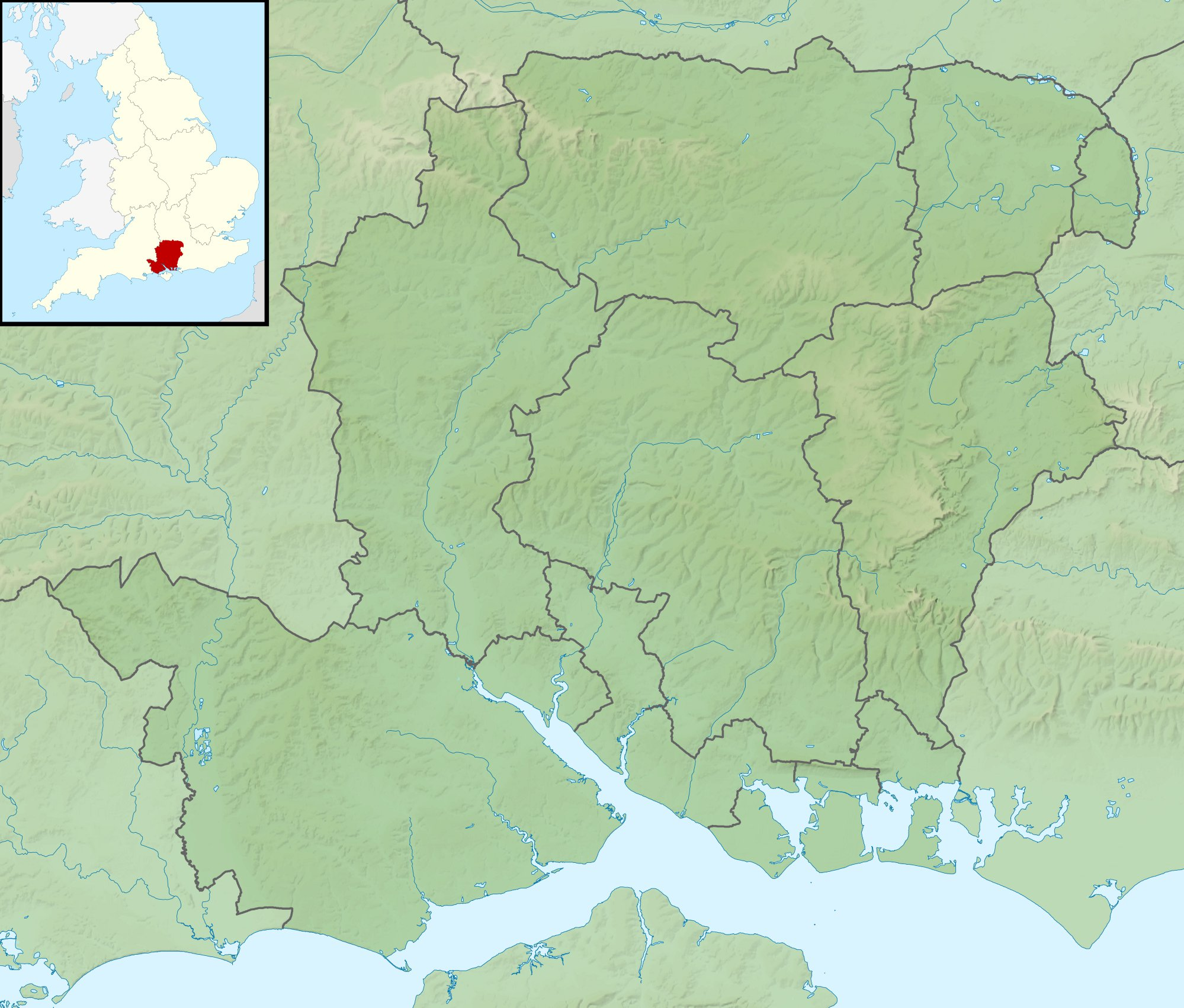
- Location within Hampshire

Highest point
- Elevation: 232 m (761 ft)
- Coordinates: 51°18′31″N 1°18′54″W

Geography
- Location: Hampshire, England
- Topo map: OS Landranger 174

Climbing
- Easiest route: Wayfarer's Walk

Ladle Hill is a 10.5-hectare (26-acre) biological Site of Special Scientific Interest west of Kingsclere in Hampshire. It is also a Scheduled Monument.

== Archaeology ==
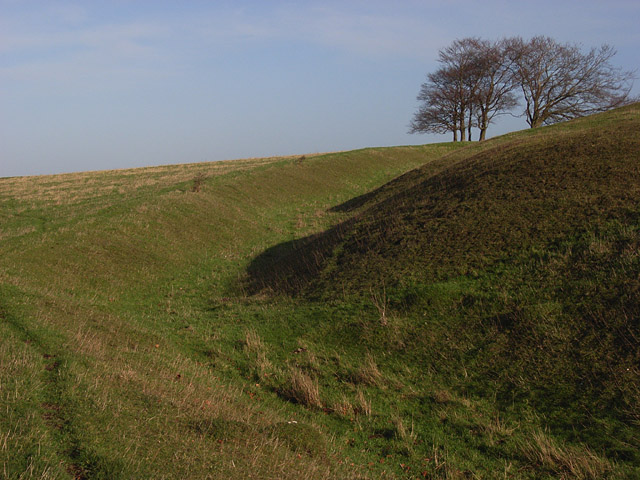
Earthworks at Ladle Hill

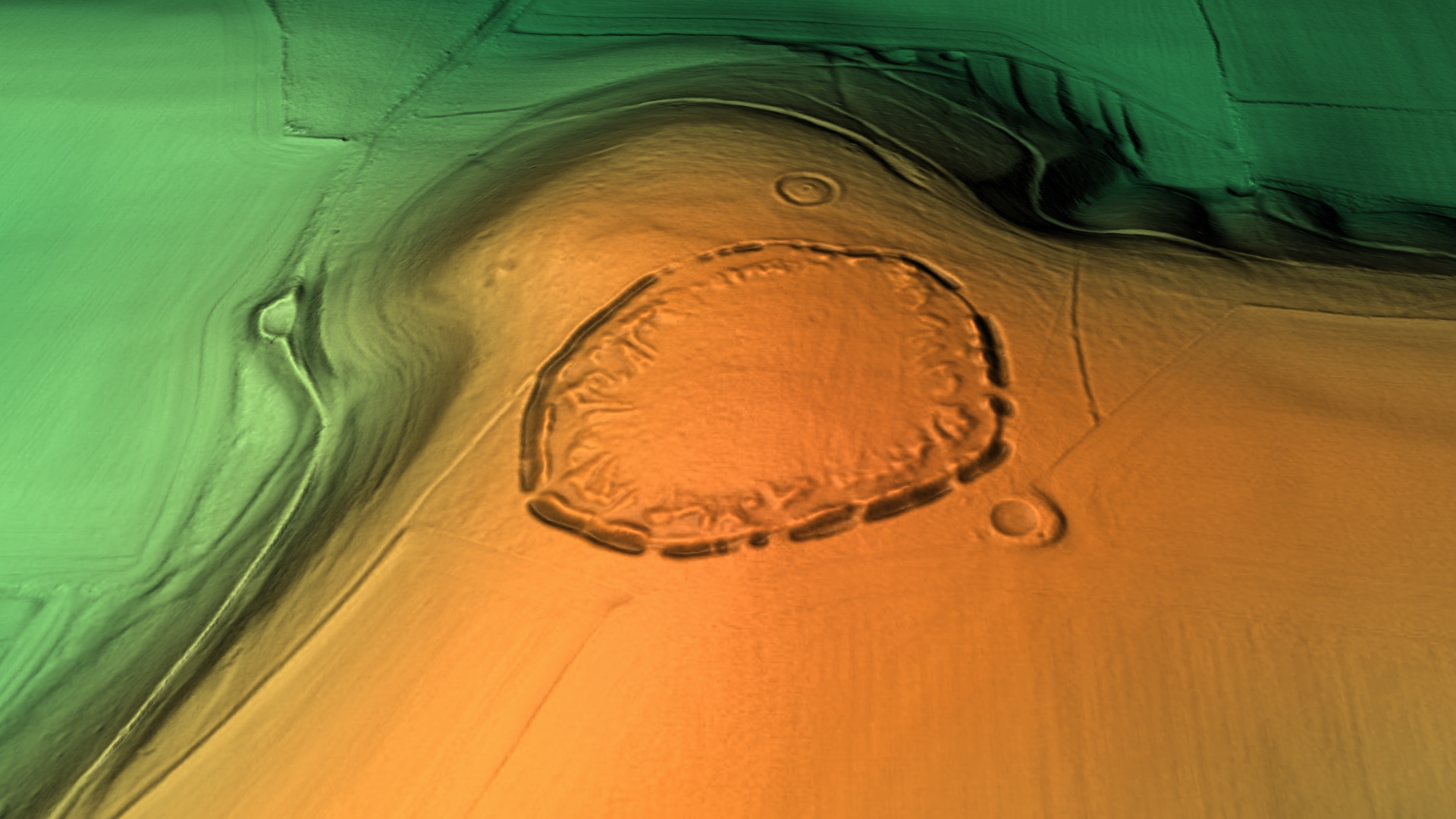
3D view of the digital terrain model

The hillfort on the top of the hill has never been excavated, but the land and ditch are sharply defined and well preserved. This Iron Age fort is roughly rectangular and enclosed seven acres within an embankment and ditch. There are two probable entrances to the east and west. The work seems to have been undertaken by several different labour forces, each working on a section of the defences, but for some reason the task was abandoned and the fort left unfinished. A 170 ft diameter disc barrow lies just to the north (scheduled ancient monument number 43), and there are several other barrows in the area, mostly ploughed-out.

=== The unfinished hillfort ===
Ladle Hill is perhaps the best known of all of the unfinished hillforts in Britain (Feacham 1971). It was first correctly identified as an unfinished hillfort and described in detail by the archaeologist Stuart Piggott in 1931. The site has been invaluable to help archeologists understand the methods employed in the creation of Iron Age date univallate enclosures, with the partially constructed nature of the site revealing features that would normally be concealed in a completed example, such as for possible setting-out ditches, and piles of chalky soil initially quarried from the ditch and deposited in the interior for finishing the rampart.

At Ladle Hill it has long been suspected that the area demarcated by the unfinished earthworks never actually contained a settlement, although there is a possibility that the hillfort was to be constructed over an earlier unenclosed settlement. Magnetometer surveys from 1997 shows none of the variation normally associated with former occupation sites on chalk geology, and this would seem to confirm that a settlement with typical Iron Age characteristics, such as storage pits, was never established within the boundary of the earthwork.

The earthworks were intended to enclose an area of approximately 3.5 ha (8.6 acres) and was marked by a slight ditch, or possibly an earlier palisaded enclosure. Apart from the dumps of material associated with the abandoned construction works, the interior has very few other earthworks of intelligible character.

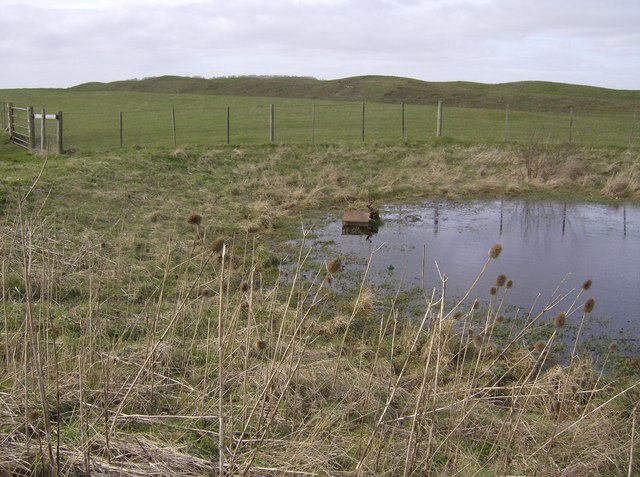
A dewpond on the hill with the hillfort earthworks in the background

=== Surrounding area ===
By contrast the surrounding areas contain a number of features of interest, including a linear ditch that runs along the crest of the west-facing escarpment of Great Litchfield Down and Ladle Hill, and is approximately 2,000 m (2,200 yd) in length. It ends at a slight spur overlooking the valley floor barrow cemetery of Seven Barrows. For a kilometer or so of its visible southern course, this earthwork also forms the western boundary of a large field system on Great Litchfield Down. This field system does not extend northwards as far as Ladle Hill.

Immediately to the east of the unfinished hillfort is another linear ditch, not overlain by the hillfort, which is approximately 700 m (770 yd) in length, finishing at the head of a coombe below Hare Warren Down. To the east of this linear ditch is another large field system, visible both as areas of earthworks and as soil and crop marks on aerial photographs.

To the southwest of Ladle Hill are two sub-square earthwork enclosures, each of approximately 0.3 ha (0.74 acres). Both are undated, but a possible link exists between such enclosures, linear ditches, and areas of probable grazing during the time of the late Bronze Age to early Iron Age transition (Cunliffe 1991, pg386). The features surrounding Ladle Hill are beyond the northern limit of the known field system on Great Litchfield Down and west of the fields on Hare Warren Down and Nuthanger Down. The unfinished hillfort therefore appears to be in an atypical Wessex location, being very close to major linear earthwork features, and in an area without an existing field system.

Immediately to the north of Ladle Hill lies a well preserved disc barrow, some 170 ft (52 m) in diameter. Just beyond this there is evidence for traces of platforms that may represent the remains of an unenclosed settlement (Piggott 1931). This feature has never been surveyed in detail and although an open settlement is possible it may be that these are features of other disturbance such as localized surface quarrying.

Within the northern half of the camp there are traces of a small, low mound, approximately 3 m (9.8 ft) in diameter, thought to be a disc barrow, but magnetometer surveys did not show any trace of a surrounding ditch. The mound today is hardly discernible, but early aerial photographs of the site (circa 1929) show that the mound was better preserved at the time of Piggott's original surveys in the first half of the 20th century.

=== Roman features ===
Sited on the steep west slope of the hill is a Roman earthwork, formed by the erection of a substantial bank on the down hill side of the slope. It may have been a small circus or pond.

== Geology ==
The underlying geology at the site is Cretaceous Upper Chalk, supporting shallow well drained calcareous silty soils over chalk on slopes and crests. Typically these landscapes may be described as 'dramatic', due to their local scale, visual aesthetic and undulating nature. Escarpments are often formed where layers of chalk have been compressed to form a fold, or where the chalk has been faulted, resulting in accelerated erosion along the line of the weakness.

Many chalk grassland slopes in England show the mark of centuries of grazing by sheep, the slopes bearing a stepped or striped appearance formed by a mixture of soil creep and sheep paths. Such erosion is clearly visible on the slopes of Ladle Hill.

== Ecology ==
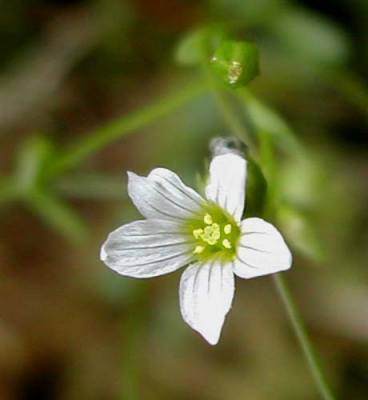
Fairy flax, Liunum catharticum, can be found on Ladle Hill SSSI

The flora and fauna on the hill have been recognised to be of particular importance, and is such that the hill was designated as a biological Site of Special Scientific Interest in 1978. Ladle Hill typifies a calcareous grassland chalk downland habitat now scarce in Britain, and is home to some unusual and rare species. The earthwork in particular is very rich in species, with a good range of downland grasses and large populations of rare and local plants such as field fleawort, Senecio integrifolius; chalk milkwort, Polygala calcarea; hairy rock-cress, Arabis hirsuta; fragrant orchid, Gymnadenia conopsea; and pyramidal orchid, Anacamptis pyramidalis. The earthwork escarpment slopes, though species-rich, support fewer species than within the fort, but some, notably clustered bellflower, Campanula glomerata, only occur there.

The site is also importance for its population of the rare July flowering form of the burnt-tip orchid, Orchis ustulata. This form is morphologically distinct, has a peculiar flowering period, and survives now only on a few sites in Britain.

The hill also supports salad burnet, thyme, fairy flax and hairy violet. There is some scattered scrub on the north-facing slope but there does not appear to be on-going encroachment.

== Location ==
The site is located at grid reference SU478568, on Great Litchfield Down, to the southeast of the village of Old Burghclere, in the county of Hampshire. The hill has a summit of 232 m (761 ft) AOD just within the civil parish of Litchfield and Woodcott, with the hill also falling within the two other civil parishes of Burghclere, and Ecchinswell, Sydmonton and Bishops Green. Nearby to the west lies Beacon Hill and to the immediate east is Watership Down. Also to the north east lies Old Burghclere Lime Quarry SSSI. The A34 runs between the Ladle Hill and Beacon Hill to the east. The site and surrounding downs are easily accessible by public footpath, including the nearby cross county footpath, Wayfarer's Walk.
