= Middle Wyke =

Hamlet in Hampshire, England

Coordinates: 51.2414°N 1.4180°W

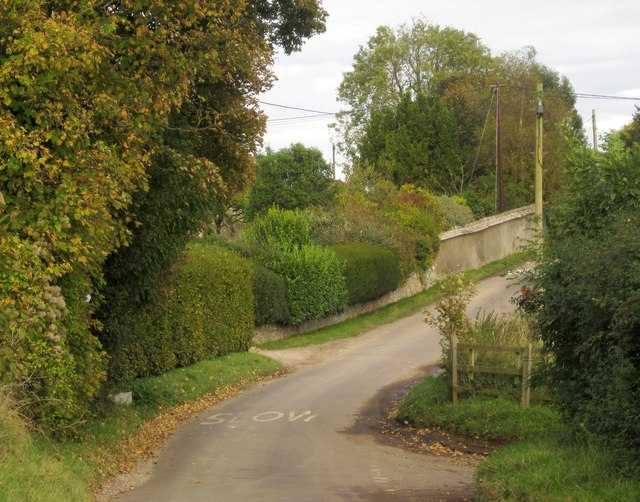
- Portway at Middle Wyke

- Location within Hampshire
- OS grid reference: SU4072249301
- Civil parish: St Mary Bourne
- District: Basingstoke and Deane
- Shire county: Hampshire
- Region: South East
- Country: England
- Sovereign state: United Kingdom
- Post town: ANDOVER
- Postcode district: SP11
- Dialling code: 01264
- Police: Hampshire and Isle of Wight
- Fire: Hampshire and Isle of Wight
- Ambulance: South Central
- UK Parliament: Basingstoke

Middle Wyke is a hamlet in the Basingstoke and Deane district of Hampshire, England. Its nearest town is Andover, which lies approximately 3.7 miles (6.1 km) south-west from the hamlet.

== Governance ==
The hamlet is part of the civil parish of St Mary Bourne and is part of the Burghclere, Highclere and St Mary Bourne ward of Basingstoke and Deane borough council. The borough council is a Non-metropolitan district of Hampshire County Council.
