= Watership Down, Hampshire =

Hillside in Hampshire, England, United Kingdom

Coordinates: 51.310°N 1.288°W

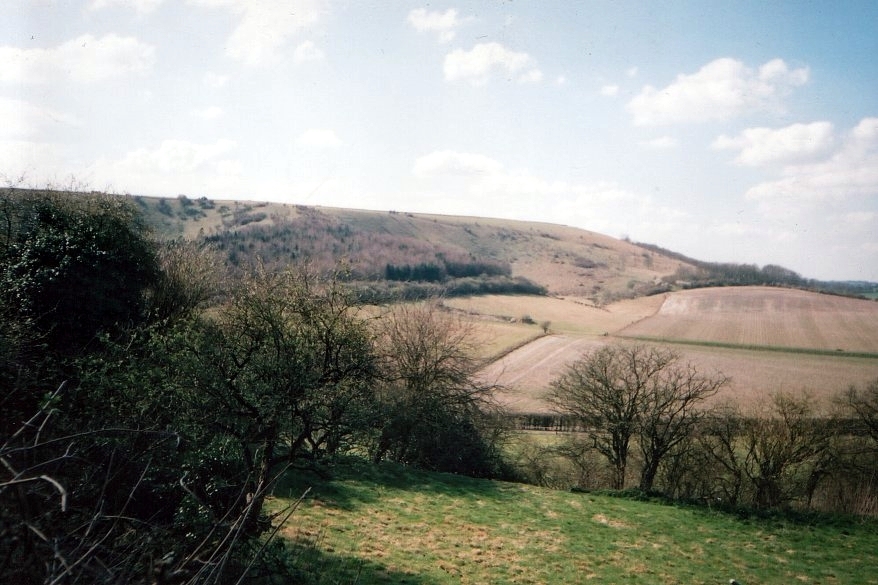
Watership Down, seen from the northeast

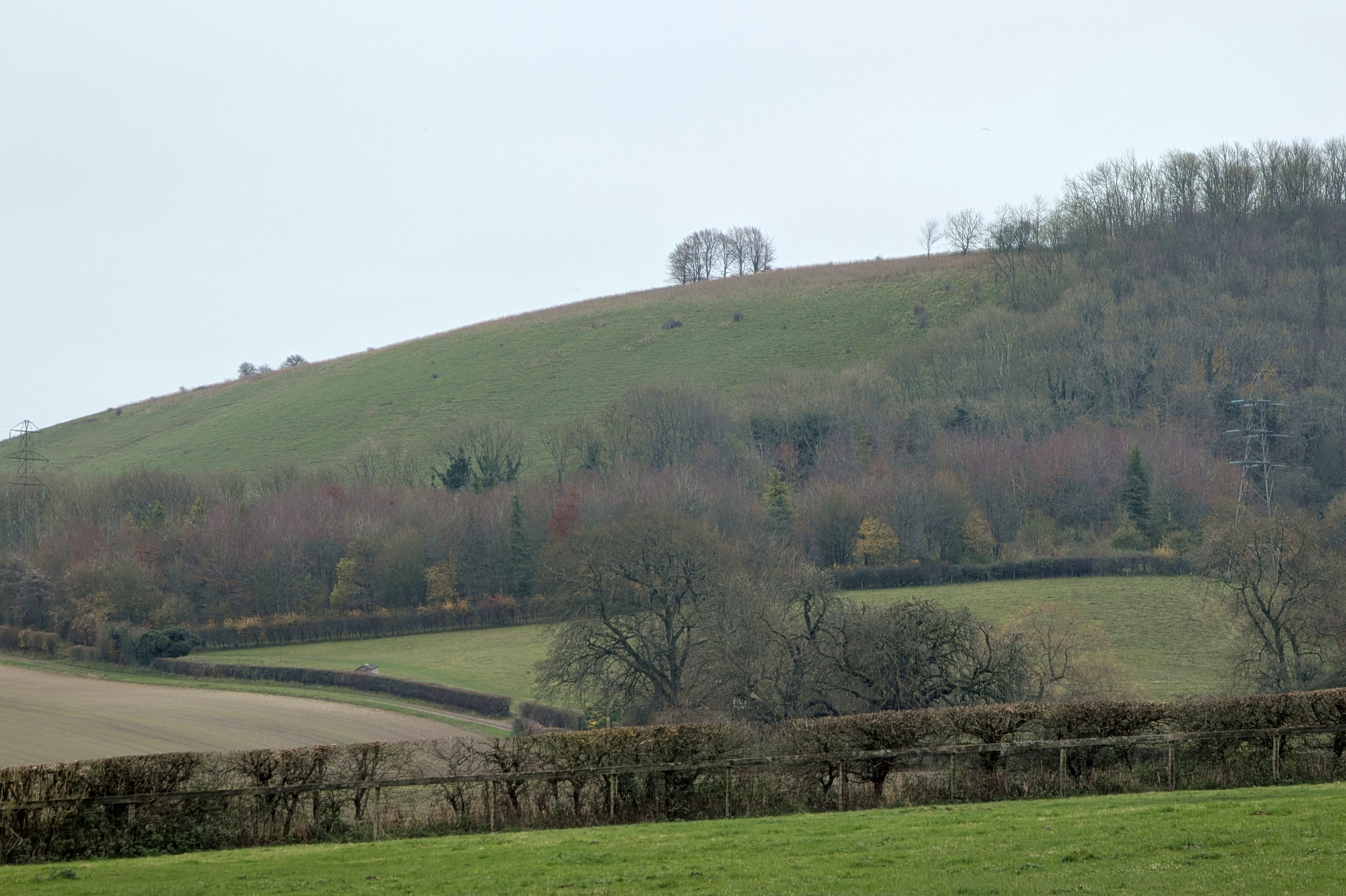
Watership Down, seen from the northwest

Watership Down is a down or hill in the civil parish of Ecchinswell, Sydmonton and Bishops Green in the English county of Hampshire. It forms part of the Hampshire Downs. It rises fairly steeply on its northern flank (the scarp side), but to the south the slope is much gentler (the dip side). The summit is 778 ft (237 m) above sea level, making it one of the highest points in Hampshire. The down's name derives from the farm of Watership, which lies north of Sydmonton. The etymon is Old English wætersċipe, meaning "conduit" or "artificial watercourse".

The down is best known as the setting of Richard Adams's 1972 novel about rabbits, also called Watership Down. Atop Watership Down, which is exposed and windswept, there is a beech tree planted in memory of Richard Adams.

The area is popular with cyclists and walkers. A bridleway, the Wayfarer's Walk cross-county footpath, runs along the ridge of the down, which lies at the south-eastern edge of the North Wessex Downs Area of Natural Beauty. Other nearby features include Ladle Hill, on Great Litchfield Down, immediately to the west. Part of the hill is a 10.37-hectare (25.6-acre) biological Site of Special Scientific Interest, first designated in 1978. The hill has a partially completed Iron Age hill fort on its summit, and the surrounding area is rich in Iron Age tumuli, enclosures, lynchets and field systems. Further to the west lies Beacon Hill. Watership Down is accessible via the large village of Kingsclere.

Watership Down Stud is a horse-breeding establishment owned by Andrew Lloyd Webber and his wife Madeleine Gurdon, a former eventer, who live nearby at Sydmonton Court.
