= King Alfred's Way =

Cycling route in Winchester, Hampshire, England

King Alfred's Way is a 350 km predominantly off-road cycling route that officially starts at the historic Westgate, at one end of the High Street in Winchester, and finishes at the other end, under the statue of King Alfred. The route was created by the charity Cycling UK. The charity spent three years working on the route which connects four of England's National Trails: North Downs Way, South Downs Way, The Ridgeway, and Thames Path. Creating the route involved working with councils and landowners to upgrade footpaths to bridleways.
