= Moundsmere =

Hamlet in Hampshire, England

Coordinates: 51.182808°N 1.099470°W

- Location within Hampshire
- OS grid reference: SU6303943005
- District: Basingstoke and Deane
- Shire county: Hampshire
- Region: South East
- Country: England
- Sovereign state: United Kingdom
- Post town: Basingstoke
- Postcode district: RG25 2
- Dialling code: 01256
- Police: Hampshire and Isle of Wight
- Fire: Hampshire and Isle of Wight
- Ambulance: South Central
- UK Parliament: Basingstoke

Moundsmere is a hamlet in Hampshire, England. It is in the civil parish of Preston Candover. It is 3 miles away from the village of Bentworth and lies 6.2 miles (10.0 km) away from Basingstoke.

At one time, Moundsmere came under the large parish of Bentworth until its decline in the mid-19th century. Although today, Moundsmere still borders the parish of Bentworth.

== History ==
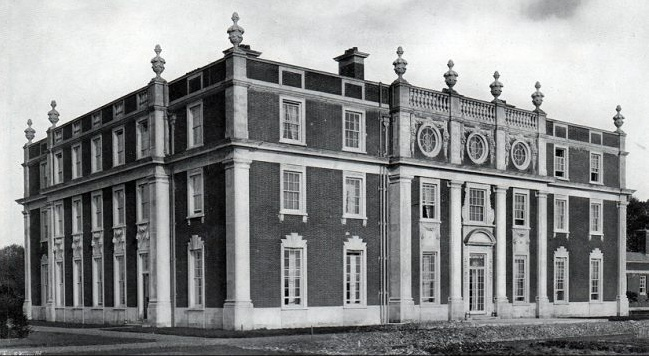
Moundsmere Manor (1910)

Moundsmere became part of the dower first of Anne of Cleves and then of Catherine Howard. On the death of Catherine Howard, Henry VIII granted it to Winchester College in part exchange for certain other manors. The college used a manor in Moundsmere as a site of retreat from epidemics. The current Moundsmere Manor was built in 1908-9 by Sir Reginald Blomfield for Wilfred Buckley, a highly successful businessman returning to England from America, on the site he identified following a lengthy search for the perfect position.
