= Fobdown =

Hamlet in Hampshire, England

Coordinates: 51.101390°N 1.18544°W

- Location within Hampshire
- OS grid reference: SU5713033881
- District: Winchester
- Shire county: Hampshire
- Region: South East
- Country: England
- Sovereign state: United Kingdom
- Post town: ALRESFORD
- Postcode district: SO24
- Dialling code: 01962
- Police: Hampshire and Isle of Wight
- Fire: Hampshire and Isle of Wight
- Ambulance: South Central
- UK Parliament: Winchester

Fobdown is a hamlet in Hampshire, England. It lies 2 miles (3.2 km) north-west from New Alresford. It is in the civil parish of Old Alresford.
