= Wells-in-the-Field =

Hamlet in Hampshire, England

Coordinates: 51.234910°N 1.314456°W

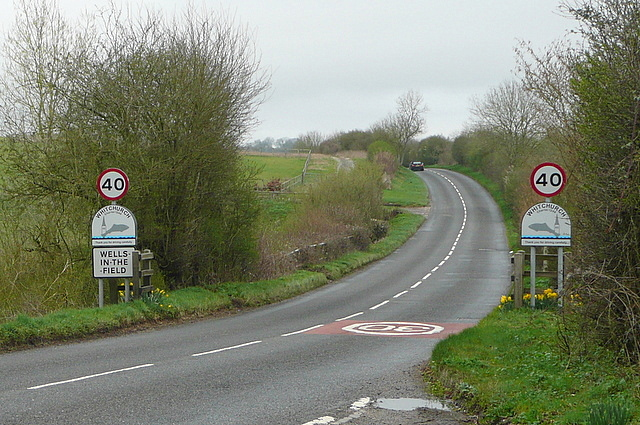
- Entering Wells-in-the-Field

- Location within Hampshire
- OS grid reference: SU4795948637
- Civil parish: Laverstoke
- District: Basingstoke and Deane
- Shire county: Hampshire
- Region: South East
- Country: England
- Sovereign state: United Kingdom
- Post town: WHITCHURCH
- Postcode district: RG28 7
- Police: Hampshire and Isle of Wight
- Fire: Hampshire and Isle of Wight
- Ambulance: South Central
- UK Parliament: North West Hampshire

Wells-in-the-Field is a hamlet in the civil parish of Laverstoke situated in the North Wessex Downs Area of Outstanding Natural Beauty in the Basingstoke and Deane district of Hampshire, England. Its nearest town is Whitchurch, which lies approximately 1.2 miles (1.9 km) south-west from the hamlet.
