= Twyford Moors =

Hamlet in Hampshire, England

Coordinates: 51°00′13″N 1°19′16″W

- Location within Hampshire
- OS grid reference: SU4773222921
- District: Winchester
- Shire county: Hampshire
- Region: South East
- Country: England
- Sovereign state: United Kingdom
- Post town: WINCHESTER
- Postcode district: SO21 1
- Dialling code: 01962
- Police: Hampshire and Isle of Wight
- Fire: Hampshire and Isle of Wight
- Ambulance: South Central
- UK Parliament: Winchester

Twyford Moors is a hamlet in the civil parish of Colden Common in the City of Winchester district of Hampshire, England. It is 1 1/4 miles (2.0 km) south of Twyford and its nearest town is Winchester, which lies approximately 4 miles (6.4 km) north from the hamlet.
