= Purbrook Heath =

Hamlet in Hampshire, England

Coordinates: 50.870010°N 1.066629°W

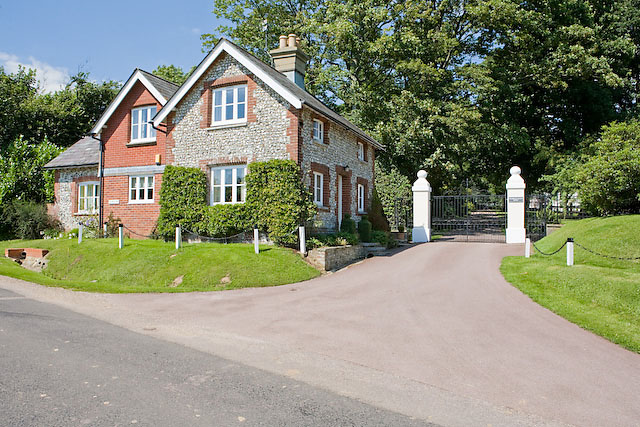
- Gate to Purbrook Heath House

- Location within Hampshire
- OS grid reference: SU6577508249
- Civil parish: Purbrook
- District: Havant
- Shire county: Hampshire
- Region: South East
- Country: England
- Sovereign state: United Kingdom
- Post town: WATERLOOVILLE
- Postcode district: PO7
- Dialling code: 023
- Police: Hampshire and Isle of Wight
- Fire: Hampshire and Isle of Wight
- Ambulance: South Central
- UK Parliament: Havant

Purbrook Heath is a hamlet in the civil parish of Purbrook in the Havant district of Hampshire, England. Its nearest town is Waterlooville, which lies approximately 1.5 miles (2.6 km) north-east from hamlet.

The Heath includes many attractions such as the cage where the locals can play football or basketball. There is also a cricket pitch, tennis courts and woodlands that has become popular for both dog walkers and the homeless.

Two large Regency-period properties are located in Purbrook Heath; Purbrook Heath House and Broomfield House, both of which were historically part of the larger Southwick Estate and were commandeered during 'Operation Overlord' in the run-up to the D-Day landings. Purbrook Heath House hosted an US signals regiment, whilst Broomfield House was where Field Marshal Montgomery was billeted.

In the nearby village of Southwick, a pub named the Golden Lion, is famously where Montgomery and Dwight D Einsenhower met and planned for the D Day effort.

Purbrook Heath Road is said to be of Roman origin, and would once have linked up to Venta Belgarvm (modern-day Winchester). Today, the road connects with the old A3 London Road, which was used by the troops returning from the battle of Waterloo (1815). Tributaries of the river Meon used to run alongside this road and troop encampments along it are said to have led to the foundation of Waterlooville, its central pub being named 'The Heroes' in honour of the returning victors. Though many of the streams have silted up or been constructed over, some still exist and a small brook traces its way along the Eastern part of Purbrook Heath Road.
