= Ashe Warren =

Village in Hampshire, England

Coordinates: 51.2628°N 1.2308°W

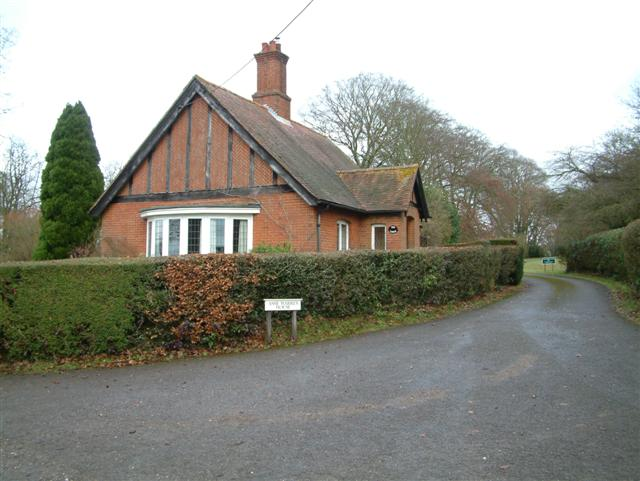
- Ashe Warren Lodge

- Location within Hampshire
- OS grid reference: SU537517
- Civil parish: Overton
- District: Basingstoke and Deane
- Shire county: Hampshire
- Region: South East
- Country: England
- Sovereign state: United Kingdom
- Post town: BASINGSTOKE
- Postcode district: RG25
- Dialling code: 01256
- Police: Hampshire and Isle of Wight
- Fire: Hampshire and Isle of Wight
- Ambulance: South Central
- UK Parliament: Basingstoke

Ashe Warren is a village in the Basingstoke and Deane district of Hampshire, England. The settlement is within the civil parish of Overton, and is located approximately 6.3 miles (10.1 km) west of Basingstoke.

== Governance ==
The village is part of the civil parish of Overton, and is part of the Overton, Laverstoke and Steventon ward of Basingstoke and Deane borough council. The borough council is a non-metropolitan district of Hampshire County Council.
