= Newfound, Hampshire =

Hamlet in Hampshire, England

Coordinates: 51.258735°N 1.167300°W

Newfound
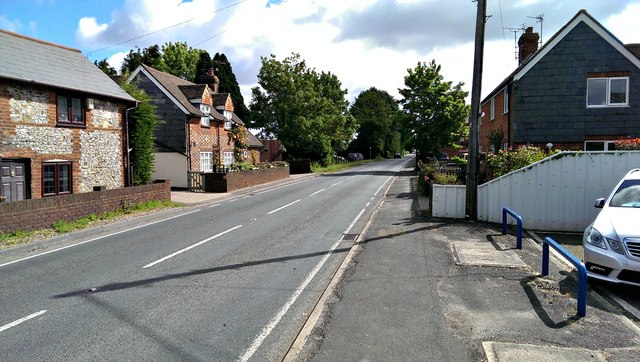
- Along the B3400

- Location within Hampshire
- OS grid reference: SU5820251393
- Civil parish: Oakley
- District: Basingstoke and Deane
- Shire county: Hampshire
- Region: South East
- Country: England
- Sovereign state: United Kingdom
- Post town: BASINGSTOKE
- Postcode district: RG23
- Dialling code: 01256
- Police: Hampshire and Isle of Wight
- Fire: Hampshire and Isle of Wight
- Ambulance: South Central
- UK Parliament: Basingstoke

Newfound is a hamlet in the Basingstoke and Deane district of Hampshire, England. Its nearest town is Basingstoke, which lies approximately 4.1 miles (6.6 km) east from the hamlet.

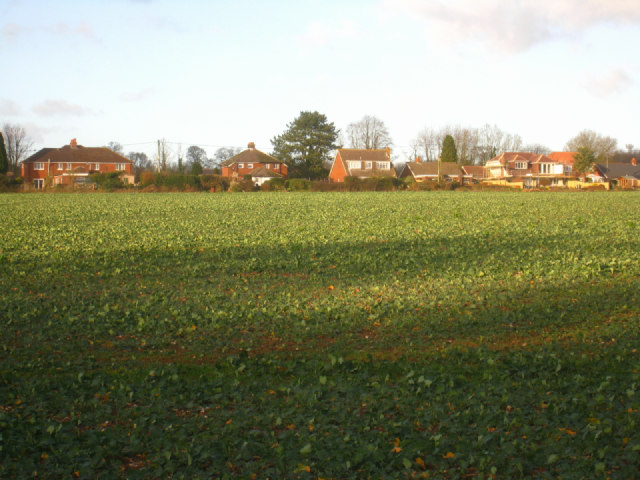
From Fox Lane Field

== Governance ==
The hamlet is part of the civil parish of Oakley, and is part of the Oakley and North Waltham ward of Basingstoke and Deane borough council. The borough council is a Non-metropolitan district of Hampshire County Council.
