= Bagnum =

Hamlet in Hampshire, England

Coordinates: 50.823570°N 1.755236°W

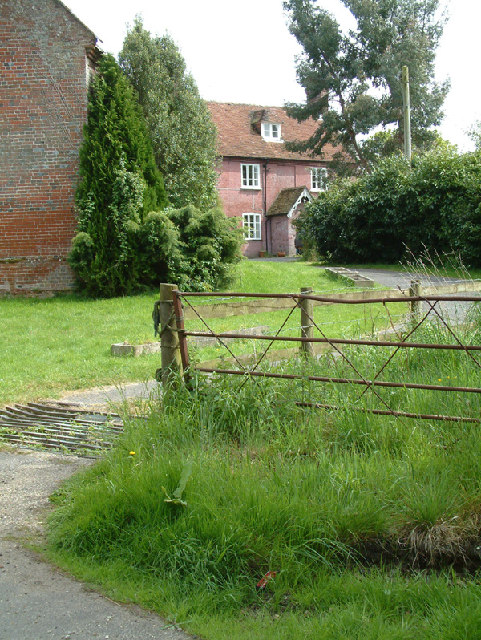
- Bagnum Farm

- Location within Hampshire
- OS grid reference: SU173027
- District: New Forest
- Shire county: Hampshire
- Region: South East
- Country: England
- Sovereign state: United Kingdom
- Post town: RINGWOOD
- Postcode district: BH24
- Dialling code: 01425
- Police: Hampshire and Isle of Wight
- Fire: Hampshire and Isle of Wight
- Ambulance: South Central
- UK Parliament: New Forest West

Bagnum is a hamlet in the English county of Hampshire. The settlement is within the civil parish of Ringwood (where the 2011 Census was included), and is located approximately 2.2 miles (3.5 km) south-east of Ringwood town centre.

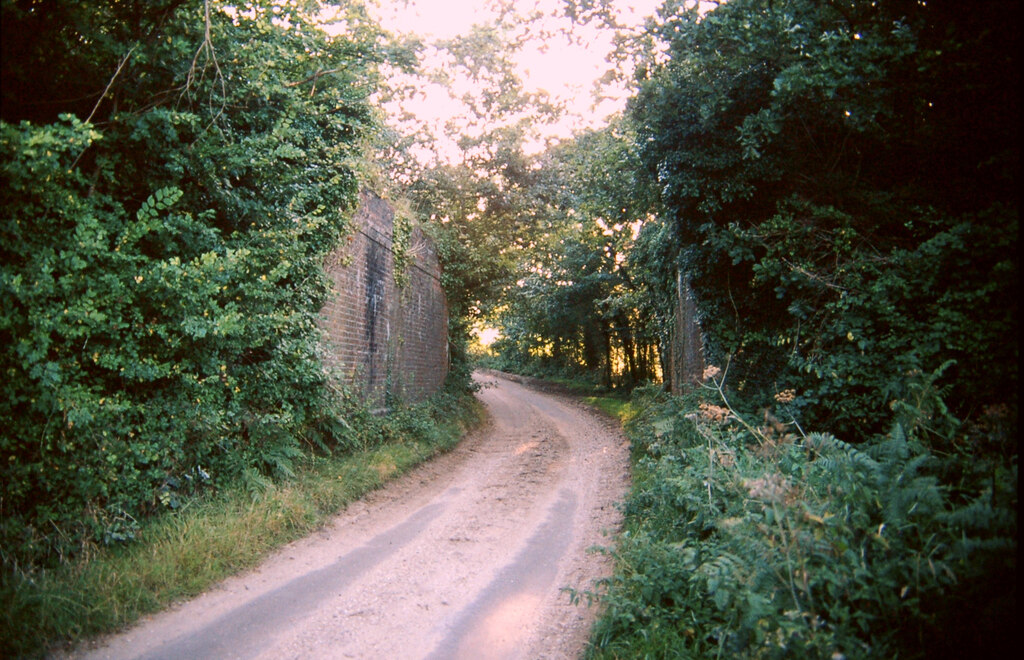
Old railway bridge
