= South Hampshire Coast =

Protected area in England (until 2005)

Coordinates: 50°46′N 1°28′W

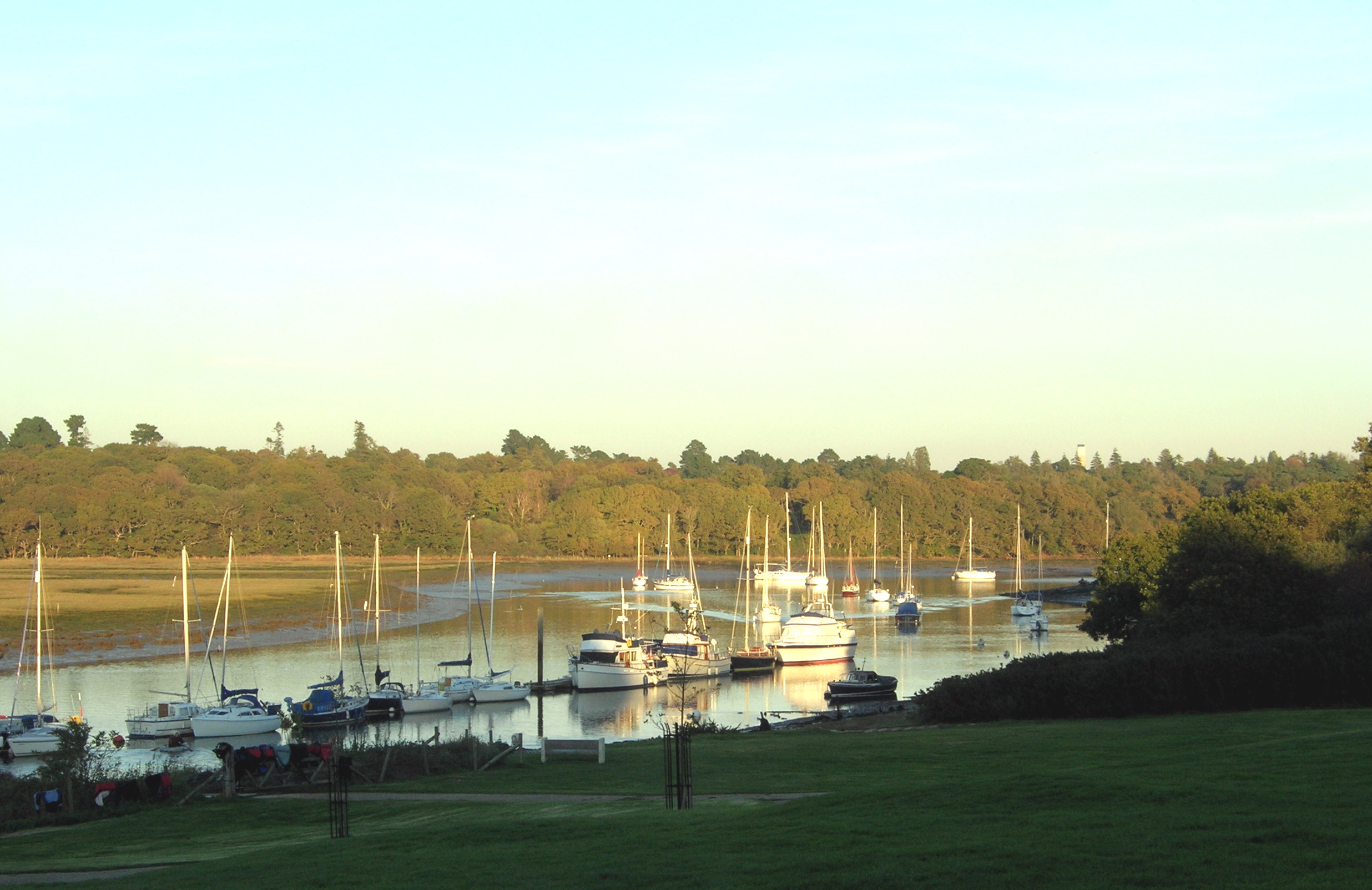
- Beaulieu River in the South Hampshire Coast AONB
- Interactive map of South Hampshire Coast
- Location: Hampshire, England

The South Hampshire Coast was an Area of Outstanding Natural Beauty (AONB) in Hampshire, England, UK that was subsumed into the New Forest National Park when it was established on 1 April 2005. It lies between the New Forest and the west shore of the Solent.

It includes freshwater lagoons, salt-marsh, shingle, tidal mudflats, wooded coastal lowlands and the estuaries of the Beaulieu and Lymington rivers.

The entire length of the AONB's coast is covered by Sites of Special Scientific Interest and the estuaries in particular are notable for wildlife. Places of interest include Buckler's Hard.
