= Rye, Hampshire =

Hamlet in Hampshire, England

Coordinates: 51.246686°N 0.897295°W

Rye
- Location within Hampshire
- OS grid reference: SU7706350301
- District: Hart
- Shire county: Hampshire
- Region: South East
- Country: England
- Sovereign state: United Kingdom
- Post town: ODIHAM
- Postcode district: GU10
- Police: Hampshire and Isle of Wight
- Fire: Hampshire and Isle of Wight
- Ambulance: South Central
- UK Parliament: North East Hampshire

Rye is a hamlet in the civil parish of Odiham, in the Hart district of Hampshire, England. The hamlet lies near the A287 road between Odiham and Farnham. The hamlet is made up of a large farm and a common. Its nearest town is Hook approximately four miles (six kilometres) away although it lies two miles (three kilometres) closer to Odiham.
