= Knightwood =

Village in Hampshire, England

Coordinates: 50.98470°N 1.39906°W

- Village
- Location within Hampshire
- OS grid reference: SU422207
  - London: 65.6 mi (105.6 km) NE
- District: Eastleigh
- Shire county: Hampshire
- Region: South East
- Country: England
- Sovereign state: United Kingdom
- Post town: EASTLEIGH
- Postcode district: SO53
- Dialling code: 023
- Police: Hampshire and Isle of Wight
- Fire: Hampshire and Isle of Wight
- Ambulance: South Central

Knightwood is a small village in Chandler's Ford which is in Hampshire, England. It is in the civil parish of Valley Park. It is roughly 6 miles north of Southampton.
