= Crockerhill, Hampshire =

Hamlet in Hampshire, England

Coordinates: 50°52′54″N 1°11′00″W

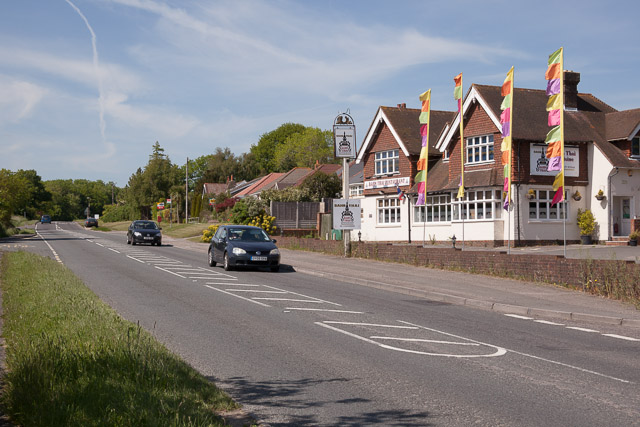
Wickham Road, Crockerhill

Crockerhill is a hamlet in south Hampshire, England. The population at the 2011 Census was included in the Borough of Fareham
