= North Boarhunt =

Village in Hampshire, England

Coordinates: 50.887940°N 1.142705°W

- Location within Hampshire
- OS grid reference: SU6039910178
- District: Winchester
- Shire county: Hampshire
- Region: South East
- Country: England
- Sovereign state: United Kingdom
- Post town: FAREHAM
- Postcode district: PO17
- Police: Hampshire and Isle of Wight
- Fire: Hampshire and Isle of Wight
- Ambulance: South Central
- UK Parliament: Winchester

North Boarhunt is a village just outside of Portsmouth in the district of Hampshire, England. It is in the civil parish of Boarhunt.
