= Monxton =

Village and parish in Hampshire, England

Coordinates: 51°11′52″N 1°33′11″W

Monxton Upon Anton
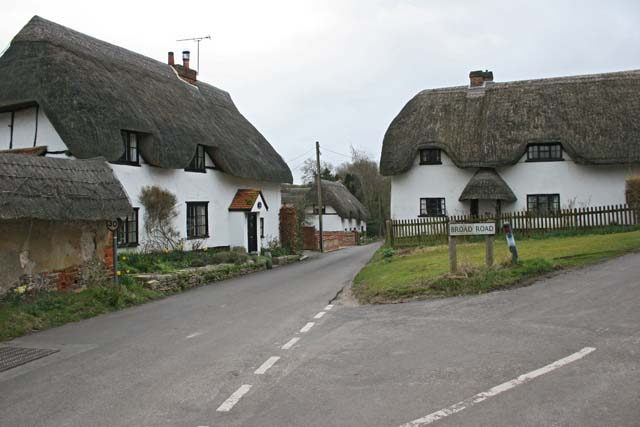

- Location within Hampshire
- Population: 277 (2011 Census)
- OS grid reference: SU3142644439
- District: Test Valley
- Shire county: Hampshire
- Region: South East
- Country: England
- Sovereign state: United Kingdom
- Post town: ANDOVER
- Postcode district: SP11
- Dialling code: 01264
- Police: Hampshire and Isle of Wight
- Fire: Hampshire and Isle of Wight
- Ambulance: South Central
- UK Parliament: North West Hampshire

Monxton is a village and civil parish in Hampshire, England. It lies 3 miles west of Andover near the A303 road. It had one pub, named the Black Swan, which is now permanently closed.
