= Ecchinswell, Sydmonton and Bishops Green =

Civil parish in Hampshire, England

Coordinates: 51.3462°N 1.2740°W

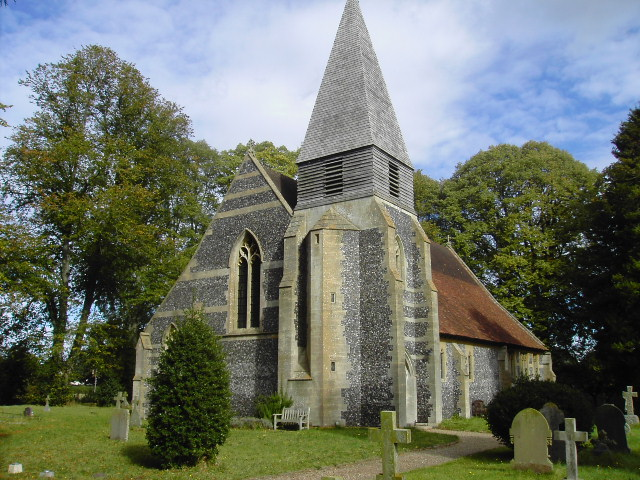
- Ecchinswell Church

- Location within Hampshire
- Population: 1,182 (2001 census); 1,048 (2011 Census including Hare Warren and North Sydmonton)
- OS grid reference: SU505614
- District: Basingstoke and Deane
- Shire county: Hampshire
- Region: South East
- Country: England
- Sovereign state: United Kingdom
- Post town: NEWBURY
- Postcode district: RG20
- Dialling code: 01635
- UK Parliament: Newbury
- Website: http://www.ecchinswell-pc.gov.uk/

Ecchinswell, Sydmonton and Bishops Green (occasionally referred to as just Ecchinswell and Sydmonton) is a civil parish within the district of Basingstoke and Deane in Hampshire, England. In 2011 the parish had a population of 1,048.

Sydmonton is the home of Sydmonton Court, estate of the Kingsmill Family, including Admiral Sir Robert Kingsmill. The estate is currently owned by Andrew Lloyd Webber and is home to the annual Sydmonton Festival.

== Geography ==
Watership Down, location of the famous Richard Adams novel of the same name, is just South of Ecchinswell. Ladle Hill on Great Litchfield Down, also lies to the south. Part of the hill is a 10.37 hectares (25.6 acres) biological SSSI, first notified in 1978. The hill has a partially completed Iron Age hill fort on its summit, and the surrounding area is rich in Iron Age tumuli, enclosures, lynchets and field systems. Ladle Hill and Watership Down are easily accessed from the Wayfarer's Walk cross-county footpath that passes through the parish.

== See also ==
- Ecchinswell
- Sydmonton
- Sydmonton Festival
- Bishop's Green
