= Burghclere =

Village and civil parish in Hampshire, England

Coordinates: 51°19′N 1°19′W

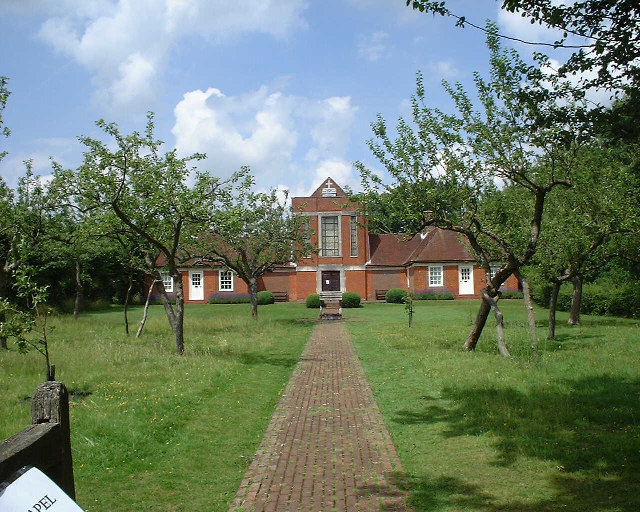
- Sandham Memorial Chapel, Burghclere
- Population: 1,152 (2011 Census)
- District: Basingstoke and Deane
- Shire county: Hampshire
- Region: South East
- Country: England
- Sovereign state: United Kingdom
- Post town: Newbury
- Postcode district: RG20
- Dialling code: 01635
- Police: Hampshire and Isle of Wight
- Fire: Hampshire and Isle of Wight
- Ambulance: South Central
- UK Parliament: North West Hampshire

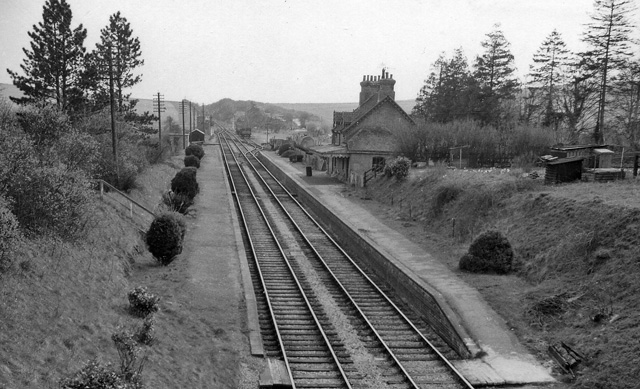
Remains of Burghclere railway station in 1963

Burghclere is a village and civil parish in Hampshire, England. According to the 2011 census the village had a population of 1,152. The village is near the border of Hampshire with Berkshire, four miles south of Newbury. The closest settlements are Newtown, Old Burghclere and Newtown Common.

Work by the 20th-century artist Stanley Spencer can be found in the Sandham Memorial Chapel. The Church of the Ascension is on Church Lane in Burghclere.

== Community ==
There are community clubs such as Stagecoach Newbury which is held at The Clere School, and there is a Sports and Social club. There are allotments, and a small memorial garden. In addition, there is a large playing field.

== Transport ==
The nearest railway station is Newbury. Burghclere had its own station on the Didcot, Newbury and Southampton Railway but the station closed in 1960. Limited bus services to Newbury are provided by Stagecoach via route 32 (as of April 2026).However, this requires a walk of about 40 minutes.

== Education ==
Burghclere has three schools, the Clere School which is a secondary school, Burghclere Primary School and the independent St. Michael's School, run by the traditionalist Catholic Society of St Pius X, which accepts both boarding and day pupils.

== Rural scenery ==
Burghclere has rural scenery for walking and hiking, including an old railway. When it snows, people gather for snowballing or sledging at Beacon Hill and Jacob's Ladder.

== Literature ==
The rabbit warren where Cowslip lived in Richard Adams' Watership Down was in High Wood, just north-east of Burghclere village.

In the book Rural Rides published by William Cobbett in 1830 the name of the village was recorded as Berghclere.

== See also ==
- Beacon Hill, a nearby hill fort
