= Grade II* listed buildings in Basingstoke and Deane =

There are over 20,000 Grade II* listed buildings in England. This page is a list of these buildings in the district of Basingstoke and Deane in Hampshire.

== List of buildings ==
Name	Location	Type	Completed (Note: The date given is the date used by Historic England as significant for the initial building or that of an important part in the structure's description.)	Date designated	Grid ref. (Note: Sometimes known as OSGB36, the grid reference is based on the British national grid reference system used by the Ordnance Survey.) Geo-coordinates	Entry number (Note: The "List Entry Number" is a unique number assigned to each listed building and scheduled monument by Historic England.)	Image
Hill House	Ashford Hill with Headley	Concrete-framed building	1970–72	19 December 2012	SU5312462142; 51°21′21″N 1°14′19″W	1402215	Upload Photo
Church of St Michael	Crux Easton, Ashmansworth	Church	1775	16 May 1966	SU4247856235; 51°18′13″N 1°23′31″W	1339798	Church of St Michael More images
Deanes Almshouses	Basingstoke	Almshouse	1607	3 May 1949	SU6397851843; 51°15′44″N 1°05′04″W	1339724	Deanes Almshouses More images
Ruins of Chapel of the Holy Ghost	Basingstoke	Chapel	Ruin	3 May 1949	SU6355452613; 51°16′09″N 1°05′25″W	1092615	Ruins of Chapel of the Holy Ghost More images
Ruins of Chapel of the Holy Trinity	Basingstoke	Chapel	Ruin	3 May 1949	SU6358052613; 51°16′09″N 1°05′24″W	1230507	Ruins of Chapel of the Holy Trinity More images
St Thomas House (chapel)	Basingstoke	Chapel	c.1880	6 November 1984	SU6351653093; 51°16′24″N 1°05′27″W	1278440	St Thomas House (chapel) More images
Church of St Stephen	Baughurst	Church	1845	16 May 1966	SU5821059941; 51°20′08″N 1°09′57″W	1092592	Church of St Stephen More images
Wolverton House	Wolverton Park, Baughurst	House	18th century	16 May 1966	SU5536658517; 51°19′23″N 1°12′25″W	1092570	Wolverton House More images
Church of All Saints	Bradley	Church	1877	26 April 1957	SU6357541811; 51°10′19″N 1°05′31″W	1093023	Church of All Saints More images
Bull Down Farmhouse	Bramley Green, Bramley	Farmhouse	17th century	26 April 1957	SU6631258688; 51°19′24″N 1°02′59″W	1156638	Upload Photo
Earlstone Manor	Earlstone Common, Burghclere	Manor house	Late 14th century	16 May 1966	SU4795459923; 51°20′11″N 1°18′47″W	1339721	Upload Photo
Manor House	Old Burghclere	Manor house	Mid-14th century	18 May 1984	SU4690057889; 51°19′05″N 1°19′42″W	1092540	Upload Photo
Church of St Peter	Brown Candover, Candovers	Church	1845	26 April 1957	SU5818839707; 51°09′13″N 1°10′10″W	1093001	Church of St Peter More images
Church of All Saints	Deane	Church	1818	17 October 1984	SU5458250237; 51°14′55″N 1°13′10″W	1179721	Church of All Saints More images
Church of St Mary	Sydmonton, Ecchinswell, Sydmonton and Bishops Green	Former church	1849–53	16 May 1966	SU4848657896; 51°19′05″N 1°18′20″W	1092523	Church of St Mary More images
Sydmonton Court	Sydmonton, Ecchinswell, Sydmonton and Bishops Green	Country house	16th century	18 May 1984	SU4852457951; 51°19′07″N 1°18′18″W	1301426	Sydmonton Court More images
Church of St. Martin	Ellisfield	Church	13th century	26 April 1957	SU6386645892; 51°12′31″N 1°05′14″W	1092980	Church of St. Martin More images
Manor Farmhouse	Ellisfield	Farmhouse	Late 17th century	26 April 1957	SU6386745840; 51°12′30″N 1°05′14″W	1092981	Manor Farmhouse
Church of St. Andrew	Farleigh Wallop	Church	1750	26 April 1957	SU6251747526; 51°13′25″N 1°06′22″W	1302322	Church of St. Andrew More images
Farleigh Wallop House	Farleigh Wallop	House	1731	26 April 1957	SU6214446660; 51°12′57″N 1°06′42″W	1339532	Upload Photo
Pembrokes	Hartley Wespall	House	Early 17th century	17 October 1984	SU6935358382; 51°19′13″N 1°00′22″W	1178752	Upload Photo
Church of St. Mary	Herriard	Church	13th century	26 April 1957	SU6637546010; 51°12′34″N 1°03′04″W	1339500	Church of St. Mary More images
Church of St Michael Archangel	Highclere	Church	1870	16 May 1966	SU4401760298; 51°20′24″N 1°22′10″W	1339760	Church of St Michael Archangel More images
Heaven's Gate	Highclere Gate, Highclere	Garden feature	Mid-18th century	16 May 1966	SU4459657629; 51°18′58″N 1°21′41″W	1339737	Upload Photo
London Lodge	Highclere Park, Highclere	Gate	1793	16 May 1966	SU4587260373; 51°20′26″N 1°20′34″W	1166538	Upload Photo
The Temple	Highclere Park, Highclere	Folly	c.1760	16 May 1966	SU4555860084; 51°20′17″N 1°20′51″W	1166518	The Temple More images
Church of St Andrew	Hurstbourne Priors	Church	12th century	16 May 1966	SU4391846661; 51°13′03″N 1°22′21″W	1339806	Church of St Andrew More images
The Bee House	Hurstbourne Park, Hurstbourne Priors	House	Late 19th century	30 May 1984	SU4419846379; 51°12′54″N 1°22′07″W	1175623	Upload Photo
Church of St Mary	Kingsclere	Church	12th century	16 May 1966	SU5252158657; 51°19′29″N 1°14′52″W	1092447	Church of St Mary More images
20 Swan Street	Kingsclere	House	18th century	18 May 1984	SU5247358552; 51°19′25″N 1°14′54″W	1167623	20 Swan Street
Laverstoke House	Laverstoke Park, Laverstoke	House	1798	10 January 1953	SU4933849054; 51°14′19″N 1°17′41″W	1339659	Laverstoke House More images
Church of St James	Litchfield, Litchfield and Woodcott	Church	Norman	16 May 1966	SU4616054030; 51°17′01″N 1°20′22″W	1308204	Church of St James More images
Church of St. Mary	Mapledurwell and Up Nately	Church	13th century	26 April 1957	SU6874550973; 51°15′14″N 1°00′59″W	1092979	Church of St. Mary More images
Church of St. Stephen	Mapledurwell and Up Nately	Church	c.1200	26 April 1957	SU7006951971; 51°15′45″N 0°59′50″W	1092941	Church of St. Stephen More images
Countess of Huntingdon's Chapel	Mortimer West End	Chapel	1805	25 April 1980	SU6166164187; 51°22′24″N 1°06′56″W	1339519	Countess of Huntingdon's Chapel More images
Church of St. Leonard	Oakley	Church	Early 16th century	26 April 1957	SU5673350343; 51°14′58″N 1°11′19″W	1301811	Church of St. Leonard More images
Barn to south of South Litchfield Grange	Overton	Barn	17th century	12 April 1984	SU5307045855; 51°12′34″N 1°14′30″W	1092664	Upload Photo
Chapel	Quidhampton, Overton	Chapel	Norman	10 January 1953	SU5184150428; 51°15′02″N 1°15′31″W	1092696	Chapel
Church of St Mary	Overton	Church	Medieval	16 May 1966	SU5146349985; 51°14′48″N 1°15′51″W	1302540	Church of St Mary More images
Court Farmhouse	Overton	Farmhouse	16th century	16 May 1966	SU5136449991; 51°14′48″N 1°15′56″W	1339662	Court Farmhouse
Wyeford Farm House	Pamber	Farmhouse	Early 17th century	26 April 1957	SU5997258885; 51°19′33″N 1°08′26″W	1301155	Upload Photo
North Hall	Preston Candover	House	1794	26 April 1957	SU6041541578; 51°10′13″N 1°08′14″W	1092845	Upload Photo
Remains of the Church of St Mary	Preston Candover	Church	12th century	26 April 1957	SU6036541402; 51°10′07″N 1°08′17″W	1092852	Remains of the Church of St Mary More images
Church of St. Nicholas	Steventon	Cross	13th century	26 April 1957	SU5510147226; 51°13′18″N 1°12′45″W	1092810	Church of St. Nicholas More images
Bridge over the River Loddon	Stratfield Saye Park, Stratfield Turgis	Bridge	1802	26 April 1957	SU6966961191; 51°20′44″N 1°00′04″W	1092776	Bridge over the River Loddon More images
Church of All Saints	Tunworth	Church	12th century	26 April 1957	SU6734248445; 51°13′52″N 1°02′13″W	1092788	Church of All Saints More images
Hoddington House	Hoddington Park, Upton Grey	House	Late 17th century	26 April 1957	SU7009247855; 51°13′32″N 0°59′51″W	1092759	Upload Photo
St Lawrence's Church, Weston Patrick	Weston Patrick	Church	12th century	26 April 1957	SU6909446891; 51°13′01″N 1°00′44″W	1092728	St Lawrence's Church, Weston Patrick More images
Church of All Hallows	Whitchurch	Church	Norman	16 May 1966	SU4599447748; 51°13′37″N 1°20′34″W	1339652	Church of All Hallows More images
The Silk Mill	Whitchurch	Brush factory	c.1800	10 January 1953	SU4625547899; 51°13′42″N 1°20′20″W	1092645	The Silk Mill More images
Town Hall	Whitchurch	Town hall	Late 18th century	10 January 1953	SU4624348094; 51°13′49″N 1°20′21″W	1092680	Town Hall More images
Hackwood House	Hackwood Park, Winslade	Country house	1680	26 April 1957	SU6470049633; 51°14′32″N 1°04′28″W	1092734	Hackwood House More images
Stable block and riding school	Hackwood Park, Winslade	Courtyard	Early 19th century	26 April 1957	SU6451449875; 51°14′40″N 1°04′38″W	1296483	Stable block and riding school
The Menagerie Pond Pavilion	Hackwood Park (Spring Park), Winslade	Pavilion	18th century	26 April 1957	SU6506249464; 51°14′26″N 1°04′10″W	1092740	Upload Photo
Church of St. Lawrence	Wootton St Lawrence	Church	Norman	26 April 1957	SU5921253221; 51°16′30″N 1°09′09″W	1092711	Church of St. Lawrence More images
Tangier House	Wootton St. Lawrence	House	1662	26 April 1957	SU5816953161; 51°16′29″N 1°10′03″W	1092712	Tangier House More images
Worting House	Worting	House	Late 18th century	3 May 1949	SU5994352004; 51°15′51″N 1°08′32″W	1339701	Worting House More images
