= Candover =

Candover may refer to:

- Candover Brook, Hampshire, England
- The Candovers, civil parish in Hampshire, comprising
  - Brown Candover
  - Chilton Candover
  - Preston Candover
- Candover Clinic, Hampshire
- Candover Investments, private equity firm
