= Myvillages =

German-Dutch art collective

Myvillages is an international collective, founded in 2003 by artists Kathrin Böhm (UK/DE), Wapke Feenstra (NL) and Antje Schiffers (DE). Myvillages focuses on the rural as a place for cultural production and investigates the relationship between the countryside and the city, challenging and criticising the urban as the dominant cultural sphere.

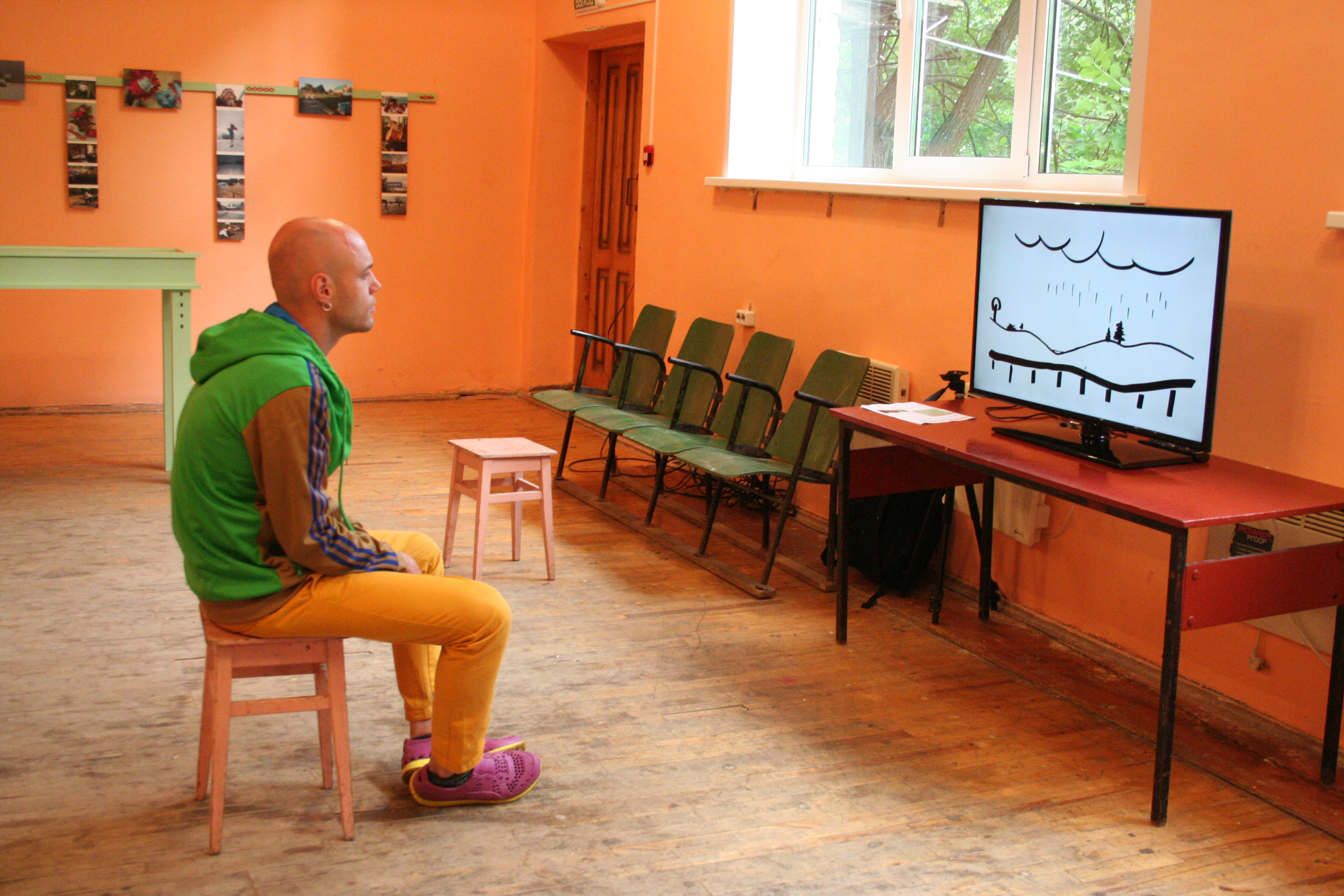
'Made in Zvizzchi' project, 2013,.Klub Show Archsroyania, RU. Photo by AMK Moscow

Myvillages addresses the rural, but does not define it. They pay attention to its peculiarities, and what remains as rural, be it a practice, a mindset or a place. The ‘rural’ can manifest itself in the countryside and the city; the movement of rural knowledge and identities is connected to migration and the urbanisation of societies. Myvillages, in this way, also addresses the major ecological and economical problems of today, where a lot can be learned from the countryside.

The three founders of Myvillages all come from a rural background. They are originally from small villages, which they left to study art in cities, to then stay in urban environments where the spaces for art making are more obvious. In 2001 they returned to their home villages to see and think them as places to work as artists, and slowly and in collaboration with many others created a network and critical thinking for a new way of making art around the rural.

Myvillages is registered as STICHTING INTERNATIONAL FOUNDATION myvillages.org, in the Netherlands.

== Projects (selection) ==
Myvillages organises and participates in co-operative projects in various villages and rural landscapes around the world, with a focus on Europe. Many of the projects are trans-local and international, and stay close to the everyday practices in the places where they are organised: for instance a village shop, community lunches, walking across the fields, or a film screening in a village hall. In general, the collective’s projects range from small-scale informal presentations to long-term collaborative research projects and permanent new cultural infrastructures.

- I Like Being a Farmer (2000–), an ongoing bartering project in which farmers film their everyday work in return for an oil painting.
- The Farm Drawings (2003–), a collection of drawings made during workshops, seminars and village hall meetings worldwide, where individuals sketch their memory of what a farm looks like.
- Bibliobox (2005–2015), a mobile archive with documents about rural contemporary art practices.
- The International Village Shop (2006–2023), a network of temporary shops in which goods are produced collectively with rural communities, and then traded across Myvillages’ rural and art world networks.
- Former Farmland (2008–09), which makes the agricultural history of urban areas visible through tours, walks, drawing and story-telling.
- The Pantry Project (2011), in which food from 80 producers and growers in and around Berlin was collected and preserved during a year, to make a real pantry in the exhibition to feed a festival at the House of World Cultures.
- Farmers and Ranchers (2012–2015), which brought together young cattle farmers from Friesland (NL) and Colorado (US) to experience and learn from each other's context in times of climate change.
- Company Drinks (2014–) began as Company: Movements, Deals and Drinks, an art project, exploring community making and commoning through collective and seasonal drinks production at the edge of Greater London.
- International Village Show (2015–16), a two year long exhibition at the Museum of Contemporary Art in Leipzig.
- Boerenzij – The Rural Side (2018–19), a project about existing but invisible rural cultures of traditional and migrant communities in South Rotterdam.
- The Rural School of Economics (2021–) grew out of the Eco Nomadic School (2011–18) and is a multi-lingual travelling class-room that connects localised knowledge through informal and inter-generational learning.

== Reception ==
Projects by Myvillages have been presented and exhibited internationally, at events and venues including Yerba Buena Center for the Arts, San Francisco (2008), Ars Electronica Festival, Linz (2008), Tate Britain, London (2010), TENT (nl), Rotterdam (2011), Haus der Kulturen der Welt, Berlin (2011), Fries Museum, Leeuwarden (2014), Hamburger Bahnhof, Berlin (2015), Parco d'Arte Vivente (it), Turin (2015), Museum for Contemporary Art (GFZK) (de), Leipzig (2015–16), Ludwig Múzeum, Budapest (hu) (2018), Whitechapel Gallery, London (2019), Victoria and Albert Museum, London (2019), and Kunsthalle Bratislava (2021).

Keynote presentations by Myvillages include the 2015 Re-Imagining Rurality Symposium at Westminster University.

Artefacts, objects and documentation resulting from the activities of Myvillages are included in public and museum collections, including Victoria and Albert Museum, London; Arts Maebashi Museum Collection, Maebashi; Kunstmuseum Thurgau; Kunstverein Springhornhof, Heiligendorf; Lawson Park Collection, Grizedale Arts; Fries Museum, Leeuwarden; PAV, Turino; and Haus der Kulturen der Welt, Berlin.

== Grants and awards ==
Myvillages has received grants and support from various cultural funders, including Erasmus+ EU; the European Cultural Foundation, NL; Mondriaan Fund NL; Sigrid Rausing Trust UK; Allianz Stiftung DE; and Kulturstiftung des Bundes DE. In 2014 Myvillages received the Create Art Award UK.

== Publications and films ==
=== Publications by Myvillages (selection) ===
- Wapke Feenstra, ed. (2007). De Beste Plek / The Best Place (in Dutch and English). Rotterdam: Veenman Publishers. ISBN 978-90-8690-144-9. OCLC 270720347.
- Ich bin gerne Bauer und möchte es auch gerne bleiben / I like being a farmer and I would like to stay one (in English, Macedonian, Romanian, Dutch, and German). Antje Schiffers, Thomas Sprenger. Berlin: Argobooks. 2010. ISBN 978-3-941560-57-4. OCLC 655810982.
- Wapke Feenstra; Antje Schiffers, eds. (2011). Images of farming. Heijningen: Jap Sam Books. ISBN 978-94-90322-24-3. OCLC 696727543.
- Böhm, Kathrin (2012). Vorratskammer / Pantry (in German and English). Wapke Feenstra, Antje Schiffers, Thomas Sprenger. Berlin: Argobooks. ISBN 978-3-942700-26-9. OCLC 813285478.
- Pietsie Feenstra; Wapke Feenstra, eds. (2012). A Photographic Portrait of a Landscape. New Dimensions in Landscape Philosophy. Heijningen: Jap Sam Books. ISBN 978-94-90322-37-3. OCLC 833592653.
- Kathrin Böhm; Miranda Pope, eds. (2015). Company: Movements, Deals and Drinks. Heijningen: Jap Sam Books. ISBN 978-94-90322-56-4. OCLC 929592502.
- Wapke Feenstra, ed. (2015). Tekenen in Vlassenbroek, A Schelde Riverscape (in Dutch and English). Heijningen: Jap Sam Books. ISBN 978-94-90322-55-7. OCLC 930770551.
- Kathrin Böhm; Wapke Feenstra; Antje Schiffers, eds. (2016). International Village Show (in English and German). Berlin: Jovis Verlag GmbH. ISBN 978-3-86859-465-2. OCLC 966804892.
- Kathrin Böhm; Tom James; Doina Petrescu, eds. (2018). Learn to Act, Introducing the Eco Nomadic School. Paris: Peprav. ISBN 978-2-9530751-3-7. OCLC 1091075179.
- Myvillages, ed. (2019). The Rural. Documents of Contemporary Art. Cambridge, Massachusetts: Whitechapel Gallery and MIT Press. ISBN 978-0-262-53716-2. OCLC 1054375912.
- Feenstra, Wapke (2021). Boerenzij / The rural side (in Dutch and English). Prinsenbeek: Jap Sam Books. ISBN 978-94-92852-33-5. OCLC 1252061257.

=== Films (selection) ===
- Village Produce Films, an archive of films on the making of new goods for the International Village Shop, 2008 – ongoing
- Farmers & Ranchers: Growing Up in Changing Landscapes, 26min, 2014 Vorratskammer / Pantry, with Martin König, 45 min, 2012
- Foreign Pickers, 23 min, 2016
