= Tufton Warren =

Hamlet in Hampshire, England

Coordinates: 51.203227°N 1.336212°W

- Location within Hampshire
- OS grid reference: SU472448
- Civil parish: Tufton
- Shire county: Hampshire
- Region: South East
- Country: England
- Sovereign state: United Kingdom
- Post town: WHITCHURCH
- Postcode district: RG28 7
- Police: Hampshire and Isle of Wight
- Fire: Hampshire and Isle of Wight
- Ambulance: South Central

Tufton Warren is a hamlet close to the town of Whitchurch, Hampshire, England. It is in the civil parish of Hurstbourne Priors. The nearest town close to it is Whitchurch, which lies approximately 2.1 miles (3.4 km) north from the hamlet.

Accessing Tufton Warren is quite unusual, mainly because it is only accessible directly from a dual-carriageway, in this case being the A34. A crossroad-style junction formed of a gap in the central reservation leads to Tufton Warren in one direction, and Firgo in the other.
