= Nina Pope =

British artist (born 1967)

- Born: 1967 (age 58–59)
- Education: Edinburgh College of Art, Chelsea School of Art
- Awards: Northern Art Prize; 2008

Nina Pope (born 1968) is an artist that works with public art, installation, film making, and internet publishing that lives and works in London. Most of her work is done in collaboration with Karen Guthrie. Pope and Guthrie started working together as a collaborative duo in 1995 on projects that "enrich and inform public life"and they founded creative non-profit Somewhere (artist collective) in 2001.

== Education ==
Nina Pope attended the Edinburgh College of Art from 1987 to 1991, receiving a BA in Printmaking. She attended the Chelsea School of Art in London from 1991 to 1993, receiving a MA in Printmaking.

== Career ==
Pope began working with Karen Guthrie in 1995. Pope was part of an artist collective called The People From Off, which contributed to 'A Different Weekend' with their 'Festival of Lying'. Its members included Karen Guthrie, Anna Best, and Simon Poulter. She has an academic post at the Royal College of Art in Design Interactions and as an artist advisor. Pope and Guthrie founded Somewhere (artist collective), a creative non-profit to produce collaborative projects of interests.

=== Films ===
- The Closer We Get, as director of photography & producer (2014)
- Jaywick Escapes, as co-director & co-producer (2012)
- Cat Fancy Club, as co-director & co-producer (2008)
- Little Deluxe Living, as artist & collaborator (2008)
- Almanac, artist & collaborator (2007)
- Living with the Tudors (aka Sometime Later) (2007)
- Bata-ville: We are not afraid of the future (2005)
- Welcome To (2003)

=== Exhibitions, commissions, and other projects ===
- Tomorrow, Today 2014 - University of Cambridge NW Cambridge public art commission
- Past, Present, Somewhere 2014 - Retrospective solo show, Kettles Yard, Cambridge
- Art Lending Library 2012 - Contributing artists to project by Walker & Bromwich, Glasgow International Festival, Market Gallery
- The Floating Cinema, London 2011 – ongoing
- Can Art Save Us? 2010 - Millennium Galleries, Sheffield. Multiple 'Titchy/Kitschy' shown in Grizedale Arts contribution
- Abbey Gardens, What Will The Harvest Be? Inspired by the Plaistow Land Grabbers. Commissioned by London Borough of Newham 2009 – ongoing
- A Circle of Happiness, Jaywick Martello Tower 2009
- Schnucken, Elefanten und andere Gastgeschenke 2009 - Kunstverein Springhornhof, Germany. Multiple 'Titchy/Kitschy' shown in myvillages.org
- Agrifashionista.tv - Commissioned by A Foundation & Grizedale Arts for Rochelle School, London. Two projects - Karen Guthrie's 'The Grotto' (postponed indefinitely) and a musical collaboration 'A Song for a Circus' between Nina Pope and Tim Olden.
- Broadcast Yourself 2007 - TV swansong archive exhibited as part of group show at Hatton Gallery (Newcastle) and Cornerhouse (Manchester)
- Almanac, Public art commission for the redevelopment of Cinema City, Norwich 2007
- Sometime Later, Commissioned by BBC & Arts Council England, 2006
- Pilot 3 2007 - Selected for archive for artists & curators, shown at Atelier Bevilacqua, Venice Biennale (Italy)
- Romantic Detachment, Video work, group show, PS1, New York City & touring to Q in Derby, Folly in Lancaster & Chapter in Cardiff 2004
- London Underground Platform for Art, Featured artists 2003
- Live Culture, Curators exhibitors, video programme, Tate Modern, London 2003
- TV Swansong, Nationwide public art site-specific webcast project commissioning 8 artists (artists / curators) 2002
- The Festival of Lying 2000 - Live event & web cast with Anna Best & Simon Poulter; Grizedale Show, Cumbria, UK

=== Awards and honors ===
- 2008 Northern Art Prize awarded to Karen Guthrie and Nina Pope.
- 2010 Karen Guthrie and Nina Pope's new media installation ‘An Artist’s Impression’ was acquired by the Science Museum, London
