= Lucy Mackintosh =

Lucy Mackintosh may refer to:

- Lucy Mackintosh (historian), New Zealand museum curator and historian
- Lucy Mackintosh Gallery, former contemporary art space in Lausanne, Switzerland
