= The Plague Dogs =

The Plague Dogs may refer to:

- The Plague Dogs (novel), 1977
- The Plague Dogs (film), 1982 adaptation of the novel
