= Kathrin Böhm =

German artist

- Born: 1969 (age 56–57)
- Occupation: Artist

Kathrin Böhm (born 1969) is an artist who is operating in and outside of the art world.

Her work is defined by collaborations and the co-production of culture and change within everyday situations, such as businesses, villages or urban neighbourhoods.

Böhm's understanding of culture is rooted within the concept of 'Cultural Democracy', and she practices art as a particular form of cultural production, which is important but not special.

Since the mid-nineties, Böhm has expanded the terms of socially engaged practice, in which she co-produces complex organisational, spatial, visual and economic forms. Böhm works internationally, including teaching and publishing, and contributes as a researcher to the wider topics of 'New Economy', 'Usership of Art' and the 'Production of Public Space'.

Her exhibition 'Compost' at The Showroom in London in 2021 marked a significant shift. Böhm stopped starting new projects and instead composted her work to date, to make fertiliser for evolving long term infrastructures such as Company Drinks, The Centre for Plausible Economies, and Myvillages’ Rural School of Economics.

Böhm holds a professorship for Art within Corporate Context at Alanus University in Alfter since 2022. She is a member of the Community Economies Institute and the Community Economies Research Network.

== Training ==
Böhm first studied Painting and Art Pedagogy at the Academy of Fine Arts, Nuremberg from 1990 to 1995, and later did a part-time MA in Fine Art at Goldsmiths College in London between 1996 and 1997.

== Co-Founder Collectives and Organisations ==
Kathrin is the founder and co-founder of numerous collectives and organisations:

- international and trans-local artist collective Myvillages (2002, ongoing)
- women-led UNO INO business consultancy co-operative (2021, ongoing)
- London based arts enterprise Company Drinks (2014, ongoing)
- Artist initiative Keep it Complex - Make it Clear (2016–21)
- Centre for Plausible Economies together with Kuba Szreder (2018, ongoing)
- art and architecture collective Public Works (2003 – 2012).

== Early collaborations ==
Collaborative projects within the university environment include 'Galeria Quattro Stazione', and 'One Night Pub' with Lisa Cheung. Co-curated exhibitions include 'The longer the better' (Jelängerjelieber) (1995) at Kunstbunker Nürnberg and 'Nice to meet you' (1998) together with Gavin Wade. Collaborative on-site work within an exhibition context was explored during 'Happy Hobby' at Tabot Gallery (1998) and 'Pic Nics' at Camden Arts Centre (1999), both with Stefan Saffer.

== Public Works and Myvillages ==
Böhm's long term involvement with the art and architecture collective Public Works started in 1999 through a collaborative public art commission together with Stefan Saffer and Andreas Lang. She is a founding member of the group.

Public Works is a shared space and practice for researching, discussing and implementing art in relation to everyday public space. Public Works was set up as a truly inter-disciplinary practice, in which both professional fields, art and architecture, are allowed to explore the autonomous and the applied through collaboration. The focus of Public Works is the urban public realm and its participatory development in the context of self-initiatives and formal regeneration programs. Important projects developed during Böhm's thirteen years of practice include Mobile Porch, a roaming mini-architecture for urban neighbourhoods, Park Products for the Serpentine Gallery and Kensington Gardens and most recently Colchester Inn, a multi-authored new public space for firstside's adjacent city square.

Böhm is also a founding member of the artist group Myvillages, together with Wapke Feenstra (NL) and Antje Schiffers (Ger). Myvillages.org started in 2003 after extensive conversation between the three artists on the predominance of the urban in contemporary art and the role of the rural as a space for and of cultural production.

Myvillages’ activities encompass a broad range of projects, amongst them the ongoing 'our villages' series, the 'Eco Nomadic School', the 'Vorratskammer (Pantry)' project and the 'International Village Shop'.

== Key projects ==
=== andmillionsandmillions ===
(2001-2021)

An expanding collection of posters and prints used for public large-scale cut-and-paste installations.

=== Park Products ===
(public works, 2003-2004)

Commissioned by Sally Tallant for The Serpentine Galleries in Kensington Gardens, London.

=== Folk Float ===
(public works, 2007)

A Creative Egremont initiative curated by Grizedale Arts and Karen Guthrie.

=== Folkestonomy ===
(public works, 2008)

Commissioned by Andrea Schlieker for the Folkestone Triennial.

=== International Village Shop ===
(Myvillages, 2006 - ongoing)

The shop is now run by Myvillages, and was initially set up with public funding for Grizedale Arts’ 'Agrifashionsita TV' at the Royal Academy in London.

=== Trade Show ===
(2012)

Co-curated with Gavin Wade for Eastside Projects Birmingham and R-urban, Paris.

=== Eco Nomadic School ===
(2012–18)

A self-organised school for trans-local mutual learning.

=== Haystacks Series ===
(2014, ongoing)

City based events to address local rural practices.

=== Company Drinks ===
(2014 – ongoing)

A space for making community by making drinks together, based in the Greater London Borough of Barking and Dagenham.

=== Culture is a Verb ===
(2017-2020)

The design of the public areas of Mansion of the Futures, Lincoln, UK.

=== Re-drawing the Economy ===
(2018)

A hands-on research project to visualise diverse economies and their transformative potential.

=== The Interdependence ===
(2019, ongoing)

A multi-local economic identifier, within the context of the Communities Economies Network.

=== Rural School of Economics ===
(Myvillages, 2020, ongoing)

A trans-local space for learning from and about women-led economies and the non-human.

== Publications ==
- Böhm, K., Szreder, K. (2020) Icebergian Economies of Contemporary Art. Pyrammmida: London
- Böhm, K., Feenstra, W. (editors) (2019) The Rural. Documents of Contemporary Art. Whitechapel Gallery and MIT Press: London und Cambridge (US)
- Böhm, K., James, T., Petresu, D. (2017). Learn To Act. Introducing the Eco Nomadic School. Peprav: Paris.
- Böhm, K., Feenstra, W., Schiffers, A. (2016). International Village Show. Alle Dörfer an einem Ort. Zusammen mit der Galerie für Zeitgenössische Kunst Leipzig. Jovis: Berlin
- Böhm, K. (2016) Trade as Public Real, Economy as Public Space. Trade Test Site: Copenhagen
- Böhm, K., Pope, M. (2015). Company: Movements, Deals and Drinks. Jap Sam Books: Prinsenbeek
- Böhm, K. (2009) Who is Building What? CADRE Research Centre, University of Wolverhampton: Wolverhampton
- Wilson, M., ONeill, P. (2022) Art on the scale of life. Coproduced with The Showroom London.Sternberg Press: Berlin/London
