= Firgo =

Hamlet in Hampshire, England

Coordinates: 51.202581°N 1.339645°W

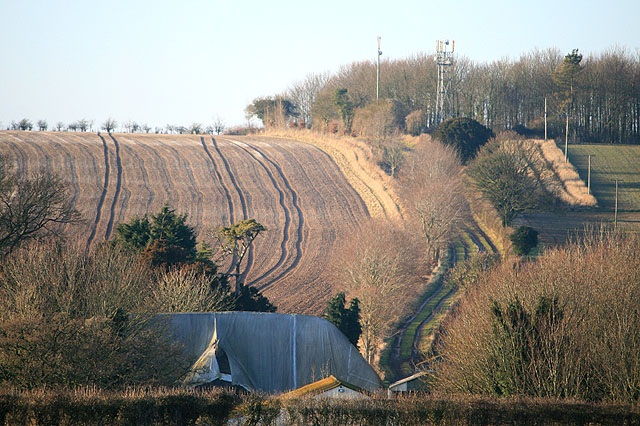
- Firgo Farm

- Location within Hampshire
- OS grid reference: SU461444
- Shire county: Hampshire
- Region: South East
- Country: England
- Sovereign state: United Kingdom
- Post town: Whitchurch
- Postcode district: RG28
- Police: Hampshire and Isle of Wight
- Fire: Hampshire and Isle of Wight
- Ambulance: South Central

Firgo is a hamlet adjacent to Longparish village and close to the town of Whitchurch, Hampshire, England.

Firgo Farmhouse is a 17th century Grade II Listed building.

The hamlet finds itself in a particular location that is only accessible directly from a dual-carriageway, in this case the A34. A crossroad-style junction formed of a gap in the central reservation leads to Firgo in one direction and Tufton Warren in the other.
