= Abbey Gardens =

Abbey Gardens may refer to:

- Abbey Gardens, Bakers Row, a community garden on the site of Stratford Langthorne Abbey, London, England
- Abbey Gardens, Bury St Edmonds, the surviving gardens of the abbey in Bury St Edmunds, Suffolk, England
- Abbey Gardens, Kylemore, the gardens of Kylemore Abbey in Connemara, County Galway, Ireland
- Abbey Gardens, Tresco, a garden on the island of Tresco in the Isles of Scilly, England
- Abbey House Gardens, a country house garden in Malmesbury, Wiltshire, England
