= John Haime =

English Wesleyan Methodist preacher

- Born: 18 February, 1708; Shaftesbury, Dorset, England
- Died: 18 August, 1784 (aged 76); Whitchurch, Hampshire, England
- Occupation: Wesleyan Methodist preacher

John Haime (18 February 1708 –18 August 1784) was an English Wesleyan Methodist preacher.

== Life ==
Haime was born in Shaftesbury, Dorset on 18 February, 1708. He initially worked as a button maker, and gardener before enlisting in the British Army. Grace Abounding to the Chief of Sinners is credited as being an early influence on Haime, and he became known as the 'Soldier preacher'.

In 1743, Haime fought in the Battle of Dettingen, as well as the Battle of Fontenoy in 1745, both conflicts in the War of the Austrian Succession. Upon the end of the clonflict, he returned to his hometown and began preaching. Following a brief imprisonment in Dorchester caused by his public preaching, he became a travelling preacher, being appointed by John Wesley in 1747.

Haime died at Whitchurch, Hampshire on 18 August, 1784, and was buried at the Whitchurch Methodist church.
