= Duncan McLaren (author) =

British writer (born 1957)

- Born: 1957 (age 68–69)
- Occupation: Writer

Duncan McLaren (born 1957) is a British writer, critic, and author. He is known for his books Looking For Enid: The Mysterious And Inventive Life Of Enid Blyton, published by Granta, and Evelyn!: Rhapsody for an Obsessive Love, published by Harbour Books. He was a writer in residence at Grizedale Arts in 2002.

Since 2021, McLaren has been writing a biography of the conceptual artist On Kawara.

== Career ==
McLaren's career has included book writing, journalism, and authoring essays for exhibition catalogues. He also maintained a blog, which was shortlisted for the Orwell Prize for Blogs in 2011.

=== Books ===
- Evelyn! Rhapsody for an Obsessive Love (2015, Harbour Books)
- George MacDonald 1824–1905 (2007, Deveron Arts)
- Looking For Enid: The Mysterious and Inventive Life of Enid Blyton (2007, Granta)
- The Strangled Cry of the Writer-in-Residence (2002, Grizedale Arts)
- Personal Delivery (1998, Quartet Books)

His book Looking For Enid: The Mysterious and Inventive Life of Enid Blyton received the Saga Magazine's Grown-Up Award for Non-Fiction in 2007.

=== Essays for Catalogues ===
McLaren has contributed essays to numerous exhibition catalogues for artists such as Bill Drummond and Sharon Kivland.
