= Karen Guthrie =

British artist

- Born: 1970 (age 55–56)
- Education: Edinburgh College of Art, Royal College of Art
- Awards: Northern Art Prize; 2008

Karen Guthrie (born 1970) is a British artist that works with public art, installation, film making, and internet publishing. She lives and works in the Lake District, UK. Most of her work is done in collaboration with Nina Pope. Guthrie and Pope started working together in London as a collaborative duo in 1995 on projects that "enrich and inform public life" and they founded creative non-profit Somewhere (artist collective) in 2001.

== Education ==
Karen Guthrie attended the Edinburgh College of Art from 1987 to 1991, receiving a BA in Printmaking. She attended the Royal College of Art in London from 1991 to 1993, receiving a MA in Printmaking.

== Career ==
Guthrie began working with Nina Pope in 1995. She was part of an artist collective called The People From Off, which contributed to 'A Different Weekend' with their 'Festival of Lying'. Its members included Nina Pope, Anna Best, and Simon Poulter. Karen works on many public arts projects including initiatives with Grizedale Arts, including their website and land / garden development projects. Guthrie and Pope founded Somewhere (artist collective), a creative non-profit to produce collaborative projects of interest.

=== Films ===
- Making, A Life, as co-director & co-producer with Maria Benjamin, a portrait of Lakes artist Peter Hodgson
- The Closer We Get, as director & co-producer (2015), uncovering her own families hidden stories
- Jaywick Escapes, as co-director & co-producer (2012)
- The View From My House, directed and edited films made with inmates of HMP Preston (2008)
- Cat Fancy Club, as co-director & co-producer (2008)
- Almanac, artist & collaborator (2007)
- Little Deluxe Living, co-directed and produced (2007)
- Living with the Tudors, researched, wrote, directed & produced (a.k.a. Sometime Later) (2007)
- Life-size Lilliput (2006)
- Bata-ville: We are not afraid of the future, co-produced, wrote, directed & distributed (2005)
- Welcome To, Writer, director & producer (2003)

=== Exhibitions, commissions, and other projects ===
- The Years of Magical Thinking 2017 - Exhibition of work produced as Artist-in-Residence at the National Trust property Acorn Bank
- A Fair Land 2016 - Irish Museum of Modern Art, Dublin. Collaboration with public works on 'Glut' - a barn and pop-up vegetable garden
- House of Ferment 2014/17 - A collaborative food installation with Grizedale Arts touring to various venues including Harris Museum Preston, Hauser & Wirth Somerset & Coniston Institute
- Soil Culture - Artist-in-residence with Hauser & Wirth Somerset. Project curated by the Centre for Contemporary Art & the Natural World toured to various venues including Bristol Create, Hauser & Wirth Somerset, the Eden Project, Thelma Hulbert Gallery, Honiton and White Moose, Barnstaple.
- Tomorrow, Today 2014 - University of Cambridge NW Cambridge public art commission
- Past, Present, Somewhere 2014 - Retrospective solo show, Kettle's Yard, Cambridge
- Art Lending Library 2012 - Contributing artists to project by Walker & Bromwich, Glasgow International Festival, Market Gallery
- The Floating Cinema, London 2011 – ongoing
- Can Art Save Us? 2010 - Millennium Galleries, Sheffield. Multiple 'Titchy/Kitschy' shown in Grizedale Arts contribution
- Abbey Gardens, What Will The Harvest Be? Commissioned by London Borough of Newham 2009 – ongoing
- A Circle of Happiness, Jaywick Martello Tower 2009
- Schnucken, Elefanten und andere Gastgeschenke 2009 - Kunstverein Springhornhof, Germany. Multiple 'Titchy/Kitschy' shown in myvillages.org
- Agrifashionista.tv - Commissioned by A Foundation & Grizedale Arts for Rochelle School, London. Two projects - Karen Guthrie's 'The Grotto' (postponed indefinitely) and a musical collaboration 'A Song for a Circus' between Nina Pope and Tim Olden
- Broadcast Yourself 2007 - TV swansong archive exhibited as part of group show at Hatton Gallery (Newcastle) and Cornerhouse (Manchester)
- Almanac, Public art commission for the redevelopment of Cinema City, Norwich 2007
- Seven Samurai & Return of the Seven Samurai (2007)
- Sometime Later, Commissioned by BBC & Arts Council England, 2006
- Pilot 3 2007 - Selected for archive for artists & curators, shown at Atelier Bevilacqua, Venice Biennale (Italy)
- Romantic Detachment, Video work, group show, PS1, New York City & touring to Q in Derby, Folly in Lancaster & Chapter in Cardiff 2004
- London Underground Platform for Art, Featured artists 2003
- Live Culture, Curators exhibitors, video programme, Tate Modern, London 2003
- TV Swansong, Nationwide public art site-specific webcast project commissioning eight artists and curators 2002
- The Festival of Lying 2000 - Live event & web cast with Anna Best & Simon Poulter; Grizedale Show, Cumbria, UK

=== Awards and honors ===
- 2008 Northern Art Prize awarded to Karen Guthrie and Nina Pope
- 2010 Karen Guthrie and Nina Pope's new media installation ‘An Artist’s Impression’ was acquired by the Science Museum, London
- 2015 At the Hot Docs film festival in Toronto, Guthrie's The Closer We Get awarded the juried Best International Feature Documentary Award In the same year it also won Best UK Feature Documentary at London's Open City Documentary Festival & Best UK feature at the Scottish Mental Health Arts & Film Festival
- 2016 Guthrie's The Closer We Get was awarded juried Special Awards at Flahertiana International Documentary Film Festival (Russia) & Budapest International Documentary Festival
- 2016 Guthrie was awarded the Women Filmmakers Award at the LA Diversity Film Festival
- 2017 Guthrie was awarded the Dorothy Una Ratcliffe Fellowship by the National Trust
