= Whitchurch Town Hall =

Municipal building in Whitchurch, Hampshire, England

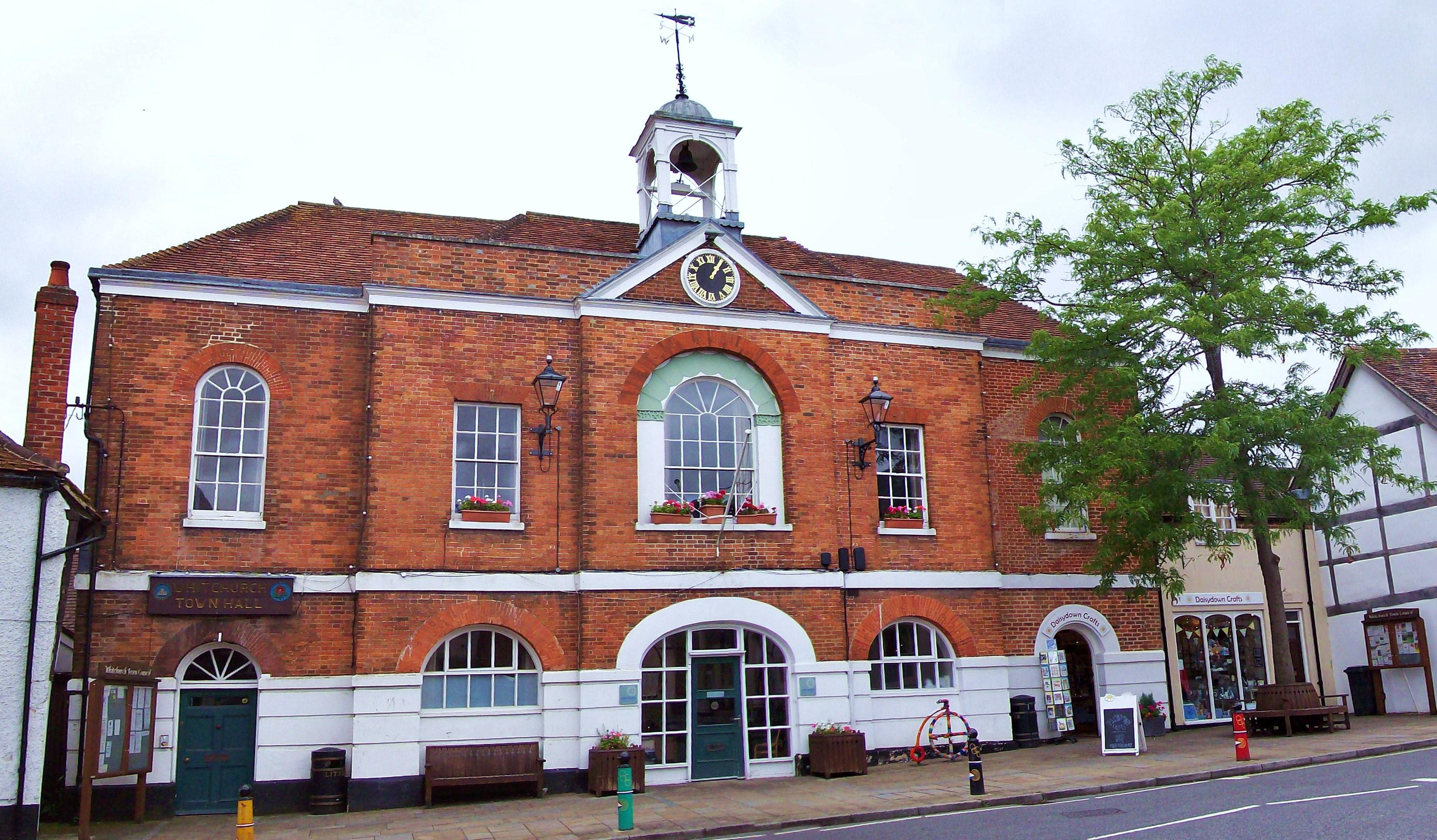
- Whitchurch Town Hall

- Shown in Hampshire
- 51.2302°N 1.3391°W
- Location: Newbury Street, Whitchurch

History
- Built: 1791

Site notes
- Architectural style: Neoclassical style

Listed Building – Grade II*
- Official name: Town Hall
- Designated: 10 January 1953
- Reference no.: 1092680

Whitchurch Town Hall is a municipal structure in Newbury Street, Whitchurch, Hampshire, England. The structure, which is the meeting place of Whitchurch Town Council, is a Grade II listed building.

== History ==
The first municipal building in Whitchurch was an old town house in the centre of The Square; after it became dilapidated, it was demolished in the 1780s and the lord of the manor, Viscount Midleton, who was both a local member of parliament and an Irish peer, offered to pay for a new structure. The new building was designed in the neoclassical style, built in red brick with stone dressings and was completed in December 1791.

The design involved a symmetrical main frontage with five bays facing onto Newbury Street; the central section of three bays was slightly projected forward, while the central bay was further projected forward. The building was arcaded on the ground floor with a wide opening in the central bay. On the first floor, the central bay was fenestrated with a wide round headed window in the central bay, with sash windows in the flanking bays and with round headed windows in the outer bays. At roof level there was a cornice, a parapet and a central pediment with a clock in the tympanum, and there was a square turret with a dome and a weather vane. Internally, the principal room was the assembly room on the first floor which was the meeting place of the court leet.

Whitchurch had a very small electorate and a dominant patron (Thomas Townshend), which meant it was recognised by the UK Parliament as a rotten borough: the right of the borough to elect members of parliament was removed by the Reform Act 1832. The building was also used as a police station, with police cells in the basement, until 1862, when a purpose-built police station was completed in The Lynch. In July 1852 the local mechanics institute took a lease of the assembly room on the understanding that it would remain available for public meetings. A replacement clock, funded by public subscription, was installed in the pediment in 1867. The mechanics institute moved out of the assembly room in 1878 and the building was extensively refurbished as part of celebrations for the Diamond Jubilee of Queen Victoria in 1897. In the late 19th century, the town hall came under the management of trustees and, in the 1960s, the trustees, who at that time included the lawyer and judge, Lord Denning, commissioned works to restore the building and replace its roof.

For much of the 20th century, Whitchurch was administered by Kingsclere and Whitchurch Rural District Council from offices in Kingsclere, but following implementation of the Local Government Act 1972, which saw the formation of the enlarged Basingstoke and Deane District Council, Whitchurch exercised its right to form a parish council, and the new council, which became known as Whitchurch Town Council, chose the town hall as its meeting place and relocated its staff there.

In January 2010, HSBC, who as Midland Bank had been tenants part of the ground floor since the mid-20th century, closed its branch and vacated the building. An extensive programme of refurbishment works, which included the installation of a lift and new glazing on the front of the building, was completed at a cost of £180,000 in September 2021.

== See also ==
- Grade II* listed buildings in Basingstoke and Deane
