= Ryota Kuwakubo =

Japanese artist

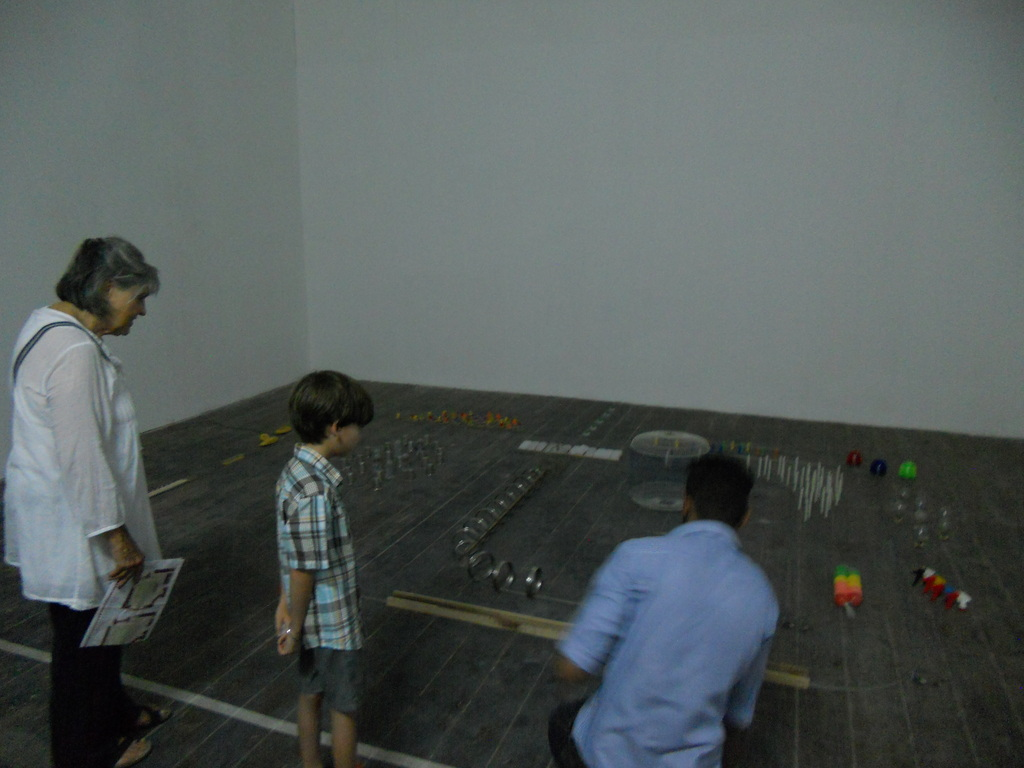
Visitors seeing Ryota Kuwakubo's installation at Kochi-Muziris biennale 2014

Ryota Kuwakubo (born 1971) is a Japanese multimedia artist. Kuwakubo was born in Tochigi Prefecture. In 1998 he co-produced the project BITMAN with the art unit Maywa Denki. Kuwakubo works with varying mediums, most commonly utilizing digital or electronic aspects, and a typical theme his works center on is contrasting matter.

In 2010 Kuwakubo exhibited at Cyber Arts Japan, a special media art exhibition hosted by the Museum of Contemporary Art, Tokyo. A 2011 interactive art piece of his, The Tenth Sentiment, was displayed at the "Ways of Worldmaking" exhibit at the National Museum of Art, Osaka. In The Tenth Sentiment the viewers walk around a room as a model train with an LED light maneuvers along a set of tracks, focusing a light at commonplace objects on the ground which subsequently cast large shadows on the walls of the room. These shadows change from crowds of people, to cityscapes, to tunnels as the piece continues. The Tenth Sentiment was awarded a prize of excellence at the 14th Japan Media Arts Festival which described it as an "attractive work" which avoids the "cliché interactive art works that tend to depend too much on technology", and described by art critic for The Japan Times, Matthew Larking, as "arguably the most attractive work" of the exhibit.

== Education ==
- University of Tsukuba, Plastic Art and Mixed Media course 1993
- University of Tsukuba, M.A., Design (Plastic Art and Mixed Media Dept.) 1996,
- International Academy of Media Arts and Sciences, 2001

== Bibliography ==
=== Major exhibitions ===
- Cocosocoasoco (2006) together with Reico Yamaguchi under the name Perfektron, Lucy Mackintosh Gallery, Lausanne, Switzerland
- Cyber Arts Japan (2010), Museum of Contemporary Art, Tokyo
- Ways of Worldmaking (2011), National Museum of Art, Osaka

=== Major works ===
- Bit-hike (1999)
- Vomoder(2000)
- Heaven Seed(2000)
- Duper/Looper(2001)
- Video Bulb
- PLX (2001)
- ShiriFurin (2009)
- Nikodama (2009)
- The Tenth Sentiment (2011)

=== Commercial collaborations ===
- Commercial video for Sony Tablet
