= Testbourne Community School =

Location
- Micheldever Road; Whitchurch, Hampshire, RG28 7JF; England; 51.22549°N 1.33514°W

Information
- Type: Foundation School
- Local authority: Hampshire
- Department for Education URN: 116502 Tables
- Ofsted: Reports
- Gender: Coeducational
- Age: 11 to 16
- Enrolment: 937
- Website: testbourne.hants.sch.uk

Testbourne Community School in Whitchurch, Hampshire, England, has been a secondary school since the Victorian era and is a foundation school. It has around 900 pupils aged 11–16. The headteacher is Jon Beck, who was appointed in September 2017.

== Academic standards ==
The school was rated as Good by the school regulator Ofsted in its most recent inspection, which took place in November 2023 (down from Outstanding in November 2010). The OFSTED inspectors praised the SEND department "The individual needs of these pupils are known and met" the inspectors also said the leadership is supportive towards staff. "Leaders provide support to a professional and committed staff body who hold high aspirations for all pupils. . . A comprehensive professional development programme provides frequent opportunities for staff to share best practice and improve their teaching knowledge to help pupils achieve. Workload is managed effectively, to ensure that time is spent focusing on the well-known school improvement priorities."

== Notable achievements ==
The school was awarded the Artsmark Silver award in 2004. It previously had performing arts specialist status from 2005.

=== Kid Witness News ===
Students have won several awards in the 'Kid Witness News' competition over the years. In May 2010, a video called B is for Apple won the award for Best Story at the European competition held in Hamburg. They had won the UK Grand Prix and UK Best Story-telling awards at the UK competition held in Derby earlier that month.

In 2009, students won the Global Citizenship Award at the International KWN finals in Japan for their video called Dansez What You Can’t Sez.

The following year, the student's film Won’t Listen Can’t Hear won 'best soundtrack' and came third overall (out of 626 schools worldwide).

=== Sport ===
In June 2005, although the school has no dedicated rugby union pitch or posts, their U12 rugby team won its age-group final at The Daily Telegraph Emerging Schools Final at Twickenham in a competition involving 2,000 teams and 40,000 children across the United Kingdom.
