= The Plague Dogs (novel) =

1977 novel by Richard Adams

- First edition cover from 1977
- Author: Richard Adams
- Illustrator: A. Wainwright
- Cover artist: Martin White
- Language: English
- Genre: Adventure fiction, science fiction, thriller fiction
- Publisher: Allen Lane
- Publication date: 22 September 1977
- Publication place: United Kingdom
- Media type: Print (hardback & paperback)
- Pages: 461 (hardback edition)
- ISBN: 978-0-7139-1055-1 (hardback edition)
- OCLC: 3496427
- Dewey Decimal: 823/.9/14
- LC Class: PZ4.A2163 Pl PR6051.D345

The Plague Dogs is a novel by English author Richard Adams, first published in 1977 by Allen Lane. The book centres on the friendship of two dogs that escape an animal testing facility and are subsequently pursued by both the government and the media. As in Adams' debut novel, Watership Down (1972), the animal characters in The Plague Dogs are anthropomorphised.

The Plague Dogs features location maps drawn by Alfred Wainwright, a fellwalker and author. The conclusion of the book involves two real-life characters, Adams' long-time friend Ronald Lockley, and the world-famous naturalist Sir Peter Scott. Having seen a manuscript, both men readily agreed to be identified with the characters and opinions that Adams had attributed to them, as is shown in Adams' preface to the book.

In 1982, The Plague Dogs was adapted into an animated feature film of the same name.

== Plot ==
In the Lake District of England, Animal Research: Scientific and Experimental (or ARSE) conducts cruel and unusual experiments on animals, including two dogs named Rowf and Snitter. Rowf, a mongrel who was born in the lab, is made to swim in a large water tank for extended periods. Snitter, a terrier who was domesticated until his owner's supposed death, is given brain surgery which impairs his sense of reality. He often presents as disoriented or delusional, with limited periods of lucidity.

One night, Snitter squeezes out of his cage and into Rowf's, where they notice his door is unlatched. The dogs escape from the research station and roam the countryside. While the dogs are afraid of being caught by the "whitecoats" (doctors), Snitter is hopeful they will find a human who will give them food. Rowf, who has never experienced human kindness, is less convinced. The next day, the people of a nearby village are indifferent towards the dogs. By nightfall, they resort to killing a sheep, embracing their new role as wild animals. However, the physical toll of killing sheep, plus the possibility of being shot by farmers, present problems for the dogs.

They are approached by the Tod, a red fox with a Geordie accent, who offers to help them kill sheep and raid trash bins, while keeping them out of the way of angry humans. The dogs accept.

Local farmers become outraged as more of their sheep are killed, and local businessman David Ephraim organizes a hunt. Before Ephraim sets off, Snitter approaches his truck. Struck by empathy for the dog, Ephraim calls him over. Snitter gets into his truck with him, but as he climbs in, he accidentally steps on the trigger of Ephraim’s gun, killing him. Snitter escapes, but enters a particularly bad mental state, and is later found by Rowf and the Tod.

Mr. Ephraim’s death prompts the arrival of Digby Driver, a sensationalist reporter from London who writes human interest pieces. Driver interviews several locals, including Stephen Powell, who works at ARSE. Not knowing that Driver is a reporter, Powell confirms that two dogs did recently escape from the lab. He points Driver in the direction of Dr. Goodner, a German scientist who had been conducting experiments into the bubonic plague at the research station.

Driver also meets with Ann Moss, the sister of Snitter’s old owner Alan Wood. Wood was hit by a truck while pushing Snitter out of the way after he ran into the street. When Driver assumes the accident killed Wood, his sister confirms that she blamed Snitter, and sold him to ARSE after inheriting him. Snitter also recounts the loss of his master to Rowf, describing seeing him lying in the street, and people watching in horror. He knew she did not like him, and thought she blamed him for her brother's untidy bachelor lifestyle, preferring to spend his time with his dog.

The dogs end their partnership with the Tod after he takes a nest of eggs for himself. Driver publishes an article claiming that the dogs could have been exposed to the plague as they escaped the research station. Public perception of them shifts from anger to fear. Growing desperate for food, the dogs steal groceries from a car belonging to bank clerk Geoffrey Westcott, who had stopped at the side of a road. An embarrassed Westcott sets out to kill the dogs himself.

Rowf and Snitter argue and separate. Snitter runs into the Tod, who is being hunted in a fox hunt. The Tod, knowing he will be caught, thanks Snitter for his and Rowf's friendship. Later, Westcott spots Rowf from atop Dow Crag. Westcott leans over the edge to get a better shot, but a confused Snitter approaches him. Startled by Snitter, Westcott slips and falls to his death. On the verge of starvation, Rowf and Snitter consume his corpse. The discovery of the mutilated body leads to more media frenzy and public outcry over the dogs.

A battalion of the Parachute Regiment is deployed to kill Rowf and Snitter, who are chased to a beach. Despite his fear of water, Rowf swims out with Snitter. In the water, the dogs wonder whether they will make it to the Isle of Dog, a place where dogs are free from experiments and are only shown kindness. The dogs are on the verge of losing consciousness,when they are spotted by naturalists Sir Peter Scott and Ronald Lockley who are out for a sail. The men get the dogs aboard and head for the shore.

Meanwhile, Digby Driver receives a letter from Alan Wood. He was never dead, just badly injured and in hospital. When Driver assumed he was dead, Ann Moss went along with it to avoid being ostracized for selling Snitter to ARSE. After seeing Snitter's picture in the paper, Wood has been desperately trying to reach Driver. After confronting Moss for her lies, Driver meets Wood and breaks him out of the hospital. The two drive to the town the dogs were last seen in, but get lost along the way, ending up at the Drigg nature reserve.

This is the place where Scott and Lockley bring in their boat. Snitter is finally reunited with his master, who quickly offers to adopt Rowf as well. The troops leave, having no reason to kill the dogs. Rowf and Snitter look forward to their new lives, believing that they have made it to the Isle of Dog.

== Basis in reality ==
Adams stated in the book's introduction that "There is no such place in the Lake District as Animal Research (Scientific and Experimental). In reality, no single testing or experimental station would cover so wide a range of work as Animal Research. However, every 'experiment' described is one which has actually been carried out on animals somewhere." The location of "ARSE" (an acronym for Animal Research, Scientific and Experimental, and British slang for buttocks) was based on the remote hill farm of Lawson Park, now run as an artist residence by the contemporary art organisation Grizedale Arts.

== Characters ==
- Rowf: A shaggy, large black mongrel, born in the laboratory where he was drowned in a tank and revived repeatedly. Rowf escapes with Snitter, surviving by killing sheep and raiding trash bins. Rowf is downtrodden, cynical, and increasingly feral in his ways, since he has had a hard life and never met a decent human. As a result of the experimentation, he has a fear of water.
- Snitter: A black and white Fox Terrier. After he lost his master in a lorry accident, he was sold to the laboratory. The scientists in the lab perform numerous brain surgeries on Snitter, aiming to blur the boundary between objective reality and his subjective mind. He frequently declares there are flies inside his head, and occasionally hallucinates the sight of his master approaching. In his lucid moments, he is optimistic and quite intelligent.
- The Tod: A red fox encountered by Snitter and Rowf early in the story. He speaks in a Geordie dialect so distinct the book includes a glossary of Geordie slang in the introduction. He forges an uneasy friendship with the dogs, teaching them hunting and survival skills in return for a share of the kill. While Snitter can understand the Tod's speech patterns perfectly, Rowf cannot, leading to tensions between the three of them.
- Digby Driver: A reporter for the fictional London Orator. He is a self-centered man, writing wildly sensationalist articles with only the sketchiest grounding in fact. The media hysteria he creates causes panic among the local populace and eventually moves the government to deploy the army to exterminate the dogs.
- Dr. Boycott: A senior researcher at ARSE. He is callous and unfeeling, with no sympathy for either the animals in his experiments or his subordinate, Stephen Powell.
- Stephen Powell: Dr. Boycott's subordinate. Although he clearly possess sympathy for the animals at ARSE., he is also eager to prove himself to Dr. Boycott, and unwilling to speak up for fear of derailing his career.
- Dr. Goodner: A German scientist at ARSE carrying out secret research for the Ministry of Defence. He was a "researcher" in Buchenwald during the Second World War, but managed to conceal this information. Digby Driver finds out about Goodner's past, blackmailing him into revealing that he was researching the bubonic plague.
- Harry Tyson: The odd-job man at ARSE, in charge of feeding and cleaning the animals and general care-taking duties. It is his neglecting to close Rowf's cage properly that allows the dogs to escape.
- Geoffrey Westcott: A local bank clerk and recluse. While returning from a grocery shopping trip with his landlady, he stops for toilet purposes, and while both humans are out of the car the dogs invade the car and devour all the shopping. His anger at the violation of his prized car leads him on a solitary one-man crusade to destroy the dogs.
- David Ephraim: A Jewish businessman who organizes a hunt for the dogs. He encounters Snitter by himself during the hunt, and although he prepares to shoot him, he notices the surgical scar on the dog's head. Setting his gun aside, he tries to get Snitter to come get into his car. But when Snitter excitedly jumps up into his arms, his toe catches the trigger of Ephraim's shotgun, killing him instantly. Ephraim's death catches the attention of the media, who run with the story of the "dog who shot a man."
- Alan Wood: Snitter's master. He is a gentle, kindly man, in late middle age, working as a solicitor. For most of the book, Snitter believes him to be dead — he saved Snitter from being hit by a truck after the dog ran into the road. Snitter is wracked by guilt because he believes himself responsible for his master's death. Near the end of the story, it is revealed that Wood survived the accident and is recovering slowly in a hospital.
- Ann Moss: Alan Wood's sister (jokingly called "Annie Mossity", a play on "animosity") She is disdainful of her brother's untidy ways and hated Snitter. The responsibility of looking after Snitter falls to her after her brother's accident, which she discharges by selling him to ARSE. She is interviewed by Digby Driver, falsely confirming his assumption that her brother is dead.
- William Harbottle: Also known as "Hot Bottle Bill," Harbottle is the Secretary of State for the Environment who oversaw the establishment of ARSE at Lawson Park. After Digby Driver publishes the rumors of the dogs carrying the plague, Harbottle tries to protect his political career by lobbying for the implementation of Operation Gelert, in which a battalion of the Parachute Regiment is deployed to kill the dogs.
- The Under Secretary: Harbottle's senior civil servant. When he and Harbottle prepare to have the dogs shot after they are rescued from sea, the warden of the Drigg Nature Reserve and Digby Driver confront them and force them to leave.
- Kiff: Rowf and Snitter's former friend who died at ARSE.
- Dr. Fortescue: A researcher at ARSE who was responsible for Snitter's brain operations, which result in him suffering from hallucinations and seizures. It is implied that Fortescue's reasons for his experiments on Snitter were to determine if the effects would bear any similarities to the circumstances of the titular character from William Golding's novel Pincher Martin.

== Adaptations ==
Like its predecessor Watership Down, Martin Rosen directed and adapted The Plague Dogs into an animated feature film, which was released in 1982. Unlike the book, there is the implication that the Tod might still be alive in the film; a hunter who found him says he and the others "caught" a fox, this could imply the Tod is merely playing dead. In contrast to the ending in all published editions of the book—which describes the dogs being rescued from the sea, cleared of carrying the plague, and united with Snitter's lost master—the film ends the way Adams first envisioned (before being prevailed upon by his editor and others who read his original manuscript), with the dogs swimming out to sea, hoping to find what Snitter calls "The Isle of Dog" in the novel (though Rowf grimly speculates that it's probably the Isle of Man). After swimming for a while, Snitter eventually comes to the conclusion that he imagined the island. As he is about to give up and drown, Rowf claims to directly see the island and they struggle on. It then ends with them disappearing into the mist, supposedly heading to the island. In the film's credits an island can be seen in the distance, seemingly confirming that it is real.
