= David Blandy =

British artist

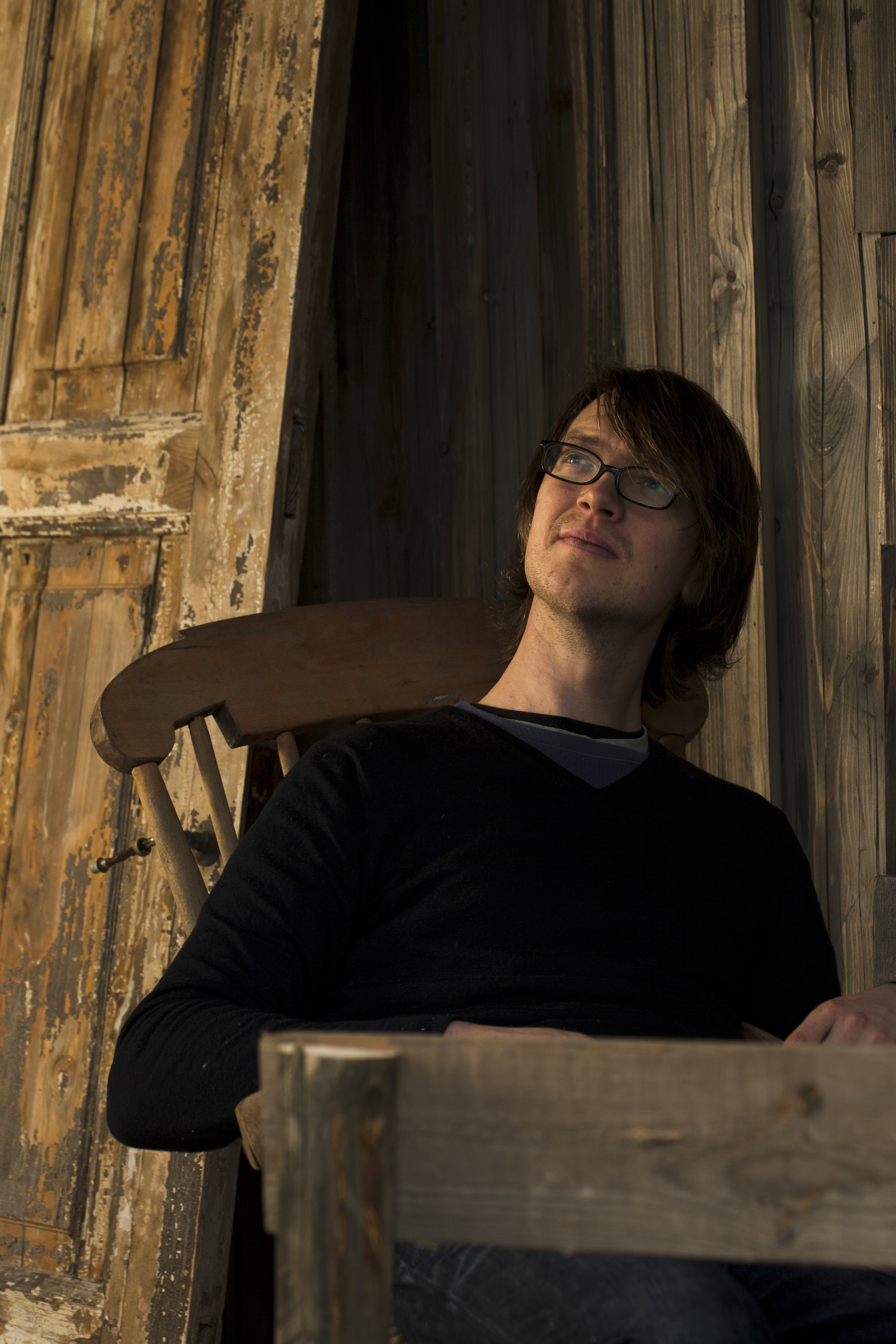
David Blandy

David Blandy (born 1976) is a British artist. He was educated at the Slade School of Fine Art and the Chelsea College of Art and Design in London. Blandy produces video, performances and comics that deal with his problematic relationship with popular culture.

Blandy gained an artist's residency with Grizedale Arts in 2004. In 2008, he was shortlisted in the Jerwood Moving Image Awards. Blandy won the Breakthrough Award at the South Bank Show Awards 2010.

== Bibliography ==
- (2003). "Beck's Futures Student Prize for Film and Video." Design Week. April 24.
- Glover, Michael (2004). "Nice Video, But Don't Call it Art." The Independent. January 13.
- Vaughan, Hannah (2005). "Barefoot Blandy." "Transition Tradition Magazine." October 2. https://web.archive.org/web/20071121055738/http://www.transitiontradition.com/magazine.php?issueID=2
