= Judith Goddard =

- Born: 1956; United Kingdom
- Known for: Video art

Judith Goddard (born 1956) is a British video artist. She has lived in London since 1980. Her works include single channel works, large-scale installation, photography, print and drawing.

Initially working with 16mm film installation and stills, Goddard began making videos in 1982 and is associated with the second wave of video art in the United Kingdom. Works include the three-screen video The Garden of Earthly Delights (1991) which presents a fragmented, dystopian view of life in the 1990s in the spirit of Hieronymus Bosch.

== Exhibitions ==
Recent exhibitions and screenings include Rewind, Tate Modern, (2012); Rewind & Play, Light Box, Tate Britain, London (2010); The Undistributed Middle, South London Gallery (2012); 12 Shooters - An Esoteric Afternoon, South London Gallery (2007); Upside Down/Inside Out: ‘Helen's Room’, Kettle's Yard, Cambridge (2009); AV 08 Newcastle (2008); Analogue. Pioneering Artists’ Video from the UK, Canada and Poland (1968–88), Tate Britain, London (2006); Mobile, Espace Landowski, Boulogne-Billancourt (2006); Cross Town Traffic, Apee Jay Media Gallery, New Delhi (2005);Tourism, online at Tank TV (2005); Wonderings, 47 Great Eastern Street, London (2005); Collage, Bloomberg Space, London (2004) and 100 Years of Artists Film and Video, Tate Britain, London (2004).
