= Grizedale Arts =

British arts commissioning agency

Grizedale Arts is a contemporary arts residency and commissioning agency based in Cumbria, England. Its primary artists' residency space is the former hill farm Lawson Park, sited on the edge of Grizedale Forest in the central Lake District. It also owns and runs a hybrid pub / arts centre The Farmer's Arms at Lowick, a listed building that was purchased with the support of investors and donors during the Covid19 pandemic. Grizedale Arts produces cultural projects locally, nationally and internationally with a particular focus on Japan, where a number of significant long term projects in rural communities have evolved. The focus of the organisation is on developing emerging artists and producing experimental projects that demonstrate the function of art as an everyday aspect of a worthwhile and productive life. The organisation is financially supported by Arts Council England. Adam Sutherland, director since 1999, guest-curated 'The Land We Live In, The Land We Left Behind' for Hauser & Wirth Somerset in 2018, a major historic and contemporary survey of rural cultures that attracted over 40,000 visitors to the galleries in Bruton.

In 2023 Adam Sutherland received an MBE for services to the arts, and in 2025 he was awarded the Ampersand Foundation Award. In 2024 the organisation won, with Hayatsu Architects, the Architects' Journal Small Project Award for a cold store / fermentation barn built at The Farmer's Arms. The Grizedale Arts Club was launched in 2024, as a membership organisation to help support Lawson Park and the organisation's future.

== History ==
The predecessor of Grizedale Arts, the Grizedale Society, was founded by Bill Grant OBE in 1968 to further the arts within the Grizedale forest. Bill worked as Head Forester for the Forestry Commission at the time. It initially concentrated on theatre and the visual arts. Bill created the Theatre in the Forest, a 230-seater venue, which attracted entertainers such as Sir Anthony Hopkins, Dame Judi Dench, Julian Lloyd Webber and Kenny Ball.

In 1977, Grant also established the Grizedale Sculpture Trail, which became world renowned for its siting of environmental sculptures by young upcoming sculptors. Artists were given a 6-month residency in the forest to create sculptures in keeping and inspired by the location. Notable artists included David Nash, Robert Koenig and Andy Goldsworthy. Many sculptures remain and are accessible to the public. Forestry England have continued the legacy of the Grizedale Society by continuing to commission artworks in the landscape . In 1990, the Society was awarded the Prudential Award for the Arts. "In tribute for a leap of imagination that has enriched our perception and understanding of art in the landscape.”

Bill Grant retired in 1997. Diana Walters and David Fenn followed as directors until Adam Sutherland was appointed in 1999. For financial reasons, the board closed down The Theatre in the Forest at this time. The Gallery in the Forest was re-purposed as studio and pop-up exhibition space as the organisation re-orientated towards a younger, emergent generation of artists and their diverse and sometimes challenging ideas about the rural environment. The artworks produced at this time were not popular with visitors, some of whom sent complaint letters and even damaged Sutherland's car. The local residents of Satterthwaite, after being offered the chance to create their own artwork for a billboard sculpture in the forest decided unanimously to burn it down instead. In 1999, Sutherland formed Grizedale Arts, merging it with the Grizedale Society to form a new organisation.

In 2007, the organisation moved its base from Grizedale Forest to the historic hill farm of Lawson Park, overlooking Coniston Water. Once owned by John Ruskin and sporadically a working farm until the 1950s, architects Sutherland Hussey were employed to transform the farmhouse and barns into an artists' residency base, opening in 2009 by Sir Nicholas Serota of Tate. The surrounding 12 acres of land has become a noted garden under the leadership of Head Gardener, artist and film maker Karen Guthrie. They have opened to the public under the National Garden Scheme and featured on BBC Gardener's World in 2023 (Episode 32). From 2012 - 2023 the organisation had an office at The Coniston Institute, a village hub originating in Ruskin's era, which they had helped redevelop. With the Ruskin Museum and Hayatsu Architects, they led the commissioning and making of a bespoke interpretation booth for the coppermines heritage trail, sited permanently outside the Institute. They also initiated the Institute's Honest Shop, an unstaffed retail unit designed by Endless Supply, and revived the Library, designed by Liam Gillick.

In 2020 the organisation was approached by the local community of Spark Bridge and Lowick to support the repurposing of a listed inn that had fallen into disrepair and had failed to find any buyer, The Farmer's Arms. With a fundraising campaign during the Covid 19 pandemic that attracted the support of local and international donors and investors they purchased the pub and re-opened in 2021 as a diversified cultural hub, offering - alongside food and drink - arts, crafts and gardening classes as well as talks, events and private hires. In 2024 the King's Coronation Orchard Fund supported a new community orchard on site, named Diana's Orchard, and the Royal Countryside Fund supported a new farm produce vending machine in the pub car park. An innovative youth project, Cafe Teen, has managed and run a Saturday cafe on site since 2025.

== Projects ==
Grizedale Arts' projects have included:

- A Fair Land (2016)
- The Coniston Institute Honest Shop (2013)
- Wantee (for the Turner Prize) by Laure Prouvost (2013)
- Gralsbaby D'Annunzioz (2009)
- Happy Stacking (2008)
- Agrifashionista (2008)
- Creative Egremont – A Public Art Strategy for Egremont. (2006–2008)
- Seven Samurai (2006) within the Japanese Echigo Tsumari Art Triennial. Also shown at the Galerie Lucy Mackintosh (2007)
- Romantic Detachment (2004) at the P.S. 1 Contemporary Art Center in New York
- The Festival of Lying (2000)

== Artists ==
Artists who have been involved with the Grizedale Arts programme include:

Anna Best, Jordan Baseman, David Blandy, Kathrin Böhm, Simon Poulter, Marcus Coates, Karen Guthrie & Nina Pope, Duncan McLaren, Olivia Plender, Lorrice Douglas, Juneau/projects, Kerry Stewart, Daniel Sturgis, Emily Wardill, Graeme Roger, Rob Kesseler, Ken Russell, Kevin Reid, Jen Lui, Tim Olden, Simon & Tom Bloor, Matt Stokes, Nathaniel Mellors, Bedwyr Williams, public works, myvillages.org, Mark Wallinger, Jeremy Deller, Tim Olden, Olaf Breuning, Mark Gubb, Pablo Bronstein, Bryan & Laura Davies, Phil Collins, Spartacus Chetwynd, Harold Offeh, Jay Yung, Dorian Moore, Alex Frost, Guest Room & Barnaby Hosking.

Notable successes among Grizedale alumni include Jeremy Deller and Mark Wallinger winning the Turner Prize in 2004 and 2007 respectively; Marcus Coates, Olivia Plender, Ryan Gander, Graham Gussin, Giorgio Sadotti and Jeremy Deller receiving Paul Hamlyn Awards; Bedwyr Williams was the Welsh artist in residence at the 2005 Venice Biennale; Mark Wallinger representing Great Britain in the 2001 Venice Biennale; Paul Rooney (artist) winning 2009's Northern Art Prize; Karen Guthrie and Nina Pope winning the Northern Art Prize in 2008.

== Artist links ==
- Jordan Baseman
- Somewhere – Karen Guthrie & Nina Pope
- Olaf Breuning
- Public Works
- myvillages.org
- Urbania Collective
- Dorian Moore
- GuestRoom
- Maria Benjamin
