= Anna Best =

British artist

Anna Best (born 1965, London) is a British artist whose work dates from the late 1980s to the present.

== Biography ==
After completing a BA (Hons) in Fine Art (First Class) in Coventry, Best established a cooperative artists’ studio in London and undertook several artist residencies, including Sculpture Space in New York.

In the mid-1990s, she attended the Rijksakademie in Amsterdam, where her tutors included Joan Jonas, Thom Puckey, and Judith Goddard. She subsequently held a solo exhibition, Texaco Love, at Casco Projects in Utrecht.

Between 1991 and 1997, Best co-founded Shave International Artist's Workshop in Somerset, UK, in collaboration with Triangle Arts.

On her return to London, Best exhibited in Summer Collection at the South London Gallery with A Real Pony Race for a Bridle (Burgess Park) reviewed by Anna Harding, and in Glean, curated by Naomi Siderfin at Beaconsfield with Visionhire (Lambeth Walk). Best was commissioned by Iwona Blaswick at Tate Modern (The Wedding Project, Borough Market), by The Photographer's Gallery (Occasional Sights), Camden Arts Centre (Mecca), and Grizedale Arts.

This work and other pieces consisted of large scale collaborative events; Best has said she was interested in the complexity and provisional nature of these processes. Her work was created in public space, and offsite—highly specific to time, place, and audience. Julieta Gonzalez appraises some of this work in Visible - where art leaves its own field and becomes visible as part of something else, Sternberg Press 2010. Alongside residencies, workshops, teaching, and projects abroad (Portugal, Croatia, Belgium, Poland, Venezuela, and Senegal), Best's practice at this time was primarily concerned with the Local: she worked with Danielle Arnaud, notably PHIL with the London Philharmonic orchestra, reviewed in Mute. She collaborated with composer Paul Whitty on Vauxhall Pleasure, including performances at Tate Britain and an exhibition at The Museum of Garden History.

Best's film and video work includes: Buddleia commissioned by Plymouth Arts Centre, Devon, 2007, with an essay by Lucy Reynolds and Plastic Water Stone, performance-screening at Almissa Festival, Croatia, 2019.

More recently, in Dorset, Best has hosted artists at The Mothership and developed her studio practice of drawing, sculpture, and writing, recently publishing Limestone Interruptions. She is currently working with partner Nick Berkeley on collaborative project 56:65, which will be on show at Gallery46 in October 2025. Best's work is held in archives at Tate Modern, The Photographers Gallery, the Live Art Development Agency, The South London Gallery Collection (Southwark Art Collection), and Beaconsfield Gallery, where it is currently (July 2025) on show in London.
