= Old Church of St Mary the Virgin, Preston Candover =

Coordinates: 51.1687°N 1.1380°W

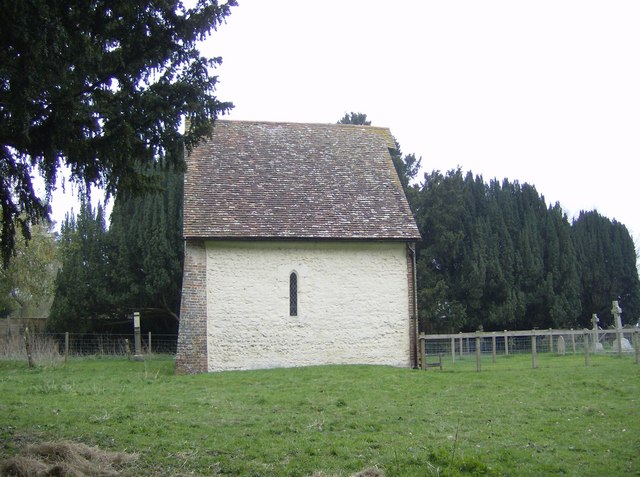
- Chancel of the Old Church of St Mary the Virgin, Preston Candover

- Location in Hampshire
- OS grid reference: SU 603 414
- Location: Preston Candover, Hampshire
- Country: England
- Denomination: Anglican
- Website: Churches Conservation Trust

History
- Founded: c. 1190
- Dedication: Virgin Mary

Architecture
- Functional status: Redundant
- Heritage designation: Grade II*
- Designated: 26 April 1957
- Architectural type: Church (chancel only)
- Style: Gothic
- Demolished: 1885 (other than the chancel)

Specifications
- Materials: Flint with stone dressings and brick quoins Roof tiled.

The Old Church of St Mary the Virgin is a redundant Anglican church in the village of Preston Candover, Hampshire, England. It is recorded in the National Heritage List for England as a designated Grade II* listed building, and is under the care of the Churches Conservation Trust. Only the chancel of the church has survived. It is situated towards the south of the village, on the northwest side of the B3046 road.

== History ==
The church was founded in about 1190. It was damaged in a fire in 1683 and rebuilt. At this time it is thought that it consisted of a long single cell with transepts, and a western weatherboarded bellcote with a pyramidal roof. A restoration was carried out in 1796. In 1831 the church was enlarged, providing 48 additional sittings. By 1885 the fabric of the church had deteriorated so much that, except for the chancel, it was demolished. At this time 60% of the pews were private. A new church with the same dedication was built nearer the centre of the village. The church's font and altar were transferred to the new church. The building is open daily.

== Architecture ==
=== Exterior ===
The chancel is constructed in flint with stone dressings and brick quoins. The roof is tiled. The west wall was added when the rest of the church was demolished and is in rubble. The building is almost square in plan. In the west wall is a round-headed doorway. The north wall contains a small lancet window dating from about 1190, and in the south wall is a two-light Perpendicular window and a blocked round-headed priest's door. The east window is round-headed with a single light. On the west gable is a wooden bellcote.

=== Interior ===
The floor contains some medieval tiles, and inscribed slabs and brasses dating from the 17th and 18th centuries. On the north and south walls are four marble memorials dating between 1729 and 1798. On the west wall is a framed painting recording the 1831 expansion of the church and two boards bearing the Ten Commandments. On the east wall are wall paintings that probably date from the 18th century. Also in the church is a small piscina, and altar rails dating from the 17th century.

== See also ==
- List of churches preserved by the Churches Conservation Trust in South East England
