= Abbey Gardens, Bakers Row =

British Community Garden

Coordinates: 51.5329°N 0.0036°E

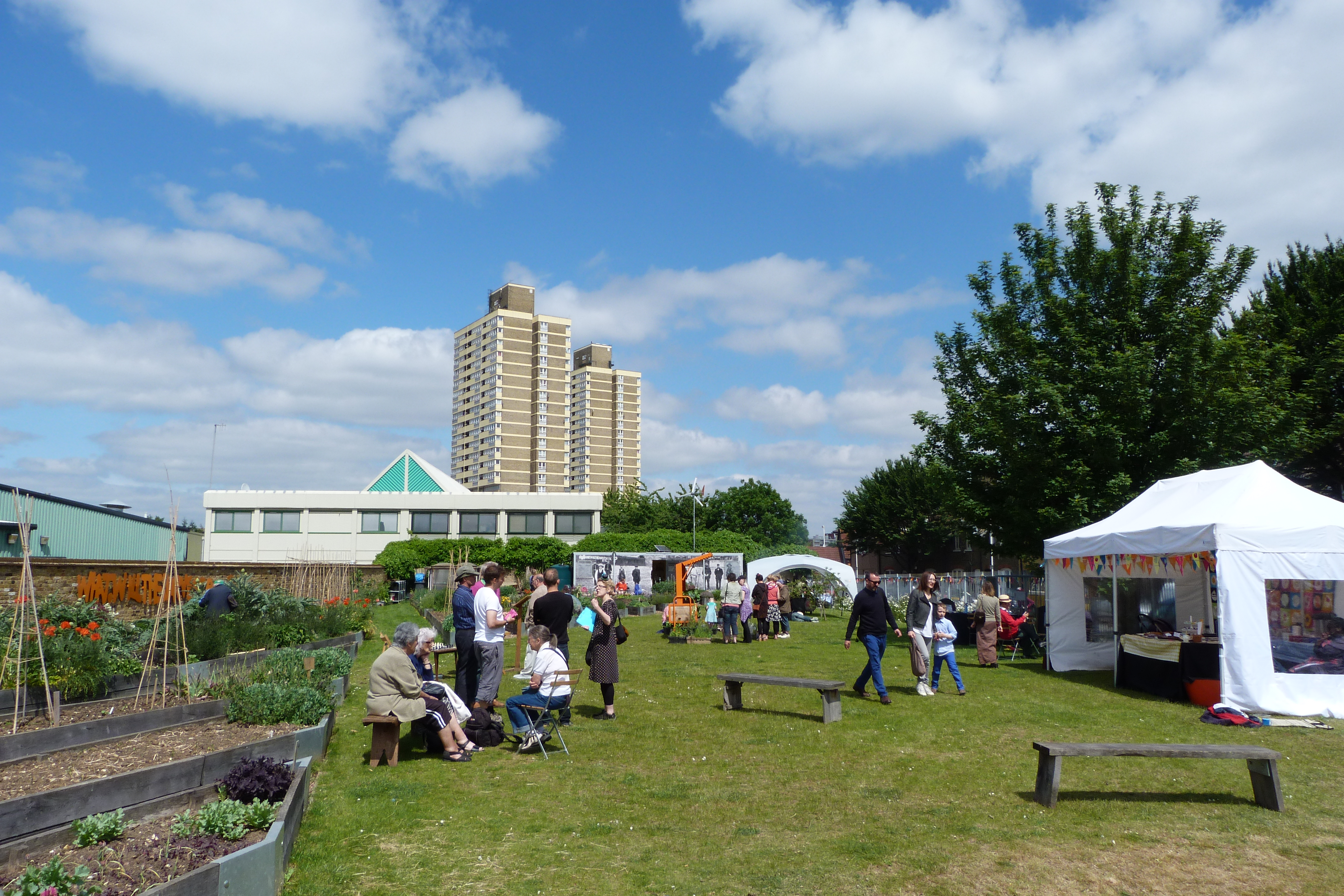
Abbey Gardens, Bakers Row, East London

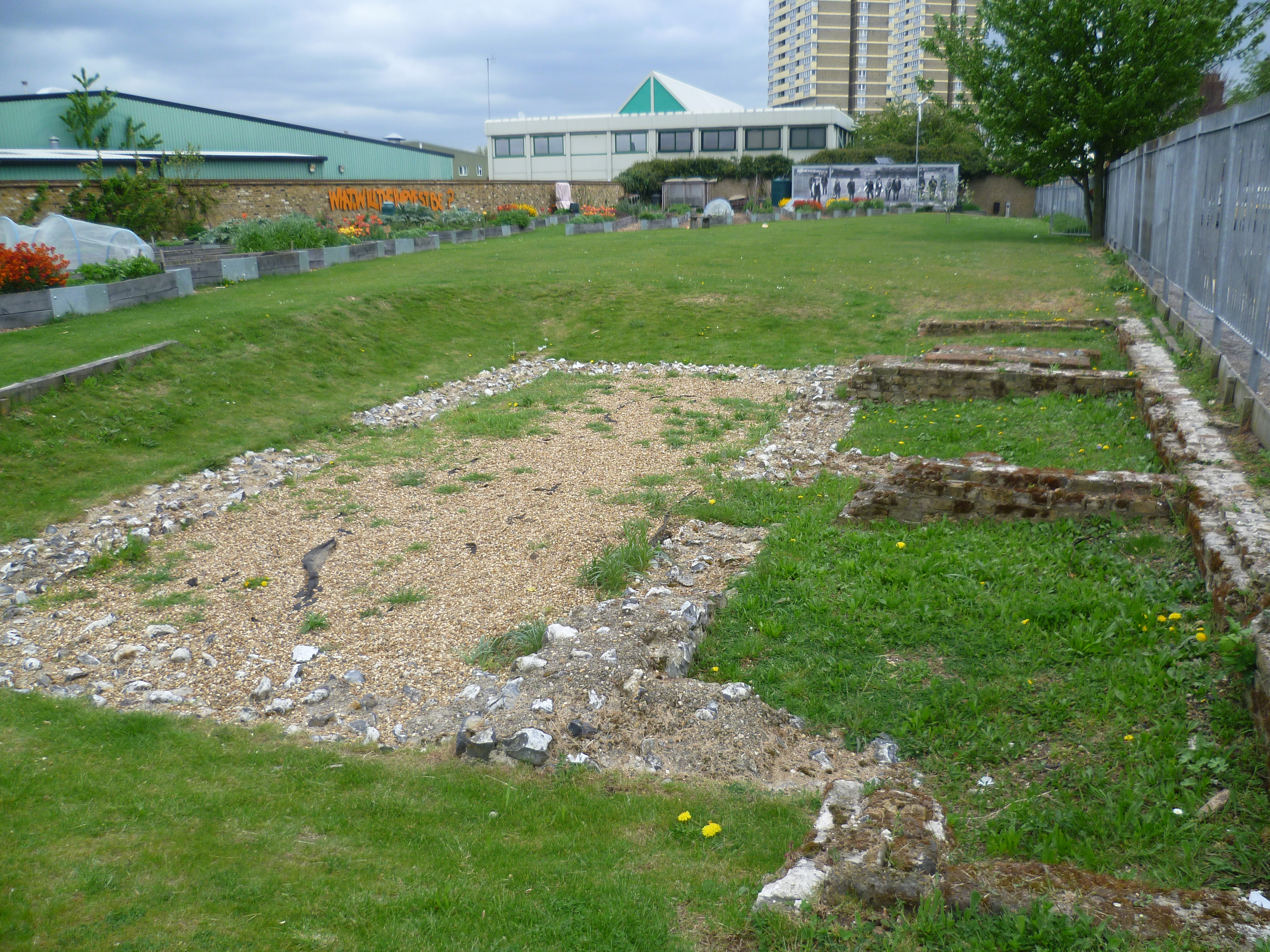
The site of the gatehouse

Abbey Gardens is a community garden in East London built on the site of a Scheduled Ancient Monument. The garden area was a row of cottages, and beneath is the remain of the gatehouse of the Stratford Langthorne Abbey. It is managed by a charity, The Friends of Abbey Gardens (Charity number 1158147).

The garden was created in 2008, by two artists, Nina Pope and Karen Guthrie.
