= Somewhere (artist collective) =

British art collective

Somewhere is a multi-disciplinary UK-based creative organisation founded in 2001 by the artists and film-makers Karen Guthrie (born 1970) and Nina Pope (born 1968).

After studying together at Edinburgh College of Art, Pope and Guthrie completed MAs in London and began collaborating as artists in 1995, with their installation "Somewhere Over the TV" at the Collective Gallery in Edinburgh, followed by their live online travelogue "A Hypertext Journal" in March 1996.

In 2007, Guthrie and Pope won the first Northern Art Prize.

In 2005, Somewhere co-produced Pope and Guthrie's first feature film, Bata-ville: We are not afraid of the future, which was screened at Tate Britain. The film is in the form of a documentary travelogue.Bata-ville has been shown in many festivals and art venues.
