= Lawson Park =

Artists' colony, Lake District, UK

Coordinates: 54.3468°N 3.0519°W

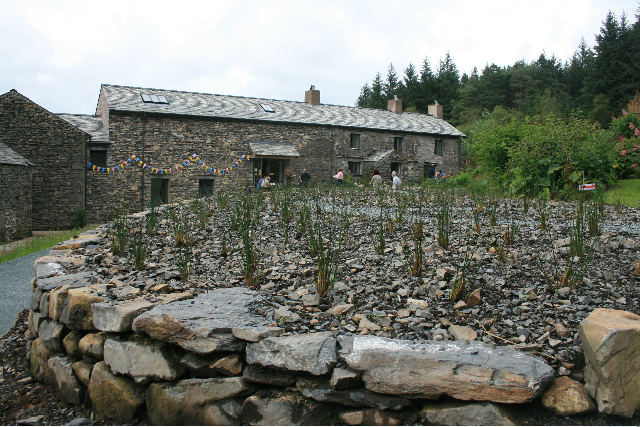
Lawson Park 2009

Lawson Park is a remote English Lake District hillfarm, leased by Grizedale Arts (a contemporary art commissioner) from Forestry England. It is situated opposite the village of Coniston overlooking Coniston Water, behind Brantwood. A major RIBA Award-winning refurbishment by architects Sutherland Hussey in 2007/8/9 saw the farm transformed into an artists' residency and office base for Grizedale Arts. It now offers live/work residencies to contemporary artists and hosts volunteers, events and conferences periodically.

Grizedale Arts director Adam Sutherland has furnished the building with a notable working collection of works by British designers and manufacturers from 1820 to the present day. Circa 15 acres (61,000 m^{2}) of land around Lawson Park is being returned to productive use as a smallholding, and the extensive gardens, designed by artist & film-maker Karen Guthrie, are open to the public regularly.

== History ==
The farm was first recorded under the ownership of the Cistercian Furness Abbey (Barrow-in-Furness) in the 13th century, when it was used as a base for charcoal-burning. After deforestation of the surrounding land in the late medieval period, the farm was used by a succession of tenant sheep-farmers. In the late 19th century Victorian polymath John Ruskin - who lived in nearby Brantwood - purchased the farmhouse and land. After Ruskin's death the farm was tenanted by various families until the Taylforth family ended farming in the 1950s. The buildings were used as a student hostel until the late 1980s.
