= Ellisfield =

Village and parish in Hampshire, England

Coordinates: 51.2126°N 1.0903°W

- Location within Hampshire
- Population: 272 (2011 Census)
- District: Basingstoke & Deane
- Shire county: Hampshire
- Region: South East
- Country: England
- Sovereign state: United Kingdom
- Post town: BASINGSTOKE
- Postcode district: RG25
- Dialling code: 01256
- Police: Hampshire and Isle of Wight
- Fire: Hampshire and Isle of Wight
- Ambulance: South Central
- UK Parliament: North East Hampshire

Ellisfield is a village in the Basingstoke and Deane district of Hampshire, England. It lies approximately 4 miles (6.4 km) south of Basingstoke on the other side of the M3 motorway from the town. As a parish it is grouped together with Cliddesden, Dummer and Farleigh Wallop.

== History ==
The name Ellisfield derives from the Old English word ielfsanfeld, meaning open land of Iellfsa. At the time of the Domesday Survey (1086) Ellisfield was part of the estate of the Bishop of Bayeux. It was held by Hugh de Port and later the St Johns. The manor was held by a favourite of Henry VIII, Sir William Sandys, in 1496. He later became Lord Chancellor and was created Baron Sandys. In 1657, the fifth Lord Sandys served with Charles I at the Battle of Cheriton. The property was sold and divided, to be reformed in 1789 by John Wallop, Earl of Portsmouth.

== Demography ==
Ellisfield has a population of approximately 250 people.

== Landmarks ==
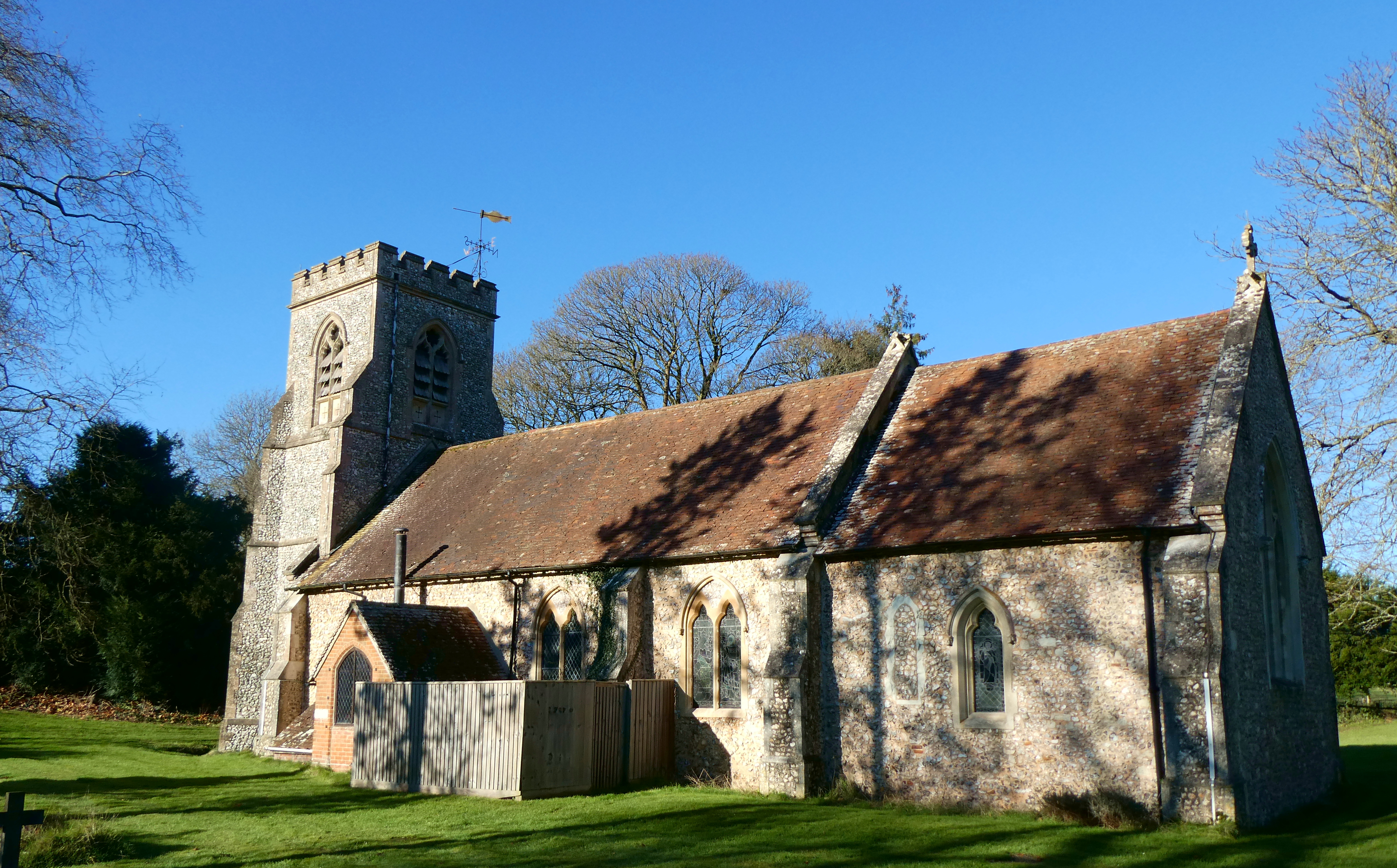
The Church of England parish church of St. Martin at Ellisfield, Hampshire, England is C13 with later additions and renovations and a C19 tower with five bells. November 2024.

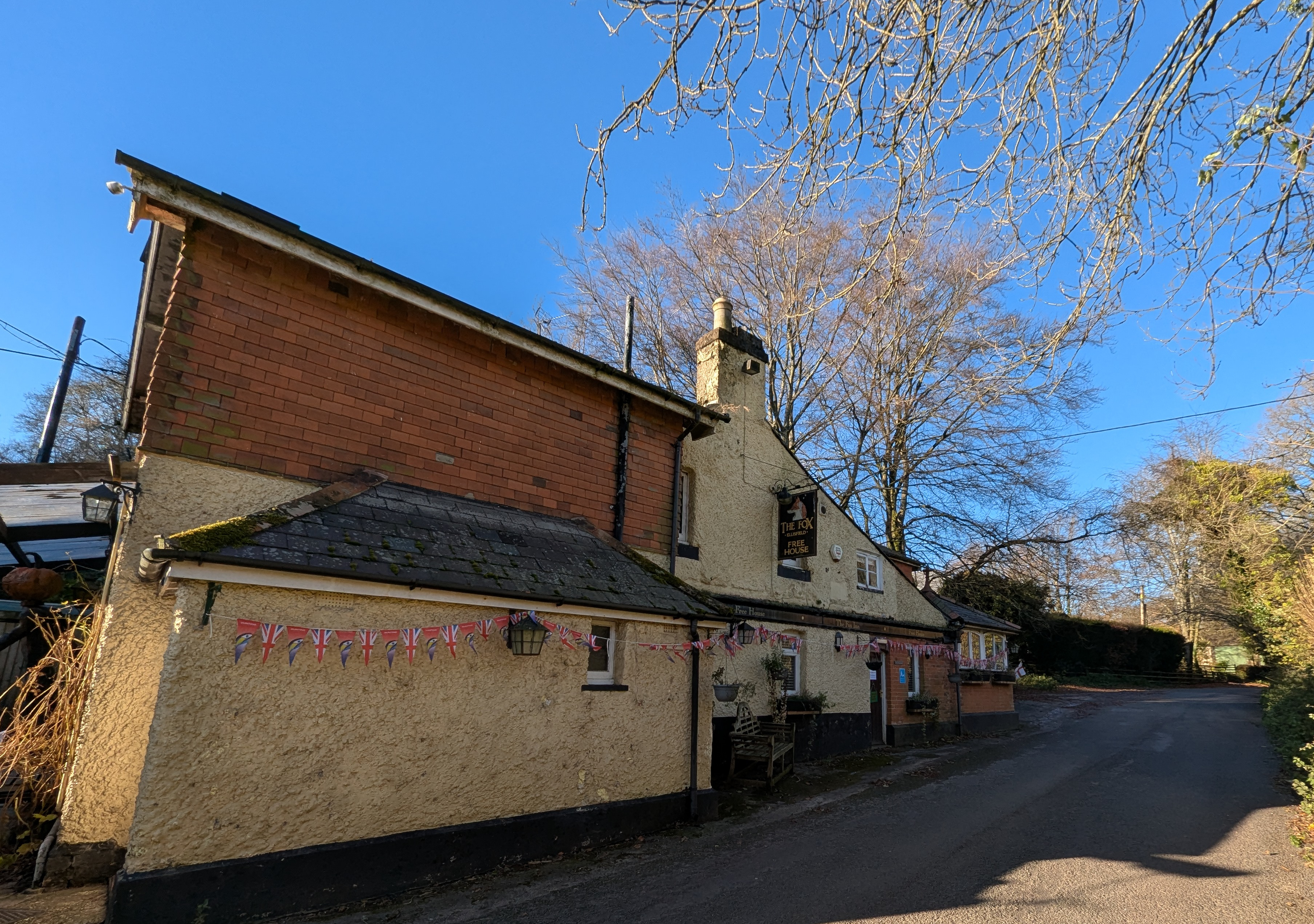
The Fox pub at Ellisfield, Hampshire, England. November 2024.

There is a pub, The Fox ( a free house that serves food), and a church, St Martin's, which has 13th-century origins.

There is no school or local shop, with primary-age children being educated usually in either Preston Candover or Cliddesden village schools. There are 12 listed properties in the village, including the church, which is Grade-II* listed.

Part of Ellisfield has been designated as a conservation area by Basingstoke & Deane Borough Council. The conservation area comprises four of the settlements that lead to the creation of the village: Merritt's Farm, Ellisfield Manor, The Old Manor and Ellisfield Green. All are joined by a series of lanes running east–west, linking the A339 with the B3046. Part of this route formed the Harrow Way, an ancient trackway across Southern England from Dover to Stonehenge and then Cornwall. The remainder of the village lies outside the Conservation Area, further south along Green Lane, College Lane and Axford Road.

Affordable housing has been built outside of the conservation area at Farrier's Field on land donated by the Earl of Portsmouth (who owns the Farleigh Estate).
