= Whitchurch Silk Mill =

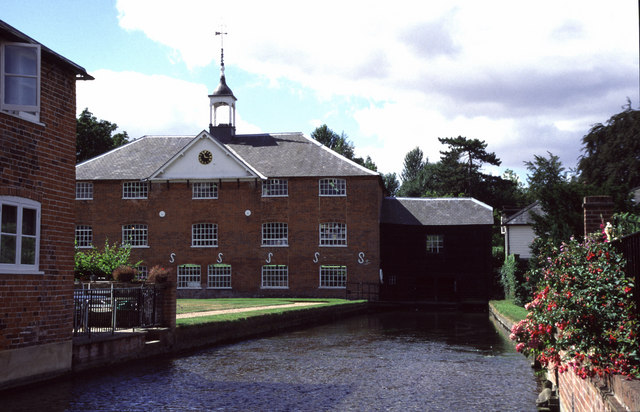

- Location within Hampshire
- 51°13′39″N 1°20′23″W
- Type: Fulling mill Silk mill
- Location: Whitchurch
- OS grid reference: SU4625247901

History
- Built: 1800

Site notes
- Area: Hampshire
- Owner: Hampshire Buildings Preservation Trust

Listed Building – Grade II*
- Official name: Whitchurch Silk Mill
- Designated: 10 Jan 1953
- Reference no.: 1092645

Whitchurch Silk Mill is a watermill on the River Test, located in the town of Whitchurch, Hampshire, England. It is a Grade II* listed building

== History ==
The mill was constructed in 1800 by Henry Hayter on a plot of land called Frog Island. The mill is probably on the same site as one of the four mills recorded in the Domesday Book. Originally it was a fulling mill (part of the finishing process of cloth weaving). Some years later, in 1817, it was bought by William Madick who changed its operation to throw silk. In 1844 it was acquired by Alexander Bannerman and John Spencer, merchants of Manchester. William Chappell, the manager of the mill, purchased it from them in 1846. At this time the mill employed 108 staff, including 39 children under the age of 13. By 1866 the mill had passed into the ownership of the Hide family with whom it remained until the death of James Hide in 1955. During this time, the mill wove silk for Burberry, then based in nearby Basingstoke, who used it as coloured linings for their raincoats. It ultimately passed to Ede and Ravenscroft who operated it up to 1985, producing legal and academic gowns. It was then acquired by the Hampshire Buildings Preservation Trust who, after renovation works, opened it to the public in 1990.

In December 2012, the Trustees recommenced silk production.

== Ownership and management ==
The building is owned by the Hampshire Buildings Preservation Trust and leased to a dedicated trust, the Whitchurch Silk Mill Trust, to ensure preservation. The trust operates as a registered charity and two registered companies.

The Whitchurch Silk Mill states on the UK Charity Commission website:

"Whitchurch Silk Mill Trust weaves silk on Victorian machinery in the Georgian watermill of Whitchurch Silk Mill, Hampshire. The mill is open to the public who come from across the UK and abroad. The charity educates visitors about silk, retains and develops the skills of silk weaving and restores its historic machinery."

Local organisations, including the Town Council, and the public offered support to the Silk Mill so that weaving activity was restored to the Mill.

== Machinery ==
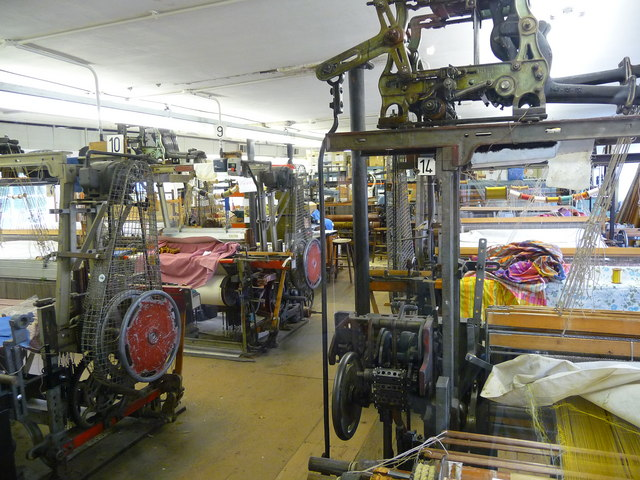
Weaving machines

The mill was powered by a low breastshot water wheel, 5 ft 6 in (1.68 m) in diameter driving the machinery through line shafting. There are currently 15 looms in total, 10 Tappet looms dating to 1890–1932, 3 Dobby looms dating to the 1950s and 2 1960s Hattersley looms acquired in 1972. These days the looms are powered by individual electric motors. In addition there is a warping mill and winding frames also dating from the 1890s.
