= Lucy Mackintosh Gallery =

Defunct art gallery in Lausanne, Switzerland

Coordinates: 46.5133°N 6.6325°E

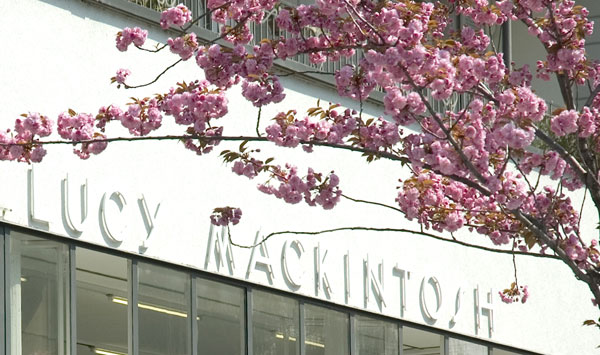
View of the front of the Lucy Mackintosh Gallery

The Lucy Mackintosh gallery was a commercial contemporary art space located in Lausanne, Switzerland between 2004 and 2013. It exhibited Swiss and international contemporary art and artists. The gallery also regularly invited designers to present their work.

== History ==
The Lucy Mackintosh gallery opened in Lausanne in 2004 in premises previously occupied by the EPFL architecture department. The architecture studio Jean-Gilles Décosterd & Philippe Rahm designed the exhibition space using the concept of the "white canvas" for the refurbishing of the gallery. Gallery Director Cyril Veillon said, "The architect's response to an existing space and the brief for a contemporary art gallery was to create territories using thermal distortions rather than partitions. Elaborate plumbing runs through the main space, whose temperature can be attenuated according to the gallery function. "

In 2005, the gallery was featured in the Can Buildings Curate exhibition by Newbetter and the Architectural Association School of Architecture for its space design. The project closed its doors in 2013.

== Projects ==
Along with exhibitions of artists represented by the gallery, group shows and collaborative projects are presented with national institutions or independent curators.

- News from Nowhere (2005) curated by Justin Hibbs.
- Studies for the Consumption (2005) for the festival Les Urbaines in Lausanne with Perfektron
- Eau Sauvage (2006) curated by Juan Bolivar, Marco Costantini and Jean-Luc Manz.
- Eau Sauvage part II was presented in 2007 at the Fieldgate Gallery in London
- Can Buildings Curate (2006) curated by Newbetter, in collaboration with the Architectural Association, London.
- The Return of the Seven Samurai (2007) with Grizedale Arts.
- Something Material Everything Immaterial (2007) with Newbetter and the British Council.
- Working Space II (2008) curated by David Ben White and Justin Hibbs, originated from the Arts Gallery at the University of the Arts London.
- Grands Paysages d'Europe / Wide European Landscape (2009) curated by Lorette Coen.
- The Tenth Sentiment (2011) an art installation by Ryota Kuwakubo, work awarded a prize of excellence at the 14th Japan Media Arts Festival.
