= Chilton Candover =

Village in Hampshire, England

Coordinates: 51.157760°N 1.154273°W

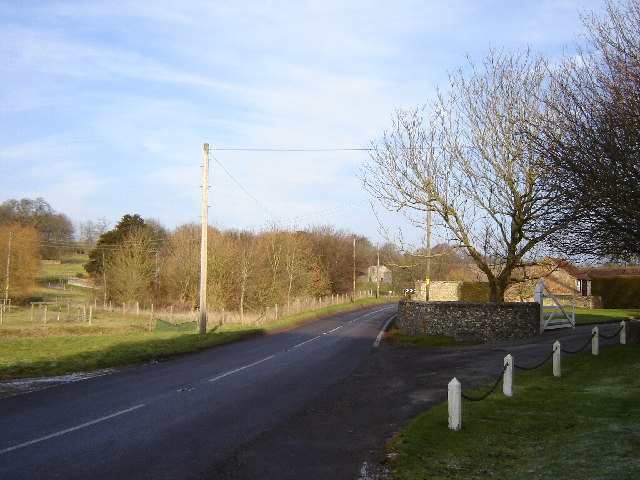

- Location within Hampshire
- Population: 27
- OS grid reference: SU5924140174
- Civil parish: Candovers
- District: Basingstoke and Deane
- Shire county: Hampshire
- Region: South East
- Country: England
- Sovereign state: United Kingdom
- Post town: ALRESFORD
- Postcode district: SO24
- Dialling code: 01962
- Police: Hampshire and Isle of Wight
- Fire: Hampshire and Isle of Wight
- Ambulance: South Central
- UK Parliament: Winchester

Chilton Candover is a village and former civil parish, now in the parish of Candovers, in the Basingstoke and Deane district, in the county of Hampshire, England. It has an acreage of 1,451 acres (5.87 km^{2}) and sits in the valley of the River Alre. The village is situated on the main road from Basingstoke to Winchester, and consists of a few scattered houses built of brick and roofed with slate, thatch and tiles. To the north lies an underground churchyard enclosed by a flint stone wall, now abandoned and overgrown with weeds. In 1931 the parish had a population of 68.

Its nearest town is New Alresford, 5.5 miles (8.9 km) away from the village. Its nearest railway station is the restored Watercress Line, at New Alresford.

== History ==
A village had existed in Chilton Candover since the Middle Ages, however it was demolished in 1582, with the population being dispersed and the land being enclosed for grazing sheep. As of 2005, the village contained a small number of cottages and farmhouses.

== Governance ==
The village of Chilton Candover is part of the Upton Grey and the Candovers ward of Basingstoke and Deane borough council. The borough council is a Non-metropolitan district of Hampshire County Council. On 1 April 1932 the parish was abolished to form "Candovers".

== Landmarks ==
The Norman crypt of St. Nicholas church, partially buried under the ground, remains visible as a landmark. The church was built in 1100, was re-built in the 14th century and was demolished in 1878. An excavation in 1927 revealed the site. The village also contains what is believed to be the longest avenue of yew trees in England.

== See also ==
- Brown Candover
- Preston Candover
