= Whitchurch, Hampshire =

Town in Hampshire, England

Coordinates: 51.23°N 1.34°W

Whitchurch
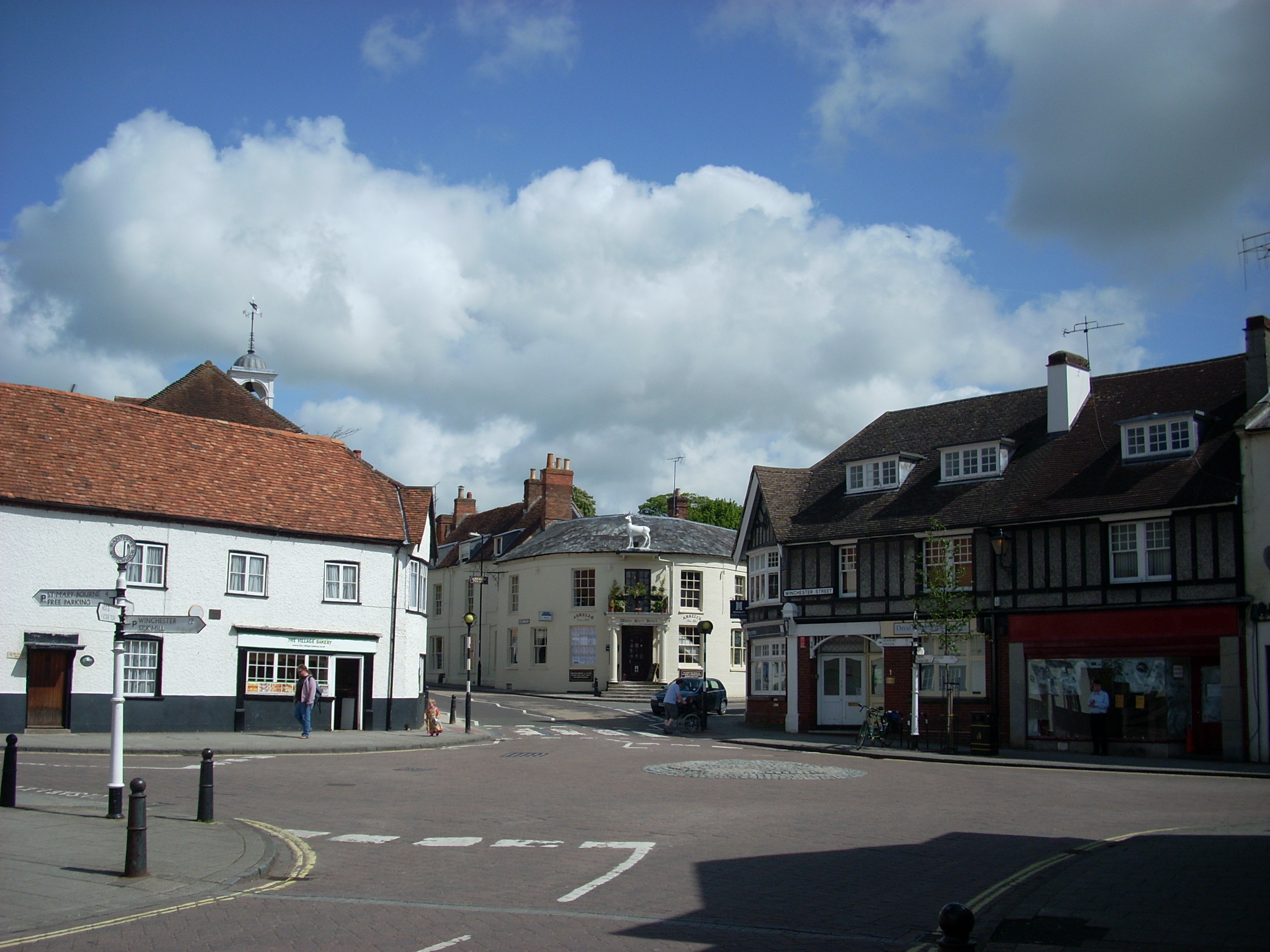
- Town Centre of Whitchurch

- Location within Hampshire
- Population: 7,198 (2018 Census)
- OS grid reference: SU465480
- District: Basingstoke and Deane
- Shire county: Hampshire
- Region: South East
- Country: England
- Sovereign state: United Kingdom
- Post town: WHITCHURCH
- Postcode district: RG28
- Dialling code: 01256
- Police: Hampshire and Isle of Wight
- Fire: Hampshire and Isle of Wight
- Ambulance: South Central
- UK Parliament: North West Hampshire
- Website: http://whitchurch.org.uk

Whitchurch is a market town in the borough of Basingstoke and Deane in Hampshire, England. It is on the River Test, 13 miles (21 km) south of Newbury, Berkshire, 12 miles (19 km) north of Winchester, 8 miles (13 km) east of Andover and 12 miles (19 km) west of Basingstoke. Much of the town is a Conservation Area. Because of the amount of wildlife in and near the River Test, its course and banks are designated as Site of Special Scientific Interest. Whitchurch markets itself as a gateway to the North Wessex Downs National Landscape; it is the third largest of Britain's National Landscapes.

The West of England Main Line links the town's railway station to London, and two main roads bypass the town (the A34, a major north–south route, and the A303, a major east–west route.

== History ==
=== Earliest origins ===
The name is Anglo Saxon in origin, and means 'white church', although there is evidence of occupation from the Iron Age, archaeological excavations having uncovered Roman and Iron Age pottery, tools and skeletal remains. In October 1987, members of the Andover Metal Detecting Club discovered a hoard of Late Iron Age coins, the Whitchurch Hoard, comprising 34 Gallo-Belgic E gold staters, and 108 British B (or, Chute,) gold staters. The earliest written record of Whitchurch dates from 909 AD in a charter by which King Edward the Elder confirmed the manor of Whitchurch to the monks of Winchester as England recovered from the Viking onslaught of the previous fifty years. It next appears in the Domesday Book of 1086. This records the name as 'Witcerce', occupying 6,100 acres (25 km^{2}) in the 'Hundred of Evingar' and also records that Witcerce was 'owned' by the monks at Winchester. Another theory on the origin of the name is that it means "Place of Proclamation". In parts of the north of England we see it reflected in Whit Walks, with Roman Catholics and Protestants choosing different days over the Whit Period for their Whit Walks. Whitchurch is well placed, being at the crossroads for north–south, east–west travellers.

=== 13th century ===
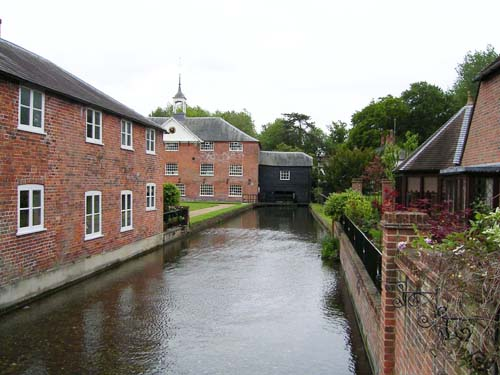
Looking from the town along the River Test towards the Whitchurch Silk Mill

By 1241, it was known as Witcherche and was becoming prosperous, holding a market on Mondays in the market place. This was a vital feature of medieval society, and produce such as butter, eggs, fruit and livestock were brought in for sale from the outlying farms and villages.

Witcherche received a royal charter in 1285, having become a borough in 1284. The land ownership had by now passed to a form of tenure known as a burgage. As a borough, it was governed by a Court Leet. Meetings were held in the village hall each year, in October, to elect a mayor and burgesses. Witcherche's prosperity was again on the rise due to its widespread sheep farming, the wool being a valuable commodity at the time.

The River Test provided the power for at least four watermills, located every half-mile along the river through the town. The Town Mill was the source of power for milling corn, and other mills were used for finishing wool, weaving silk and dressing cloth. Only Whitchurch Silk Mill survives, the others having been converted into residential dwellings. The Silk Mill is a popular visitor attraction where silk is still produced after a very small interruption in 2012.

=== 16th century ===
When Henry VIII died in 1547 his nine-year-old son, Edward VI, inherited the throne. Under Thomas Cranmer, the Archbishop of Canterbury, and Edward Seymour the Lord Protector, England became more Protestant, and the people of Whitchurch were persecuted for their religious beliefs for six years until the death of Edward and the succession of Mary.

Also during the 16th century, under the reign of Elizabeth the town had become large and prosperous enough to send its first two members to Parliament in 1586. Until 1832, it was known as a Rotten Borough, as the members were nominated by an absent landlord.

=== 18th century ===
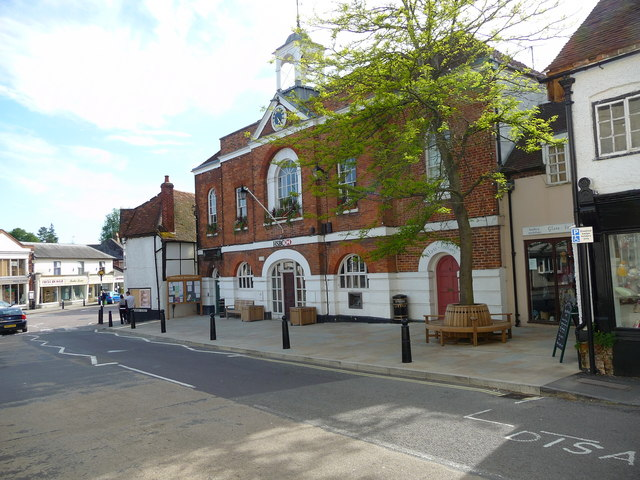
Whitchurch Town Hall

In 1712, Henri de Portal, a Huguenot refugee from France, established a paper mill at Bere Mill in Whitchurch, producing exceptionally hard and close-textured paper. The quality of the paper was considered so high that within twelve years, Portal was supplying the Bank of England, a tradition that still continues. Portal eventually naturalised to English nationality, and established a second mill at Laverstoke; in more recent times the business moved to neighbouring Overton, where it is still based today. He died in 1747, and is buried at All Hallows, Whitchurch. Whitchurch Town Hall was completed in 1791.

=== 19th century ===
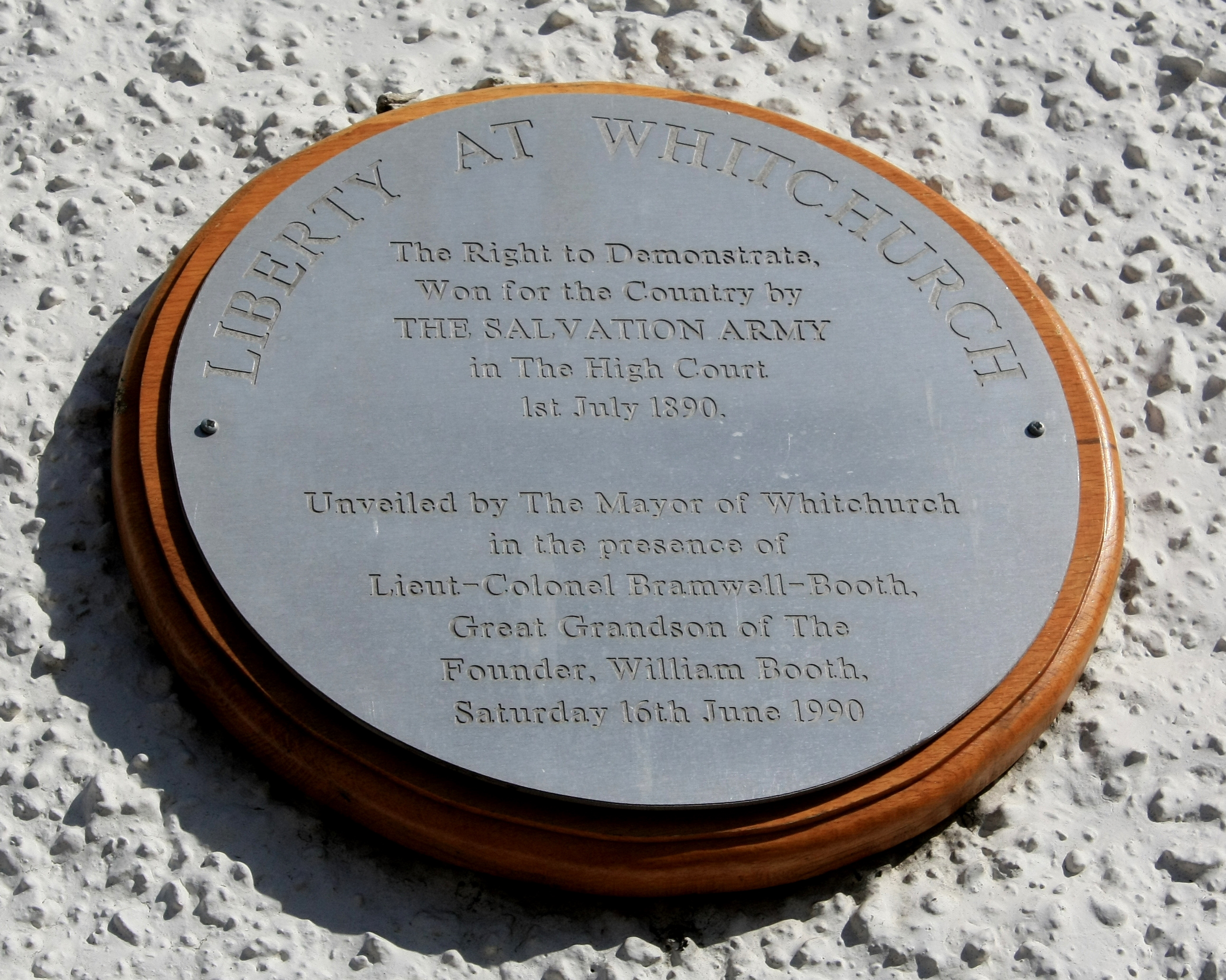
Plaque in The Square, commemorating liberty at Whitchurch won by The Salvation Army in 1890.

In 1888, Charles Denning and Clara Thomas set up home in Whitchurch, where Clara's father had purchased two houses for them in Newbury Street. Here Charles established a drapery business. It was also here that one of their children, Alfred Thompson or "Tom", grew up. He later became a renowned judge Lord Denning, Master of the Rolls. The house in Newbury Street is today marked with a commemorative plaque.

Towards the end of the 19th century, the Salvation Army and its open-air services were the dominant talking point. They maintained that they had a right to hold these services but were prosecuted for obstructing the highways and causing a disturbance. The conviction in 1889 of one group, and their subsequent treatment by the authorities, led to demonstrations. In October 1889, 1000 Salvationists demonstrated in the Town Square at Whitchurch. They were charged with riot, unlawful assembly and rout, and the Salvationists applied for the case to be heard in the High Court of Justice. The court found in their favour and set down laws granting the public the right to hold orderly public demonstrations.

=== 21st century ===
During the night of 7 February 2018, Henri de Portal's former paper mill, Bere Mill, which had been converted into a family home, was largely destroyed by a major fire. The mill house was fully restored in 2020.

== All Hallows' Church ==
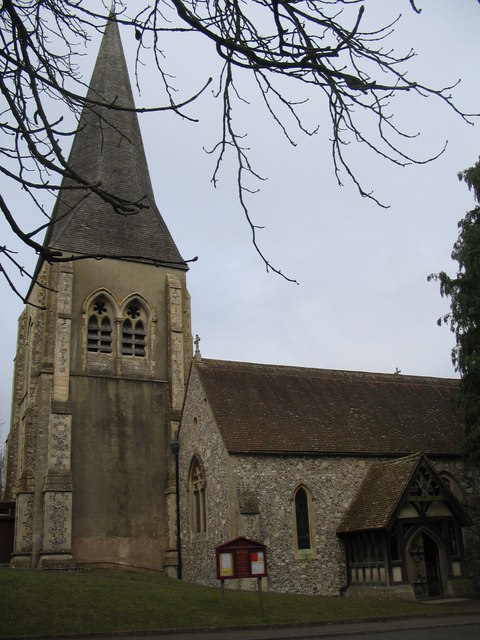
All Hallows' Church

The Saxon church was the original "white church", because it was built of limestone or chalk. The church and all its property were given by Henry de Blois in 1132 to St Cross Hospital in Winchester and the gift was confirmed by Richard I in 1189.

Little is known about the earlier Saxon structure because its Norman lords built a more imposing successor which is the basis of the present parish church of All Hallows. One Saxon remnant is the grave cover of Frithburga. The first stage was completed in about 1190 when the three western bays on the south side of the nave were added. A north aisle was added in the 15th century. The tower was re-built in 1716 but still features the original oak stair turret. The whole church was largely re-built in 1866 and the square Norman tower was capped by a Gothic Revival spire.

It is a Grade II* listed building and the oldest remaining structure in the town. All Hallows is also widely known for its 3-manual pipe organ with 41 stops dating from 1935, and a peal of 10 bells in the tower. The earliest of the six bells in the tower is of 15th-century origin and the others were gifts made in the 17th and 18th centuries. The bells were cast in a field belonging to a farm in Wood Street, now called Bell Street. The spire of All Hallows weighs 500 tons and is held in place by its own weight.

== Transport and infrastructure ==
=== Present day ===
Whitchurch is served by a combination of road, rail and bus networks that connect the town to nearby regional centres and London.

The B3400 road runs through the town, providing a direct route between Basingstoke and Andover. The A34 trunk road lies a short distance to the west and provides north–south connectivity between Southampton, Oxford and the Midlands. The A303 trunk road lies 4 miles to the south and provides east-west connectivity between Basingstoke and Exeter.

Bus services are operated primarily by Stagecoach South, including route 76 between Andover and Basingstoke via Whitchurch and Overton, and route 86 between Winchester and Whitchurch via South Wonston and Sutton Scotney.

Whitchurch railway station is situated at the northern edge of the town on the West of England Main Line and is served by South Western Railway, with direct services eastbound to London Waterloo and westbound to Exeter St Davids. Services typically operate at an approximate hourly frequency in each direction, with additional peak services. Whitchurch is in the outer commuter belt of London with services typically taking 1 hour to capital.

The town is also served by a network of public footpaths and recreational routes.

=== History ===
Whitchurch developed at the junction of several historic routes. The Victoria County History describes the town as lying at the meeting point of the London to Andover and Newbury to Winchester roads, with the market place forming the centre from which these routes diverged.

Local heritage sources describe London Street as the old Exeter Road out of London, and note that it was a busy coach road until the arrival of the railways in the mid-19th century. The convergence of routes contributed to Whitchurch’s development as a coaching and trading centre, supported by inns, markets and the movement of goods.

The railway reached Whitchurch in 1854 with the opening of the line between Basingstoke and Salisbury by the London and South Western Railway. Its arrival formed part of the wider expansion of the rail network during the Victorian period and significantly improved connections to London and the South West. The railway facilitated the transport of goods, including paper from the town’s mills and agricultural produce from the surrounding countryside.

A second station, Whitchurch Town, was later opened closer to the town centre on the Didcot, Newbury and Southampton Railway. It closed in 1960 as part of wider mid-20th-century railway rationalisation. The present station remains the town’s principal rail connection.

== Education ==
Testbourne Community School is a foundation school and was rated as "outstanding" in November 2010 by Ofsted. It has had performing arts specialist status since 2005 and educates around 1000 students aged 11–16.

Whitchurch Church of England Primary School serves the younger students in the town and its surrounding areas. It was rated in January 2011 as "good" with a number of "outstanding" features, by OFSTED. The headteacher, Sarah Peters, started in April 2008, and left in 2014. Zoe Newton, the deputy headteacher, acted as headmistress until September 2015. The current headteacher is Kate Steven.

The nearest third-level educational institution is the University of Winchester, 12.5 miles (20.1 km) to the south.

== Leisure and sport ==
Whitchurch has a Non-League football club Whitchurch United F.C., which plays at Longmeadow. Also at the Longmeadow sports facility is a Bowls club with indoor and outdoor pitches, and a Squash club with 2 squash courts. Whitchurch also has two Cricket teams playing at the local Cricket Ground (Parsonage Meadow) where skipper Simon Ralph and his band of merry little cricketing men try to avoid relegation for the second year in a row.

As well as the thriving amateur theatre group called WADS, which was established in 1958, there is also an annual beer festival held at the Longmeadow Sports and Social Club, this is run by the North Hampshire branch of the Campaign for Real Ale. Being positioned on the Southern edge of the North Wessex Downs Area of Outstanding Natural Beauty as well as at the junction of several river valleys, Whitchurch has many opportunities for cycling, both strenuous and sedate, on-road and off. Popular cycle routes include over to the Bourne Valley, the Hampshire County Council Off-Road Mountainbike loop, and down the Test Valley to Longparish.

There is a BMX cycle track and a 'Sk8' board area in Daniel Park, which together with its adjoining open space next to the primary school, has been put forward as a Queen Elizabeth II field in the hope of protecting it forever.

The Whitchurch Town Council maintains a couple of children's playgrounds: one in Kingsley Park, and the other at the bottom of Alliston Way between the schools. Other play areas are at Caesar's Way and Park View.

== Environment ==
The River Test throughout the town, including its various branches and banks, is a Site of Special Scientific Interest.

Much of the land to the south of the town centre is old water meadow. One site is administered by Whitchurch Millennium Green Trust, a registered charity. This has an old dam used for flooding the meadow in the past and a sluice and wooden sheep dip hundreds of years old. Its ponds have viewing platforms. The old maps show how it was fed by springs.

Whitchurch is located near the North Wessex Downs National Landscape; which features a mix of rolling chalk hills, woodland and pasture. A National Landscape is a designated exceptional landscape whose distinctive character and natural beauty are precious enough to be safeguarded in the national interest. The North Wessex Downs make up the third largest of Britain's National Landscapes.

== First Place Winner in BT Competition ==
Whitchurch was ranked first in the BT "Race to Infinity" competition that finished on 31 December 2010. The win meant that the residents served from the exchange (01256-89 prefix) would be one of the first ten rural areas in Britain to be upgraded to fibre-optic technology. The hope was that this would bring faster Internet speeds sooner to residences, businesses, schools and doctors both in the town itself and to its surrounding villages and the rural communities in-between.

== Notable people ==
- Richard Adams, the author of Watership Down and The Plague Dogs, lived in Whitchurch. Watership Down is a real location, about 6 miles NNE of the town.
- Carl Barât of the Libertines and Dirty Pretty Things was brought up in the town
- Brian Clifton, professional footballer
- Charles I, later beheaded at Whitehall, stayed with the Brooke family of Whitchurch in 1644. The house, which still stands today opposite All Hallows' Church, is named Kings Lodge, presumably after its regal guest.
- John Haime (1708 –1784), Methodist preacher.
- Thomas Crompton, MP for Whitchurch in 1601
- Lord Denning, English Judge and Master of the Rolls
- James Robertson Justice, the actor, lived in Whitchurch. Sadly, his son, also called James, died in Whitchurch by drowning in the River Test in 1948.
- John Hall (1765–1836) millwright, engineer and entrepreneur - born in Whitchurch
- Paul Sartin, the folk musician of Bellowhead fame, lived in the town for two decades.
- Actor Leslie Schofield, who has a long list of acting credits to his name, most notably as Chief Bast in Star Wars Episode IV, Jeff Healy in EastEnders and a French Detective in Chucklevision, lived in Whitchurch.
- Restoration dramatist William Wycherley was baptised at Whitchurch on 8 April 1641.
