= Brown Candover =

Village and parish in Hampshire, England

Coordinates: 51.14°N 01.18°W

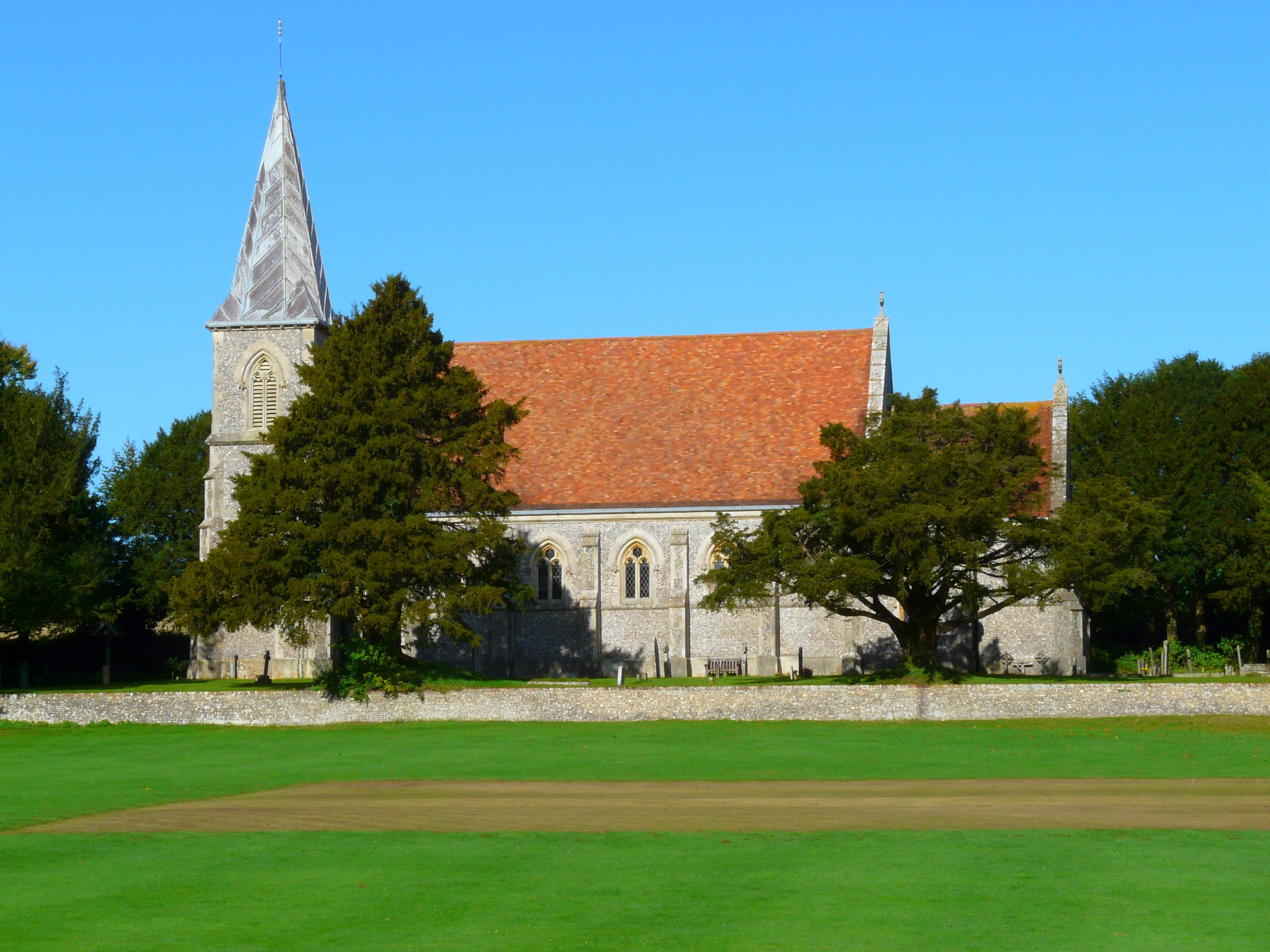
- St. Peter's Parish Church

- Location within Hampshire
- Population: 236 (2011 Census)
- OS grid reference: SU5739
- Civil parish: Candovers
- District: Basingstoke and Deane
- Shire county: Hampshire
- Region: South East
- Country: England
- Sovereign state: United Kingdom
- Post town: Alresford
- Postcode district: SO24
- Police: Hampshire and Isle of Wight
- Fire: Hampshire and Isle of Wight
- Ambulance: South Central

Brown Candover is a village and former civil parish, now in the parish of Candovers, in the Basingstoke and Deane district, in the county of Hampshire, England. The village belongs to the parish of the Candovers and its nearest town is New Alresford, 5 miles (8.0 km) away from the village. In 1931 the parish had a population of 131.

== Governance ==
The village of Brown Candover is part of the Upton Grey and the Candovers ward of Basingstoke and Deane borough council. The borough council is a Non-metropolitan district of Hampshire County Council. On 1 April 1932 the parish was abolished to form "Candovers".

== Geography ==
Brown Candover is on the B3046 road, north of Alresford. Along with Chilton Candover and Preston Candover it forms The Candovers, named after the stream that runs through the valley. The Wayfarer's Walk passes through the village.

== Culture and community ==
The village has a village hall and a cricket pitch. As of 2005, the village held an annual summer fête and village barbecue.

== Religious sites ==
The village has a church, St. Peter's, which was built in 1845.

== See also ==
- Chilton Candover
- Preston Candover
