= Preston Candover =

Village and parish in Hampshire, England

Coordinates: 51.172°N 1.133°W

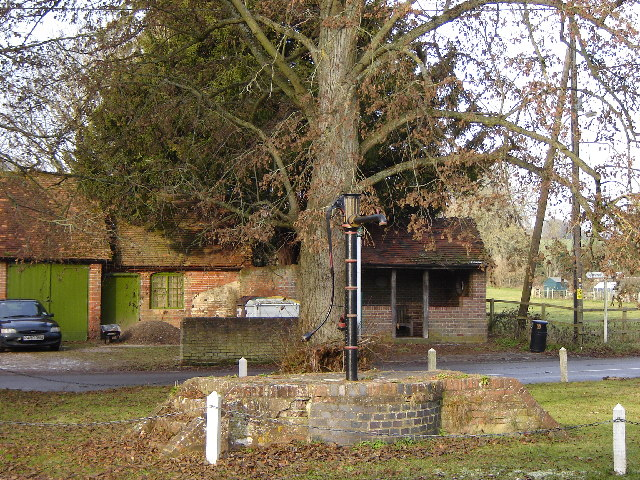
- The village pump at Preston Candover

- Location within Hampshire
- Population: 357; 510 (2011 Census including Bradley and Moundsmere)
- OS grid reference: SU6069341721
- District: Basingstoke and Deane
- Shire county: Hampshire
- Region: South East
- Country: England
- Sovereign state: United Kingdom
- Post town: BASINGSTOKE
- Postcode district: RG25
- Dialling code: 01256
- Police: Hampshire and Isle of Wight
- Fire: Hampshire and Isle of Wight
- Ambulance: South Central
- UK Parliament: Winchester
- Website: Preston Candover and Nutley Parish Council

Preston Candover is a village and large civil parish in Hampshire, England. It has two churches, only one of which is still in use. Its nearest town is Basingstoke, approximately 4.5 miles (7.2 km) away. It has an acreage of 3,457 acres (13.99 km^{2}), which lies on comparatively low ground, south of the high country round the surrounding villages of Farleigh Wallop and Nutley, and north-west of that which rises to Wield and beyond to Bentworth. The village itself lies on the lowest ground towards the west of the parish on the road which comes northeast from Northington and the two other Candovers, and runs across the parish to enter Nutley at Axford and continues uphill to Farleigh Wallop and then to Basingstoke.

The village was home to the late Lord Sainsbury of Preston Candover and his wife Anya Linden, of the supermarket Sainsbury family.

== History ==
The village of Preston Candover is probably of Saxon origin. It was originally called Prestecandavere, the Candover belonging to the Priests. The name derives in part from the Candover Brook which rises from springs just to the south of the village, and from a religious community which flourished here before the Norman Conquest.

By the eleventh century Preston parish had been carved up into six manors. The land from which they drew their revenues became organised into the common field system. This was based initially on three large fields worked in common by the villagers, although new fields were added as the population grew. The fields were divided into furlongs, each furlongs being divided in turn into strips of about 1-acre (4,000 m^{2}) in size. A family's holding consisted of a number of strips dotted about each of the common fields. Much of the higher ground in the valley was devoted to rough grazing and also held in common, this land comprising Preston and Nutley Down, Southwood Green, and Oakhills Common. At one time Preston Down was joined to those of Brown and Chilton Candover, and this made it an ideal route for the drovers and their herds. The trackway across the down today is known as the B3046 route.

=== Victorian times ===
By Victorian times Preston Candover and Nutley had a population of over 500 people. The land was divided between six main farms, ranging in size from 200 to 1,000 acres (4.0 km^{2}). The village at Preston formed a long straggling settlement. The cottages were a mixture of styles, some timber framed, others built of brick or of flint with brick dressings. The roofs were either thatched or tiled.

The villages of Preston Candover and Nutley each had a church dedicated to St Mary. Preston's church lay at the southern end of the village. It had been built in the seventeenth century, the original church, dating from 1190, having been destroyed by fire. The village also had a Methodist Chapel, built in 1865.

=== 1901 to the present ===
A major change in the appearance of the village occurred in the 1920s at the point where the Basingstoke–Alresford road met the road to Wield. Previously there had been just a pond lying at the fork in the road. In 1870 a parish pump was installed next to the pond. In dry summers it was much used by farmers from Wield and Ellisfield, while the brick steps became a favourite spot for visiting Methodist preachers to conduct meetings and for pedlars to display their wares. A memorial was erected in 1919 in honour of the 16 men of the parish killed in action during the Great War.

The Candovers are now today a main crossing point to New Alresford and Basingstoke, but still the three villages still remain in peaceful countryside.

== Governance ==
The village of Preston Candover is part of the civil parish of Preston Candover, which is part of the parish council of Preston Candover and Nutley. It is also part of the Upton Grey and the Candovers ward of Basingstoke and Deane borough council. The borough council is a Non-metropolitan district in Hampshire County Council.

== Religious sites ==
The church of St. Mary in the village dates from the Victorian period. As of 2005, the church regularly held traditional services, all age services, pet services and meditative services in the style of the Taizé community. The remains of a previous church, also dedicated to St. Mary, exist in the village; the church had existed since the Middle Ages and was burned in a fire in 1681, before being mostly demolished in 1883.

== Culture and community ==
As of 2005, the village contained a primary school, village shop, a post office, a village hall and a pub called the Purefoy Arms. In 2025, the Purefoy Arms was taken over by local residents, protecting it from residential development, with plans to re-open under the name The Candover.

== See also ==
- Brown Candover
- Chilton Candover
- Old Church of St Mary the Virgin, Preston Candover
