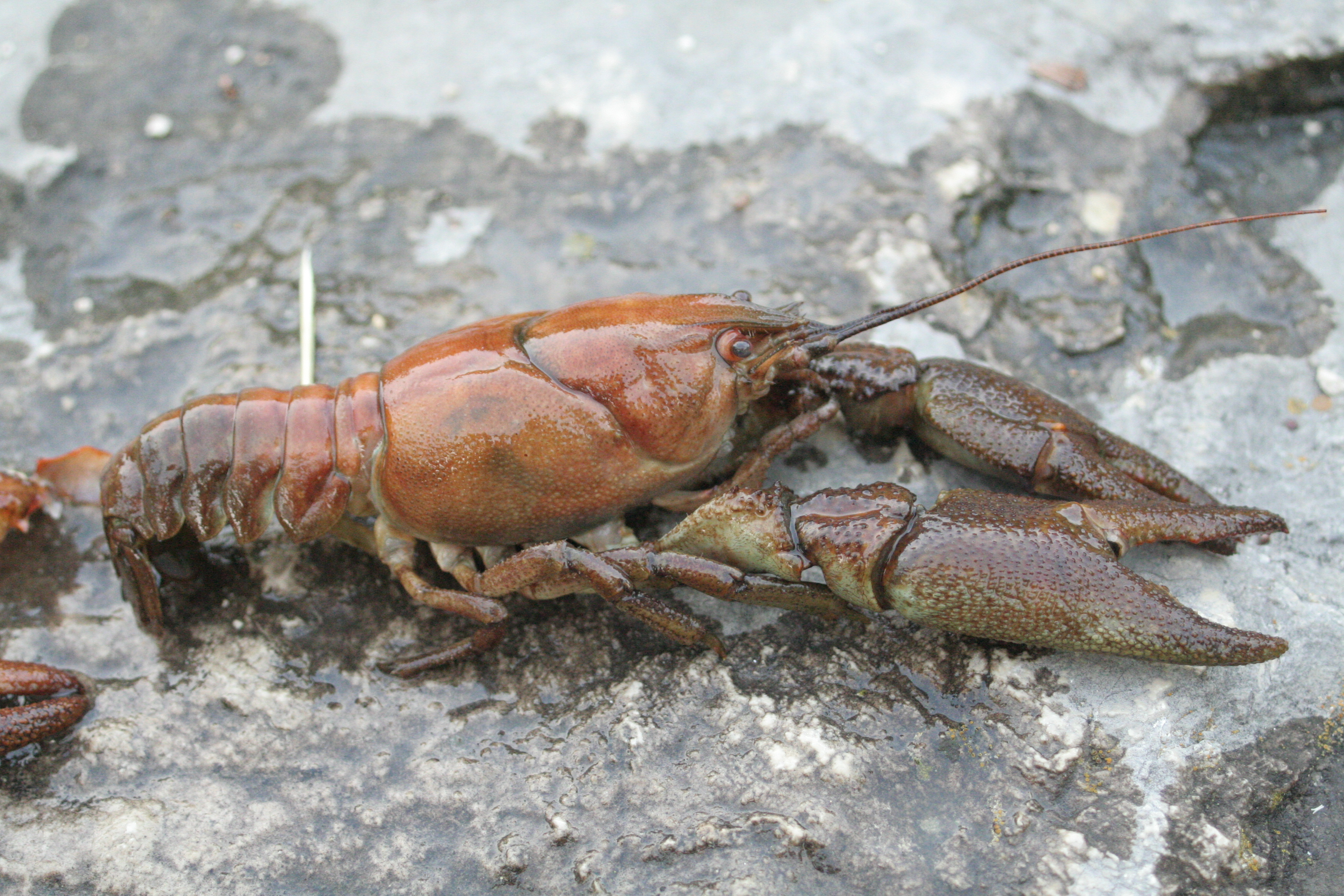

Conservation status
- Endangered (IUCN 3.1)

Scientific classification
- Kingdom: Animalia
- Phylum: Arthropoda
- Clade: Pancrustacea
- Class: Malacostraca
- Order: Decapoda
- Suborder: Pleocyemata
- Family: Astacidae
- Genus: Austropotamobius
- Species: A. pallipes

Binomial name
- Austropotamobius pallipes (Lereboullet, 1858)

Synonyms
- Astacus pallipes Lereboullet, 1858; Astacus pallipes var. flavus Lereboullet, 1858; Astacus fontinalis Carbonnier, 1869

= Austropotamobius pallipes =

White-clawed crayfish

Species of crayfish

Austropotamobius pallipes is an endangered European freshwater crayfish, and the only crayfish native to the British Isles. Its common names include white-clawed crayfish and Atlantic stream crayfish.

== Taxonomy ==
=== History of naming ===
In 1851, French zoologist Dominique Auguste Lereboullet published a paper in which he described several crayfish specimens purchased from a market in Strasbourg, France. He noted that two different forms were present among the specimens, but believed that both were variants of a species known at the time as Astacus fluviatilis (now considered a junior synonym of Astacus astacus). However, Lereboullet further analysed the specimens and later determined that the two forms were separate species. He therefore gave the scientific name Astacus pallipes to one of these forms in 1858, marking the first time it was recognised as a distinct species. In 1907, Russian zoologist Alexander Stepanovich Skorikov established a subgenus of Potamobius named Austropotamobius, and reclassified Astacus pallipes as a member of it. However, German carcinologist Richard Bott elevated Austropotamobius to genus rank in 1950, so the scientific name of the species was recombined as Austropotamobius pallipes.

Additionally, French scientist Pierre Carbonnier also studied this species and gave it the scientific name Astacus fontinalis in 1869. This name is now considered a junior synonym of Austropotamobius pallipes because they refer to the same species, and the pallipes name was established before the fontinalis name.

=== Classification ===
Biologists studying the white-clawed crayfish of Europe recognise that multiple different forms exist, though there has historically been some debate as to how they should be classified. In 1950, Richard Bott assigned three subspecies to Austropotamobius pallipes, namely A. p. pallipes, A. p. italicus and A. p. lusitanicus, and this classification was still accepted towards the end of the 20th Century. However, the genetic relationships between these forms were revealed as molecular science became more advanced, and it was discovered in 1998 that the nominate pallipes form is not as closely related to the italicus and lusitanicus forms as originally believed. The latter two were therefore reclassified as a separate species, which was formerly addressed as Austropotamobius italicus, but a paper published in 2006 noted that its valid name is actually Austropotamobius fulcisianus. Under this classification, A. pallipes is a monotypic species with no named subspecies, and it forms a species complex with A. fulcisianus collectively known as the "A. pallipes complex" or "white-clawed crayfish complex".

The extant species of the genus Austropotamobius can be divided into two species complexes, namely the A. torrentium complex and the A. pallipes complex. The latter includes two species, A. pallipes and A. fulcisianus, which are each other's closest living relative. Genetic analysis suggests that the last common ancestor of the two complexes lived in southeast Europe roughly 30 million years ago, during the start of the Oligocene epoch. At around the same time, southern Europe split into two landmasses (Western Europe and Balkanatolia), an event which triggered the divergence of the two lineages. The following cladogram shows the position of A. pallipes within its genus according to Pârvulescu et al. (2025):

- Austropotamobius
  - - A. bihariensis
    - A. torrentium
  - - A. pallipes
    - A. fulcisianus
      - A. f. meridionalis
      - - A. f. fulcisianus
        - A. f. orientalis

== Description ==
A. pallipes is olive-brown, with pale undersides to the claws (whence its specific Latin epithet pallipes, "pale feet"). It may grow to 12 cm (4.7 in) long, and adult sizes below 10 cm (3.9 in) are more common. It typically lives in rivers and streams about 1 m (3 ft) deep, where it hides among rocks and submerged logs, emerging to forage for food, and in lakes.

== Distribution ==
It is found from the easterly Balkan Peninsula to Spain and reaches its northerly limit in Great Britain, as well as Ireland (where it is considered introduced), where it is limited to some regions only: its highest densities are in chalk streams. A. pallipes is the only crayfish found in Ireland, occurring over limestone areas in rivers, streams, canals, and lakes. In France, A. pallipes is found in streams such as the Mornante and Sellon, two small tributaries of the Dorlay in the Loire department, where it is protected as a heritage species. It is also among the emblematic species of many French Natura 2000 sites as it tends to be less and less common in France while it used to be present in most rivers before North American crayfish species were introduced during the 20th century. It has also been introduced to Corsica, Liechtenstein, and Portugal (from where it is now extirpated).

It was once found across most of Great Britain; however its distribution is rapidly shrinking, and it is recorded in Yorkshire, central and northern England, east Kent, eastern Wales, the Candover Brook that flows into the Itchen in Hampshire; parts of Essex, and several long headwaters of the River Thames, where it competes with the introduced noble crayfish, itself also facing competition from the introduced signal crayfish. Dowdeswell Reservoir, Gloucestershire, has the species, and during works of 1998, Severn Trent ensured its protection. Disease from invasive species has wiped it from the naturally alkaline River Frome, Bristol, 2007–08.

== Ecology ==
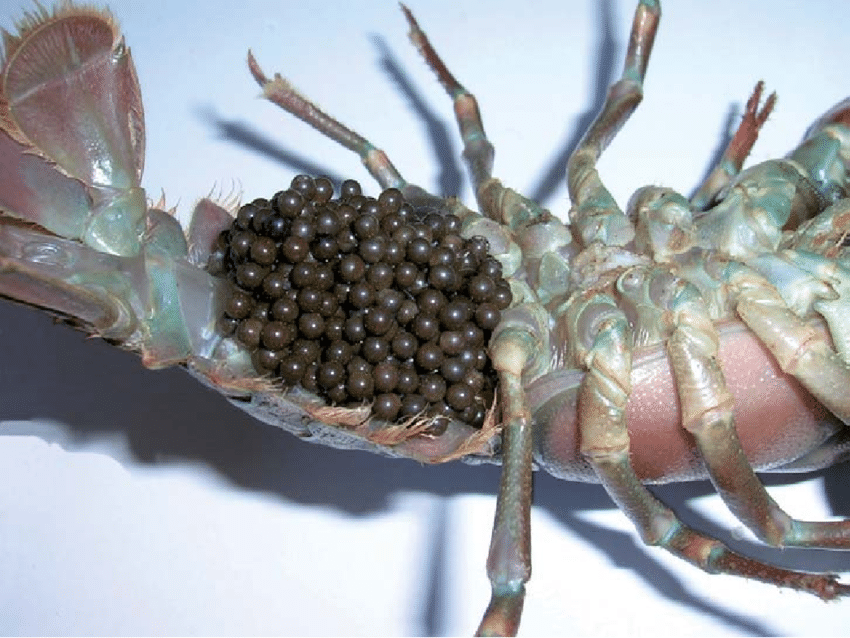
Eggs on abdomen

It is absent from more acidic waters and occurs in streams with a moderate flow alongside other freshwater invertebrates such as caddis fly, mayfly, and mollusc species. Trout and three-spined stickleback also occur in the same habitat. Tree roots and rocks in the banks provide shelter. Juveniles shelter in vegetation such as watercress and grass mats growing out of the bank.

== Conservation ==
Two main reasons for decline are:

- Introduction of the invasive North American signal crayfish (Pacifastacus leniusculus) and red swamp crayfish (Procambarus clarkii): The former is a carrier of crayfish plague, an infectious disease to which it has resistance, while A. pallipes has none. Consequently, A. pallipes tends to be more and more restricted to upstream sections of small rivers and rivulets, which can be more prone to summer droughts, creating a domino effect for this fragile species.
- Water pollution: Many local extinctions are caused by surface runoff of insecticides and of bleached, insufficiently treated, or illegal untreated wastewater.
