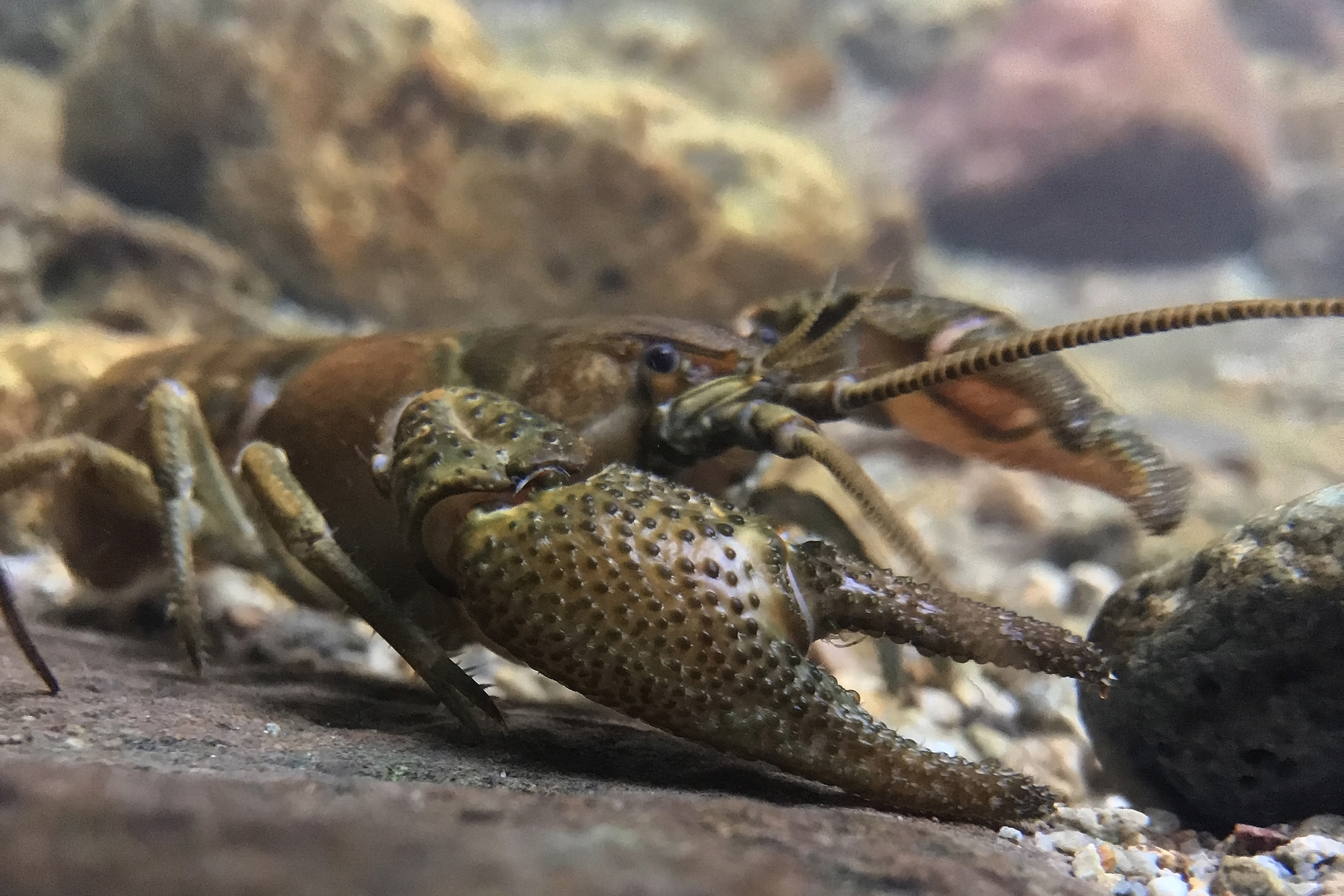

Scientific classification
- Kingdom: Animalia
- Phylum: Arthropoda
- Clade: Pancrustacea
- Class: Malacostraca
- Order: Decapoda
- Suborder: Pleocyemata
- Family: Astacidae
- Genus: Austropotamobius
- Species: A. bihariensis

Binomial name
- Austropotamobius bihariensis Pârvulescu, 2019

= Austropotamobius bihariensis =

Species of crayfish

Austropotamobius bihariensis is a species of crayfish in the family Astacidae. It is known to exist only in Romania, being restricted to the rivers in the western Apuseni Mountains. Its proposed English common name is idle crayfish. It is supposed to have diverged/split ~15 Ma old from a common relative of A. torrentium from the Dinarides and evolved isolated due to the historically tectonic north-eastern movement of Tisza-Dacia mega-unit (including the Apuseni Mountains) through the Pannonian Basin, during the Miocene. The molecular divergence in 582 base length nucleotides of COI mtDNA sequences is supported by 43 mutational steps, a differentiation of 7.4% from the sister clade of A. torrentium located in north-western Dinarides

== Taxonomy and evolution ==
In January 2019, a genetic study on populations of crayfish believed to represent the species Austropotamobius torrentium was published, with specimens from across the animal's known range in southeast Europe being analysed. The results revealed that the individuals from the Apuseni Mountains of Romania were genetically distinct from all other sampled populations, and should thus be considered a separate species. Two months later, a paper describing the Apuseni species in greater detail was published, in which the species was given the scientific name Austropotamobius bihariensis. The specific name honors Biharia, the region within Romania where most of the streams this species inhabits flow from. Furthermore, the common name "idle crayfish" was proposed, in reference to how no research was done on this species for a long time despite it being easy to find.

The extant species of the genus Austropotamobius can be divided into two species complexes, namely the A. torrentium complex and the A. pallipes complex, with A. bihariensis being a member of the former. Genetic analysis indicates that its lineage diverged from that of A. torrentium around 15 million years ago during the Miocene epoch. At this time, tectonic activity in the Pannonian Basin would have formed a barrier that reproductively isolated the ancestors of A. bihariensis from those of A. torrentium, triggering the evolutionary divergence of the two lineages. Glaciation during the Pleistocene epoch (2.58 million to 11,700 years ago) also prevented other crayfish species from reaching the Apuseni Mountains, further allowing the A. bihariensis lineage to evolve in isolation. The following cladogram shows the position of A. pallipes within its genus according to Pârvulescu et al. (2025):

- Austropotamobius
  - - A. bihariensis
    - A. torrentium
  - - A. pallipes
    - A. fulcisianus
      - A. f. meridionalis
      - - A. f. fulcisianus
        - A. f. orientalis

== Description ==
This crayfish strongly resembles its close relative A. torrentium. The individuals, not longer than 10 cm, are brown dorsally, showing lighter colors on the ventral side with hints of orange on the claws. In comparison with Austropotamobius torrentium (the stone crayfish), it has a shorter rostrum, the antennal scale is smooth without denticles, and the claws are covered with tubercules that are bigger and fewer than on the stone crayfish claws.

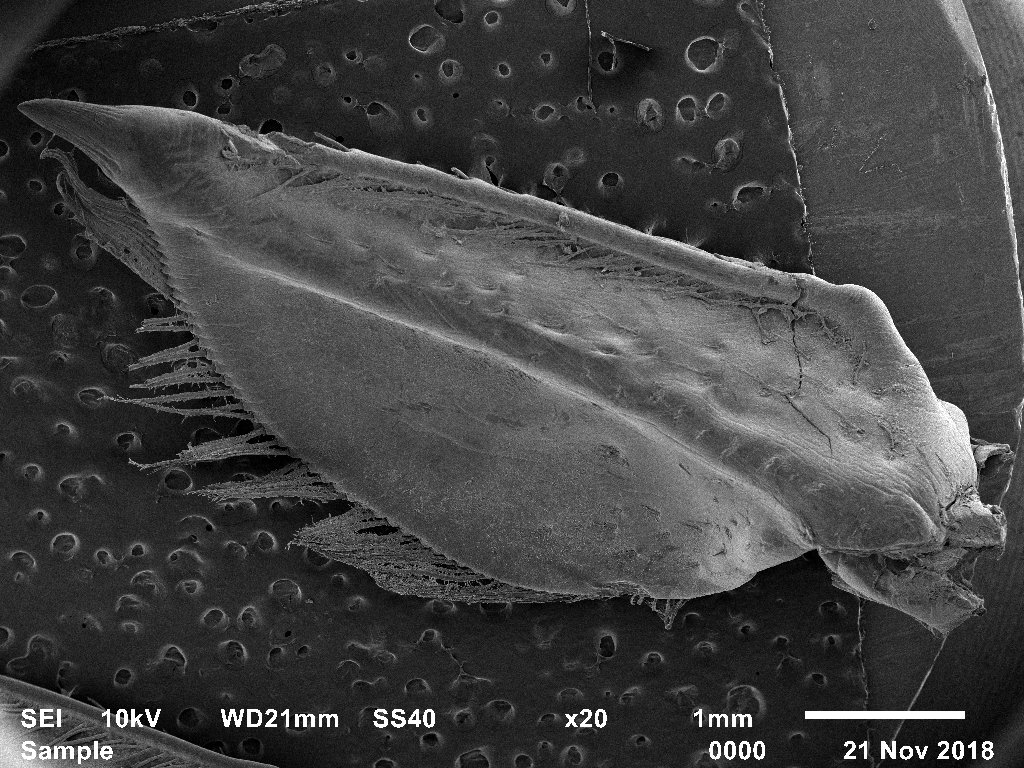
Antennal scale of Austropotamobius bihariensis

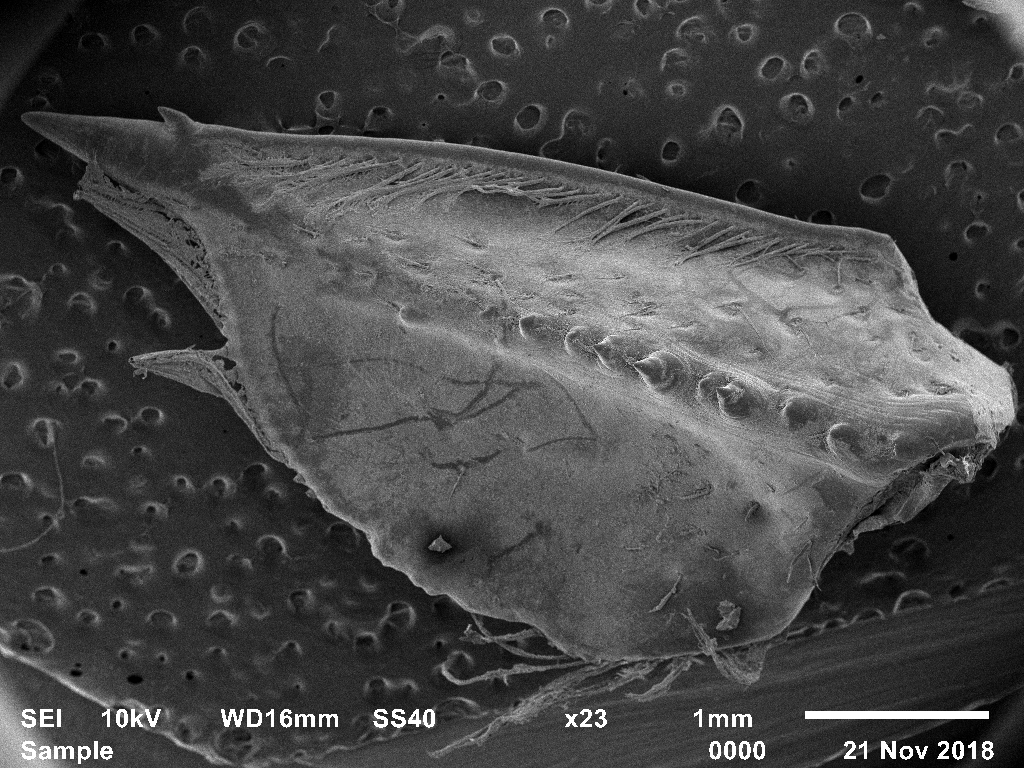
Antennal scale of Austropotamobius torrentium

== Ecology ==
European crayfish species prefer clean waters, but their tolerance to water pollution is variable. A. bihariensis seems to prefer cleaner and better oxygenated rivers than the stone crayfish.

== Distribution ==
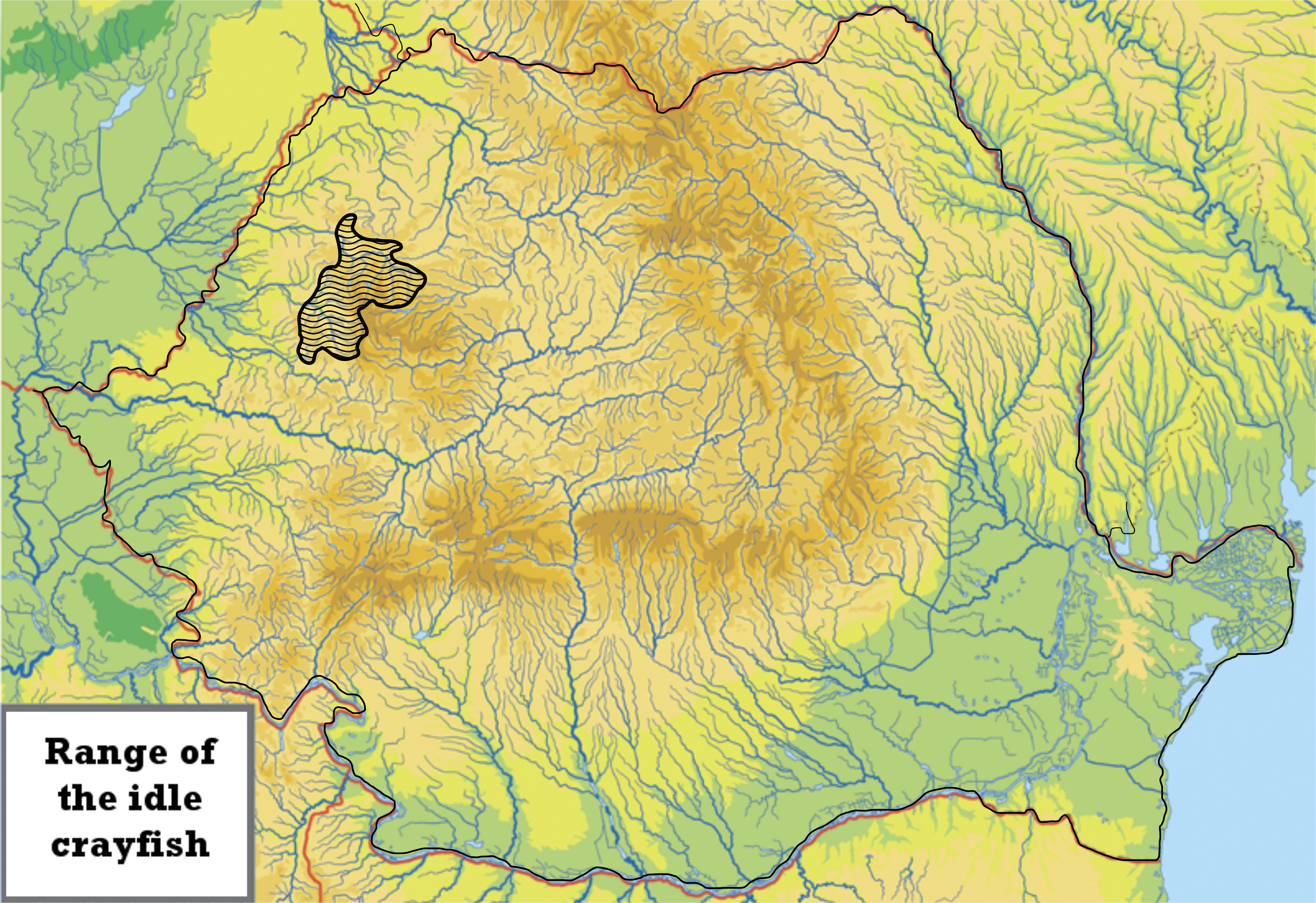
A. bihariensis range.

All the populations of A. bihariensis are found in the upper sectors of Criș rivers (Crișul Alb, Crișul Negru, Crișul Repede) and the upper area of the Arieș river. The holotype (deposited at the Grigore Antipa National Museum of Natural History) was collected from Damiș River, Bratca commune, Bihor county.

== Conservation ==
A. bihariensis populations were previously treated as A. torrentium (a threatened species, listed in the IUCN Red List and the appendix of the Bern Convention and EU Habitats Directive. Based on a 13-year study, the most appropriate conservation status for the idle crayfish was assessed as Endangered. This assessment was later included in the IUCN Red List update in March 2025.

Along with other crayfish species from Europe, the idle crayfish faces several threats, including poor forest management, extreme drought, anthropogenic development, and riverbed alterations. These threats can be exacerbated by a low-virulence crayfish plague infection (A-haplogroup). The total population was estimated at 31,150 individuals, with 1,163,754 m² of suitable habitat, but only 37.9% of this habitat lies within protected areas.

In Romania, A. bihariensis is protected in national legislation (by attaching it to the status accorded to A. torrentium). According to the Emergency Ordinance no. 57/2007 (amended by OUG no. 7/2025), which implements the EU Habitats Directive, the species is listed in Annex 3 and Annex 5, requiring the designation of Sites of Community Importance (SCI) and Special Areas of Conservation (SAC) to ensure its protection.
