= Yair Ziv =

British businessman (born 1956)

- יאיר זיו
- Born: Yair Ziv; 1956 (age 69–70); Israel
- Education: Tel Aviv University
- Occupation: Businessman

Yair Ziv (Hebrew: יאיר זיו; born 1956) is an Israeli-born British businessman.

== Early life and education ==
Ziv was born in Israel in 1956. He has a degree in political science and philosophy from Tel Aviv University (1979–82).

== Career ==
Ziv worked for the Israeli Foreign Office and later became general manager of Meridian Commodities. He was a director of commercial property company Riverland Holdings Limited from 1993 to 2003 and finance director of formerly AIM quoted mining company Target Resources plc from July 2005 to June 2010.

He is a director of Hill House Equine Limited, incorporated in 2014, and at least eight other companies.

== Personal life ==
Ziv lives in Alresford, Hampshire.
