= Candover Brook =

River in Hampshire, England

Coordinates: 51.167°N 1.134°W

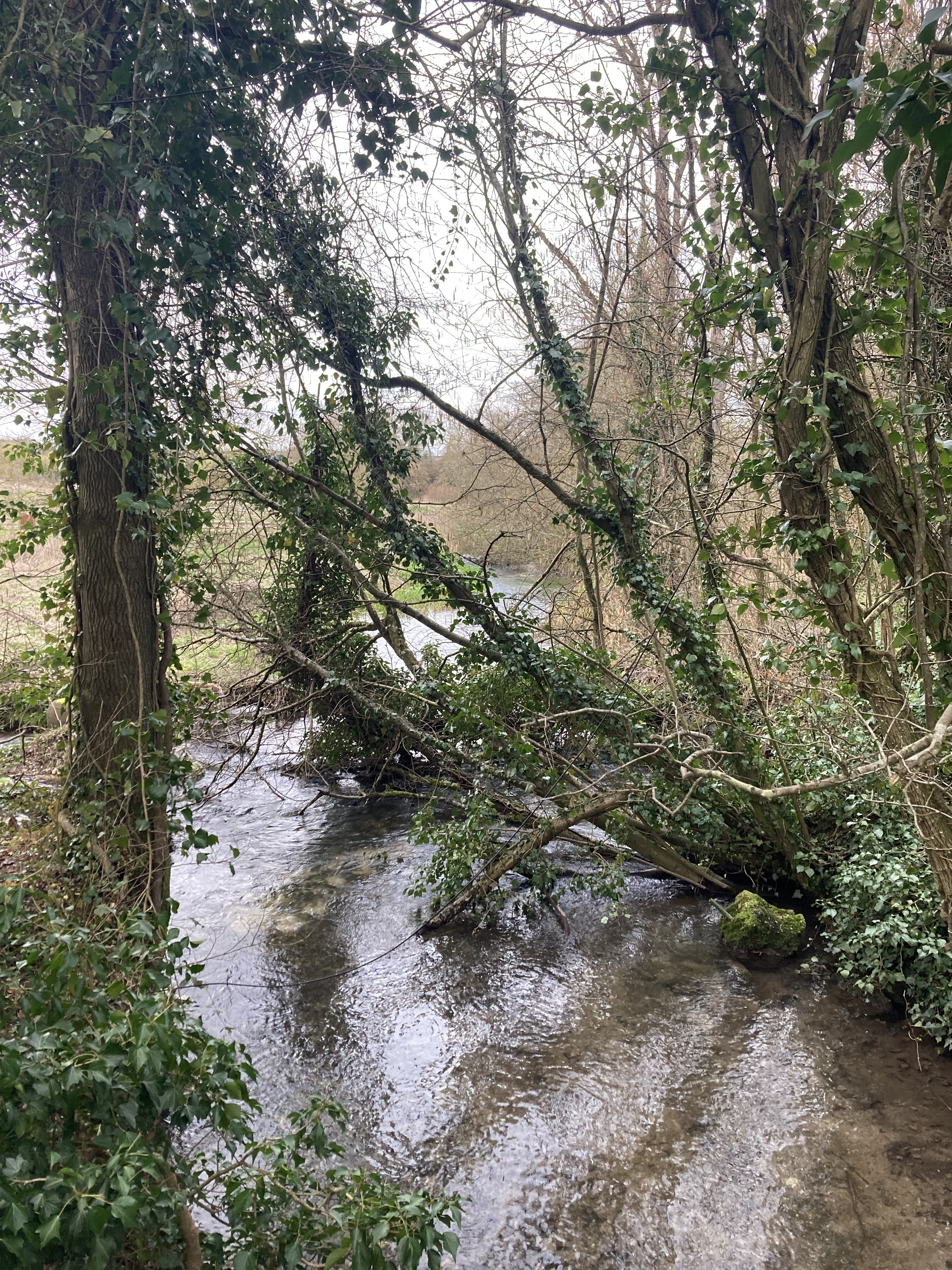
Candover Brook, north of New Alresford

The Candover Brook is a 9.6 km (6.0 mi) chalk stream in the English county of Hampshire. It is a tributary of the River Itchen, which it joins near the town of New Alresford. The stream rises from springs just to the south of the village of Preston Candover.

It is one of the few rivers remaining in southern England that is home to the endangered native white-clawed crayfish.

Candover Brook is part of the Itchen Valley Countryside Heritage Area, recognising the distinctive features and biological richness of this area.
