= River Alre =

River in Hampshire, England

River Alre River Arle
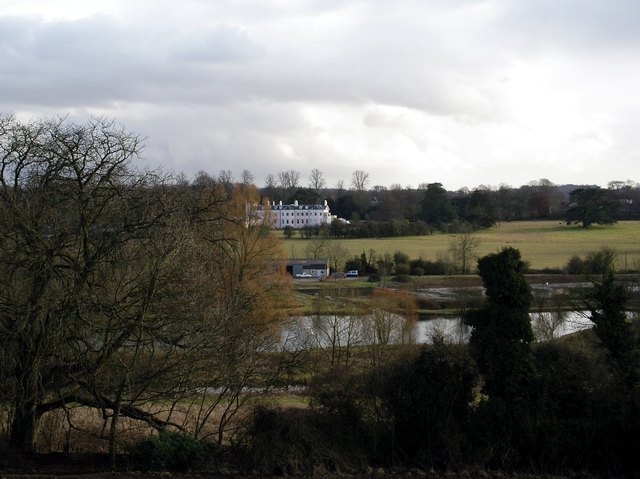
- Alre Valley

- The river as shown on a 19th century OS map

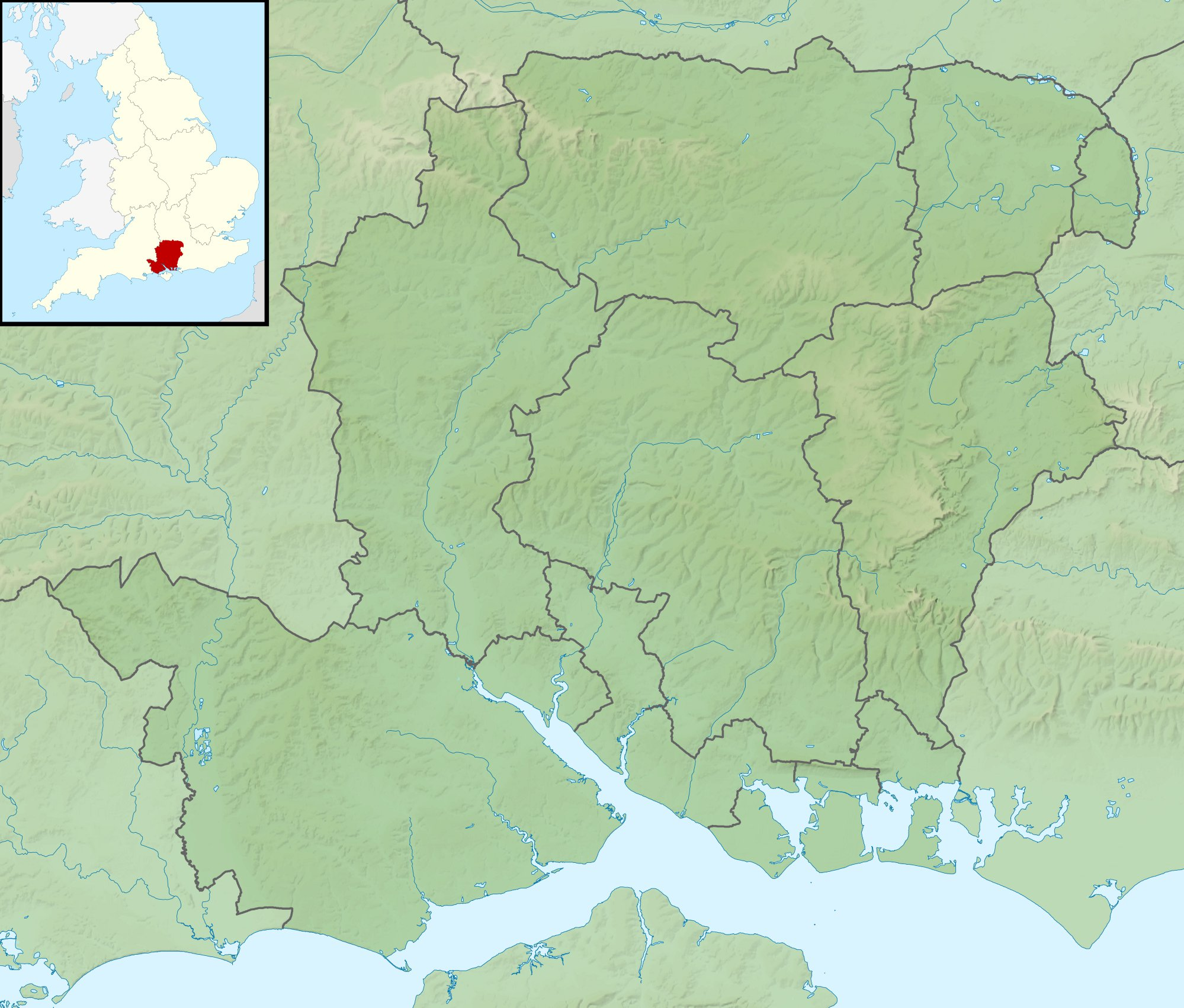
- Confluence into the Itchen, in Hampshire
- Etymology: A back formation from Alresford

Location
- Country: England
- County: Hampshire

Physical characteristics
- Source
  - location: east end of Bishop's Sutton, Hampshire
  - coordinates: 51°4′56″N 1°7′11″W
  - elevation: 72 m (236 ft)
- Mouth: River Itchen
  - location: near New Alresford, Hampshire
  - coordinates: 51°5′16″N 1°11′2.9″W
  - elevation: 51 m (167 ft)
- Length: 6.0 km (3.7 mi)
- Basin size: 56.31 km^{2} (21.74 sq mi)
- Discharge
  - location: New Alresford

Basin features
- Progression: Alre, Itchen, Southampton Water arm of The Solent (English Channel)
- River system: Itchen basin

The River Alre (also, occasionally, Arle) is a tributary of the River Itchen in Hampshire in the south of England. It rises in Bishop's Sutton and flows west for 6 km (3.7 mi) to meet the Itchen below New Alresford.

The river is a classic English chalk stream with a shallow gravel bed and fast flowing waters, fed year-round by chalk springs. Through Bishop's Sutton it forms a good natural trout fishery and later supports a watercress harvest after which the Watercress Line, a heritage steam railway, is named.

== Name and etymology ==
The river's name is an example of a so-called back-formation whereby a given name is based on another place-name, typically via a false or ungrounded theory or misunderstanding of the name's meaning. In this case the river was named by the local population after the fact that it ran through New Alresford assuming that the name Alresford meant the ford on the river Alre / Arle. In reality Alresford derives from the Old English alor (alder tree) and means "Ford at the Alder Tree". This theory is supported by the fact that the Alre river name is recorded relatively late- first appearing indirectly as Alsford ryver in 1540 and then as Arre and Arle in 1586.

Further evidence for the Alre's name being an invention due to its location near New Alresford is the fact that Old Alresford (the older of the two settlements and the original Alresford) does not sit on the Alre. Rather it is situated on the banks of an unnamed tributary stream of the Alre and not the larger river to its south. This clearly supports the fact that the name was invented later after New Alresford was founded after the 12th Century. It can therefore not be the original name of the river after which the settlement was named.

The Alre's relatively late mention is explained via the fact that until the Late Middle Ages the River Alre was considered to be the headwater of the Itchen. This can be seen in the several Anglo-Saxon charter boundaries which refer to the Alre as the Itchen. In fact the two rivers distinctions haven't always been clear with the Itchen itself at one point being referred to as the River Alre. In a record from 1447 Denewater is mentioned as the name for the river which runs through Alresford. It has been suggested that this name was the pre-16th Century name for the Alre and is in reference to the source of the river in Ropley Dean a hamlet of Ropley East of Alresford. In fact the valley which Ropley Dean is situated within still occasionally bears a small stream. However, 'dene' is common place-name element meaning valley, deriving from Old English 'denu' and may be unrelated to Ropley, or may even refer to "The Dean", an area of settlement in New Alresford near the Arle.

Another theory, which claims far less evidence is that the river took its name from the same alder tree as Alresford as it was supposedly a prominent alder tree.

The alternative spelling of the river's name Arle is as old as its first mention and in reality there is no correct spelling as even into the 20th Century it was recorded both ways.

== Course ==
The river rises at a spring in the parish of Bishop's Sutton, 800 metres east of the old core of the village. Flowing west, the lesser-populated north bank of the village has the first of its three little crossings, Water Lane, a ford. Here the Alre runs between the parish church of St Nicholas and the site of the former bishop's palace, owned by the Bishop of Winchester for centuries, that gives the village its name.

It runs through Western Court Farm, where it provides the waters for the farm's watercress beds, and soon after it runs under the railway bridge of the Mid Hants Railway, known as the Watercress Line as it used to transport watercress from New Alresford to Alton and London.

North east of Alresford, the river has been split with one channel running through the Old Alresford Pond, an artificial 12th-century stew pond that was dug to provide fish for the Bishop of Winchester. It may also have served as a balancing pond for a navigation channel dug to the south. It is now designated a Site of Special Scientific Interest.

The Alre runs just to the north of New Alresford, separating it from the smaller village of Old Alresford and forming the parish boundary between the two for much of its route. Here it runs under two water mills, Arle Mill and The Fulling Mill, as well as supporting additional watercress farms. Fulling is the process of removing oils from wool and the mill dates back to the 13th century. Derelict by the 19th century, it was saved from demolition in 1951 and is now a private residence.

Its final section flows a couple of hundred metres south west through fields into the meandering course of the River Itchen.

== History ==
Daniel Defoe mentions the river in his book A tour thro' the whole island of Great Britain.

"From thence we ride to Tichfield as above, where we pass the River Alre, which rises in the same County at Alresford, or near it, which is not above Twenty-two Miles off; and yet it is a large River here, and makes a good Road below, call'd Tichfield-bay."

== Water quality ==
The Environment Agency measure water quality of the river systems in England. Each is given an overall ecological status, which may be one of five levels: high, good, moderate, poor and bad. There are several components that are used to determine this, including biological status, which looks at the quantity and varieties of invertebrates, angiosperms and fish. Chemical status, which compares the concentrations of various chemicals against known safe concentrations, is rated good or fail.

Water quality of the River Alre in 2019:

Section	Ecological Status	Chemical Status	Overall Status	Length	Catchment	Channel
Alre	Good	Fail	Moderate	5.986 km (3.720 mi)	56.31 km^{2} (21.74 sq mi)	
