= Alresford Community Centre =

Municipal building in New Alresford, Hampshire, England

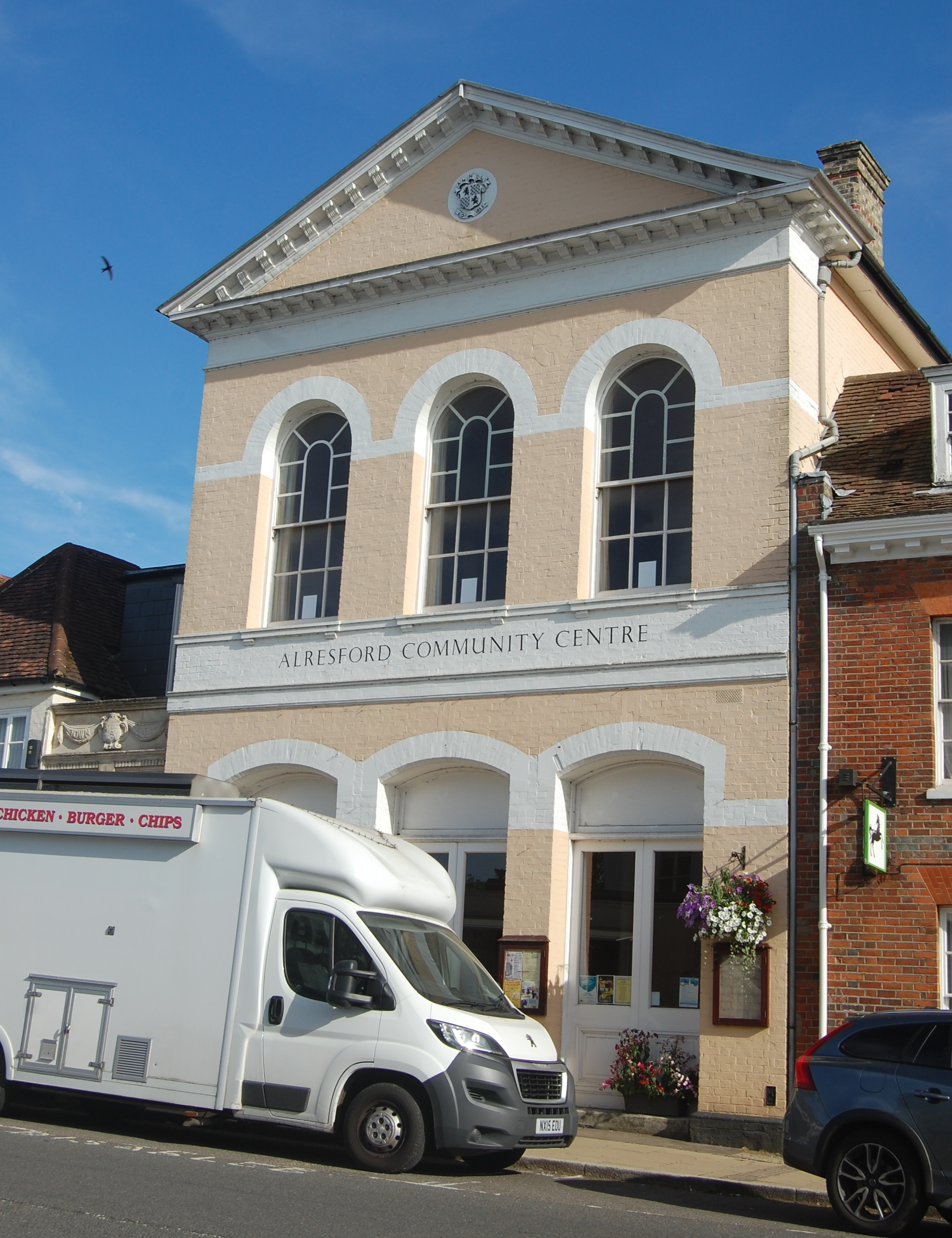
- Alresford Community Centre

- Shown in Hampshire
- 51.0904°N 1.1616°W
- Location: West Street, New Alresford

History
- Built: 1866

Site notes
- Architect: William Hunt
- Architectural style: Italianate style

Listed Building – Grade II
- Official name: Community Centre (Town Hall)
- Designated: 16 November 1983
- Reference no.: 1095198

Alresford Community Centre, formerly Alresford Town Hall, is a municipal building in West Street, New Alresford, Hampshire, England. The structure, which is now used as a community events venue, is a Grade II listed building.

== History ==
The first municipal building in New Alresford was a market house at the south end of Broad Street which was completed in the 13th century. Market rents were collected by the bailiff on behalf of the borough council. By the mid-18th century, the market house was very dilapidated and, in 1824, it was demolished.

In the mid-19th century, a group of local businessmen decided to form a company, known as the "Alresford Market House Company", to finance and commission a new market house. The site they selected, on the south side of West Street, was occupied by the Rose and Crown Public House. The new building was designed by William Hunt in the Italianate style, built by local builders, W. & F. Fowler, in brick with a stucco finish, and was officially opened by the High Sheriff of Hampshire, John Thomas Dutton, on 22 March 1866. The design involved a symmetrical main frontage of three bays facing onto West Street. The ground floor featured three segmentally headed openings, while the first floor was fenestrated by three rounded headed windows. There was a moulded band above the ground floor openings and, at roof level, there was a frieze and a modillioned pediment. To the left of the main structure, there was a slightly recessed, single-storey porch with a round headed opening, flanked by imposts which supported an arch with a keystone, and surmounted by a panel containing carvings of festoons. Internally, the principal rooms were the market hall on the ground floor and an assembly room, which was 45 feet (14 m) long and 24 feet (7.3 m) wide on the first floor.

The use of the building as a market house declined significantly in the wake of the Great Depression of British Agriculture in the late 19th century. However, the assembly room continued to be used for public events and, although the borough council was abolished under the Municipal Corporations Act 1883, the building became known as "Alresford Town Hall".

After the development company got into financial difficulties in 1924, the building was acquired by a private investor who let the ground floor for various uses, including as a butcher's shop during the 1930s, and who allowed the assembly hall to continue to host the local petty sessions. After a change of ownership in 1942, the ground floor was also let for judicial purposes, as a juvenile court. The building was the acquired by the Alresford Chamber of Trade in 1958 and then transferred to the newly formed Alresford & District Community Association in 1964. Since then the building has continued to be used as a venue for exhibitions, craft shows and other community events.
