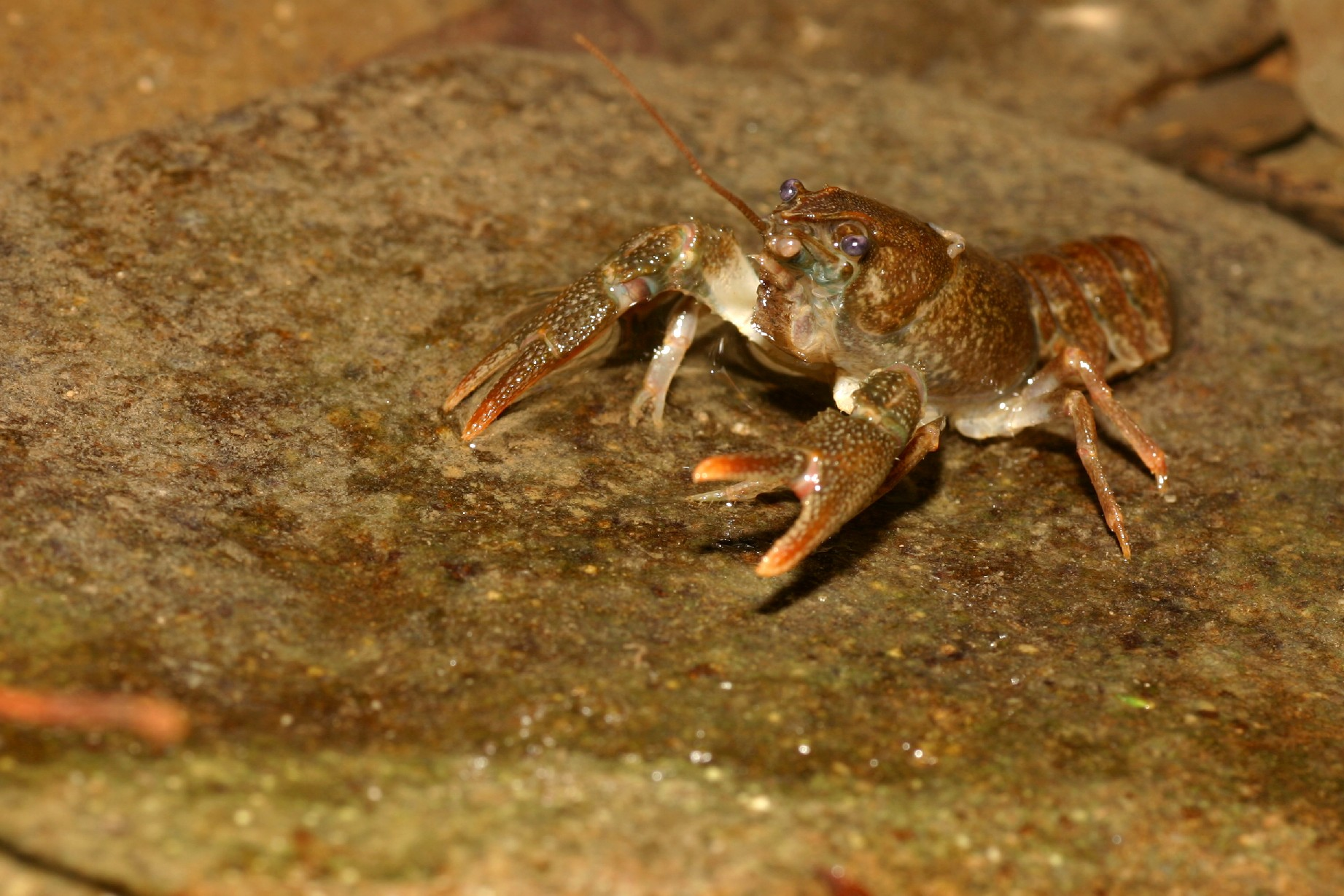
- Austropotamobius torrentium

Scientific classification
- Kingdom: Animalia
- Phylum: Arthropoda
- Clade: Pancrustacea
- Class: Malacostraca
- Order: Decapoda
- Suborder: Pleocyemata
- Family: Astacidae
- Genus: Austropotamobius; Skorikow, 1907

Type species
- Cancer torrentium (original combination) Schrank, 1803

Synonyms
- List: Potamobius (Austropotamobius) Skorikov, 1907; Austropotamobius (Atlantoastacus) Bott, 1950

= Austropotamobius =

Austropotamobius Temporal range: Barremian–Recent

Genus of crayfishes

Austropotamobius is a genus of European crayfish in the family Astacidae. It contains four extant species,

- Austropotamobius bihariensis Pârvulescu 2019 — Idle crayfish
- Austropotamobius fulcisianus (Ninni, 1886)
- Austropotamobius pallipes (Lereboullet, 1858) — White-clawed crayfish
- Austropotamobius torrentium (Schrank, 1803) — Stone crayfish
- Austropotamobius llopisi ? (Via, 1971) † Las Hoyas (Cuenca prov.), and El Montsec (Lleida prov.), Spain, Early Cretaceous (Barremian) (placement in the genus has been questioned)

== Taxonomy and evolution ==
In 1907, a study by Russian zoologist Alexander Stepanovich Skorikov regarding the classification of some European and Asian crayfish species was published. Skorikov concluded that the crayfish genus Potamobius should be divided into two subgenera, and established the name Austropotamobius for one of them. Though he assigned two species (A. torrentium and A. pallipes) to this subgenus, Skorikov did not designate either of them as its type species. This was later addressed by German carcinologist Richard Bott, who designated Cancer torrentium (the original name of Austropotamobius torrentium) as the type species of Austropotamobius in a paper published in 1950. In the same paper, Bott also elevated Austropotamobius to the rank of genus, declaring that it is separate from Potamobius rather than a variant of it as Skorikov believed. Furthermore, he divided Austropotamobius into two subgenera named Austropotamobius and Atlantoastacus respectively. However, later authors have abandoned the idea of Austropotamobius containing subgenera, and Atlantoastacus is thus deemed a junior synonym of it.

The extant members of Austropotamobius can be divided into two species complexes, namely the A. torrentium complex and the A. pallipes complex. Genetic analysis suggests that the last common ancestor of the two complexes lived in southeast Europe roughly 30 million years ago, during the start of the Oligocene epoch. At around the same time, southern Europe split into two landmasses (Western Europe and Balkanatolia), an event which triggered the divergence of the two lineages. The following cladogram shows the phylogenetic relationships between extant members of Austropotamobius according to Pârvulescu et al. (2025):

- Austropotamobius
  - - A. bihariensis
    - A. torrentium
  - - A. pallipes
    - A. fulcisianus
      - A. f. meridionalis
      - - A. f. fulcisianus
        - A. f. orientalis

Furthermore, an extinct species known from fossils has been assigned to this genus under the name Austropotamobius llopisi. Its remains have been found in a site in Spain known as Las Hoyas, and date back to the Barremian stage of the Early Cretaceous period. If the assignment to Austropotamobius is correct, it would suggest that this genus had already evolved about 125 million years ago.
