= Old Alresford =

Village and parish in Hampshire, England

Coordinates: 51°06′07″N 1°09′50″W

- Village
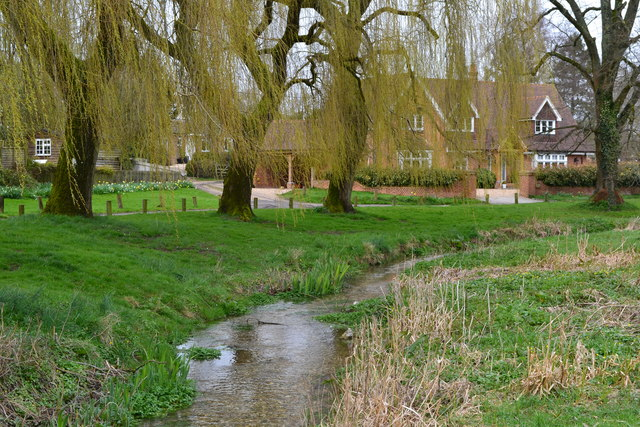
- Stream on the village green at Old Alresford, Hampshire

- Location within Hampshire
- Population: 599
- OS grid reference: SU5832
- District: City of Winchester
- Shire county: Hampshire
- Region: South East
- Country: England
- Sovereign state: United Kingdom
- Post town: ALRESFORD
- Postcode district: SO24
- Dialling code: 01962
- Police: Hampshire and Isle of Wight
- Fire: Hampshire and Isle of Wight
- Ambulance: South Central
- UK Parliament: Winchester

Old Alresford (/ˈɒlzfərd/ OLZ-fərd or /ˈɔːlzfərd/ AWLZ-fərd) is a village and civil parish in Hampshire, England. It is 1 km (0.6 miles) north of the town of New Alresford, 12 km (7 miles) northeast of the city of Winchester, and 14 km (9 miles) south-west of the town of Alton.

Alresford Pond is a large water feature south of Old Alresford and north of New Alresford.

== Etymology ==
Old Alresford is first mentioned in an Anglo-Saxon Charter of 701 as Alresforda. Its name derives from the Old English Alor and Ford and means the ford at the alder tree.

== History ==
St Mary the Virgin parish church is a brick building dating from the 1750s. The naval hero George Brydges Rodney, 1st Baron Rodney, is buried in the church. His family seat, Old Alresford House, is next to the church. Also in the churchyard is the mausoleum of C. F. G. R. Schwerdt, an art collector, who died in 1939.

In 1851, George Sumner, son of Charles Richard Sumner (Bishop of Winchester), became rector of the parish. There his wife, Mary Sumner, started the Mothers' Union, now a global organisation of Anglican women. The first meetings were held in the rectory, now a conference centre known as Old Alresford Place.

In 1986, following the closure of the village school and post office, The Old Alresford Dramatic Society (T.O.A.D.S.) was founded as a way of bringing the village together. They perform a pantomime in December each year and a Spring Show, usually in May.
