= Winchester City Mill =

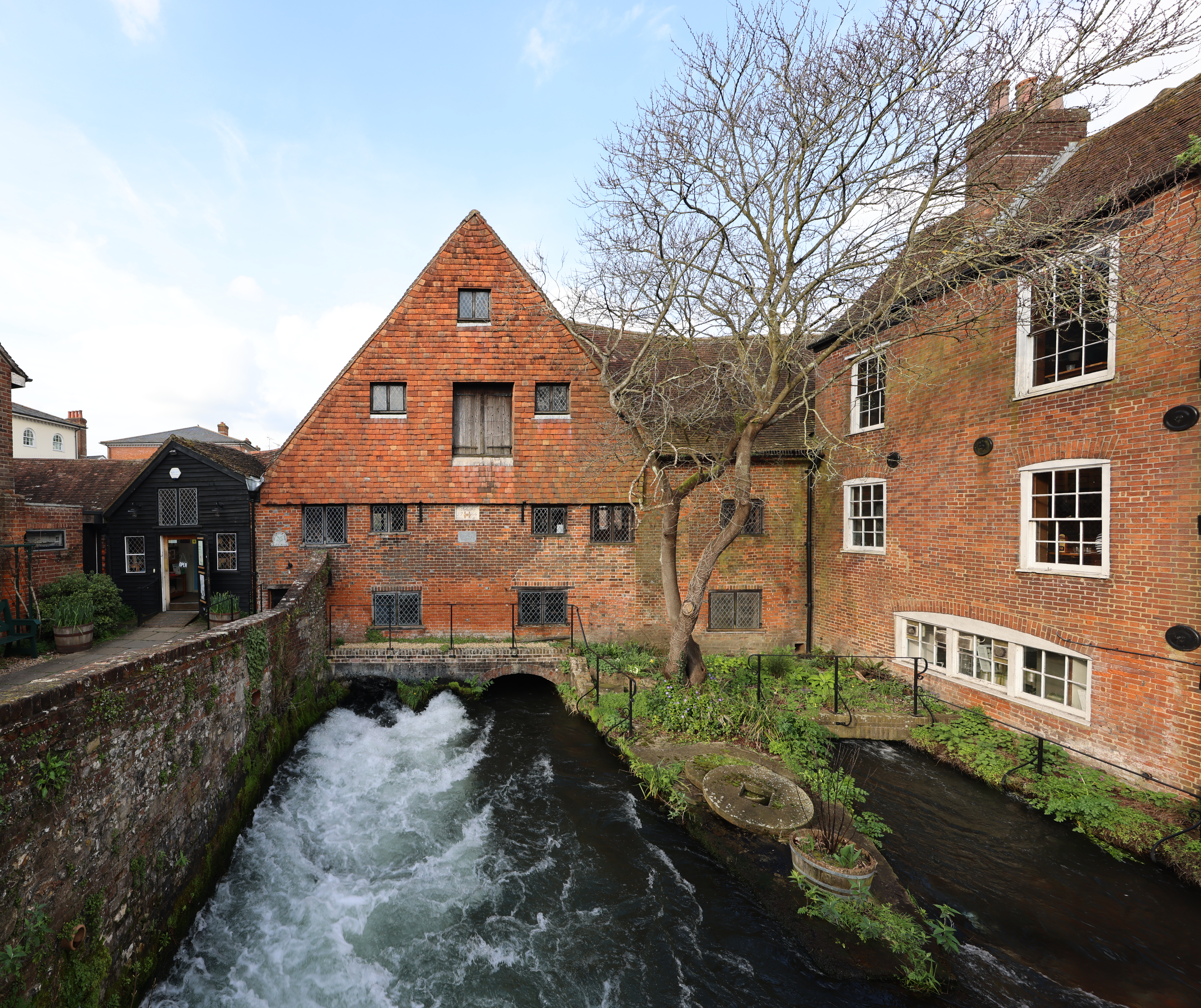
- Downstream front of the mill

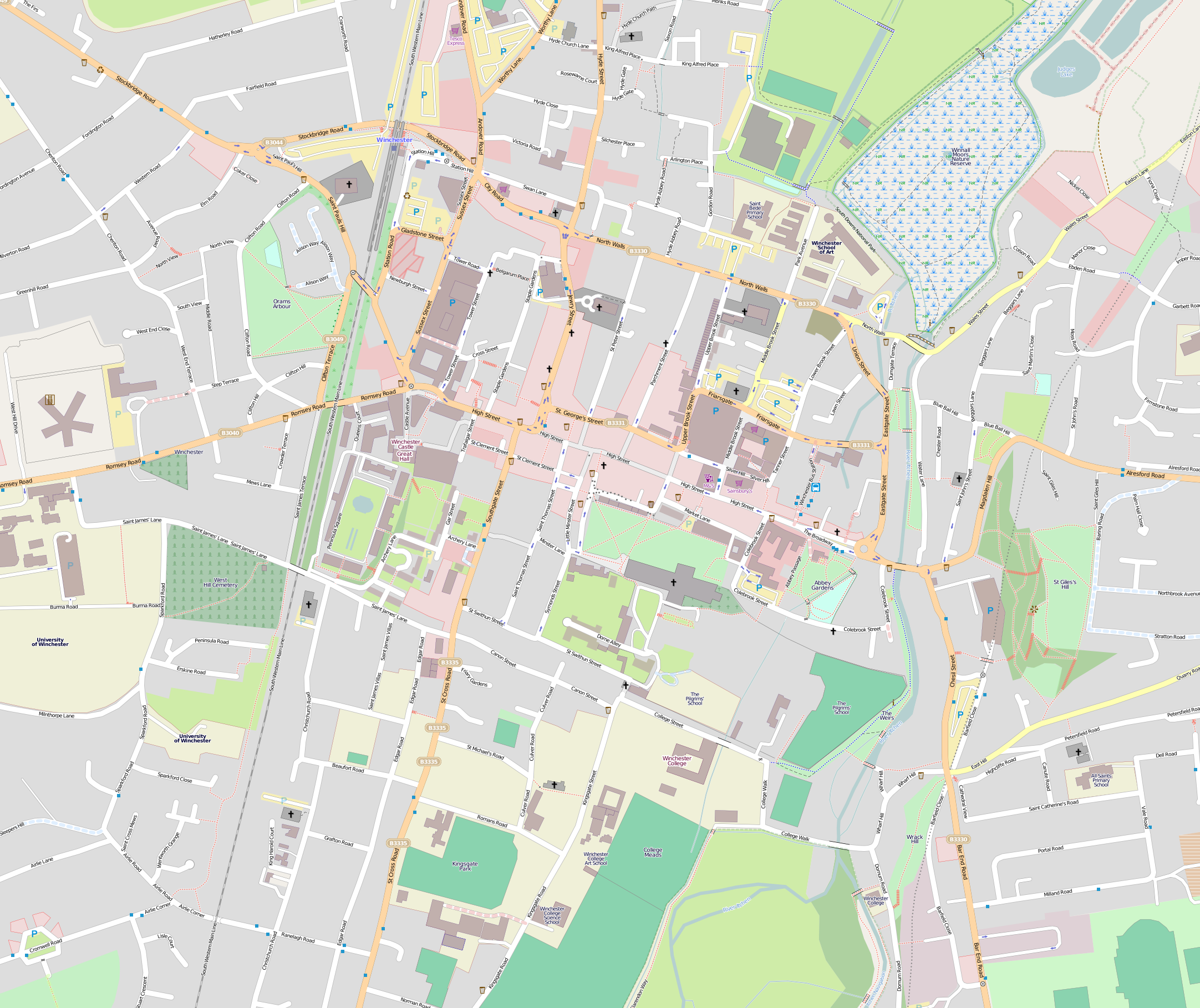
- Location within Central Winchester
- 51°03′40″N 1°18′28″W
- Type: Watermill
- Location: Water Lane, Winchester
- OS grid reference: SU 48615 29316

History
- Built: 1744

Site notes
- Area: Hampshire
- Owner: National Trust

Listed Building – Grade II*
- Official name: 1, Water Lane
- Designated: 24 March 1950
- Reference no.: 1095347

The Winchester City Mill is a restored water mill situated on the River Itchen in the centre of the ancient English city of Winchester. The mill is owned by the National Trust and is a Grade II* listed building.

== History ==
The mill was recorded, milling corn, in the Domesday Book of 1086. However, there are earlier references going back to 932 in the cathedral records. In 989 Queen Ælfthryth (wife of Edgar), had passed the mill to the nuns of Wherwell Abbey. Dendrochronological measurements date some of the timbers to the 11th Century.

It was originally known as Eastgate Mill because it lay just outside the east gate of the city of Winchester, but was renamed City Mill when it was given to the city by Mary I following her marriage to Philip II of Spain at Winchester Cathedral in 1554 The mill was last rebuilt in 1744 by James Cook, a tanner. A sketch made by the artist J. M. W. Turner in 1795 shows that the building and millraces today are relatively unchanged.

In 1820 the Corporation sold the mill to John Benham whose family owned the mill until the early 1900s. During the late 1890s, City Mill struggled financially owing to competition from adjacent mills at Durngate and Wharf Hill, and had ceased operation by 1910. The mill was used as a laundry during World War I, then became derelict. In 1928 the building was at risk of demolition; but it was saved by a group of benefactors who bought the mill and presented it to the National Trust. In 1931 the mill was leased to the Youth Hostels Association for use as a hostel, a usage that continued until 2005.

In 2004, a 12-year restoration program came to a successful conclusion, and after a hiatus of at least 90 years the mill again milled flour by water power. The water wheel has subsequently been run daily throughout the year with flour milling demonstrations at weekends. The mill building also houses a National Trust café and shop.

== Otter Watch ==
In partnership with the Hampshire and Isle of Wight Wildlife Trust and the Environment Agency, night-vision cameras have been set up to monitor the river passing under the mill and record images of otters passing through. Recordings of sightings are played back on a monitor in the stone floor area.
