= River Itchen, Hampshire =

River in Hampshire, England

Itchen Alre (see tributary so-named)
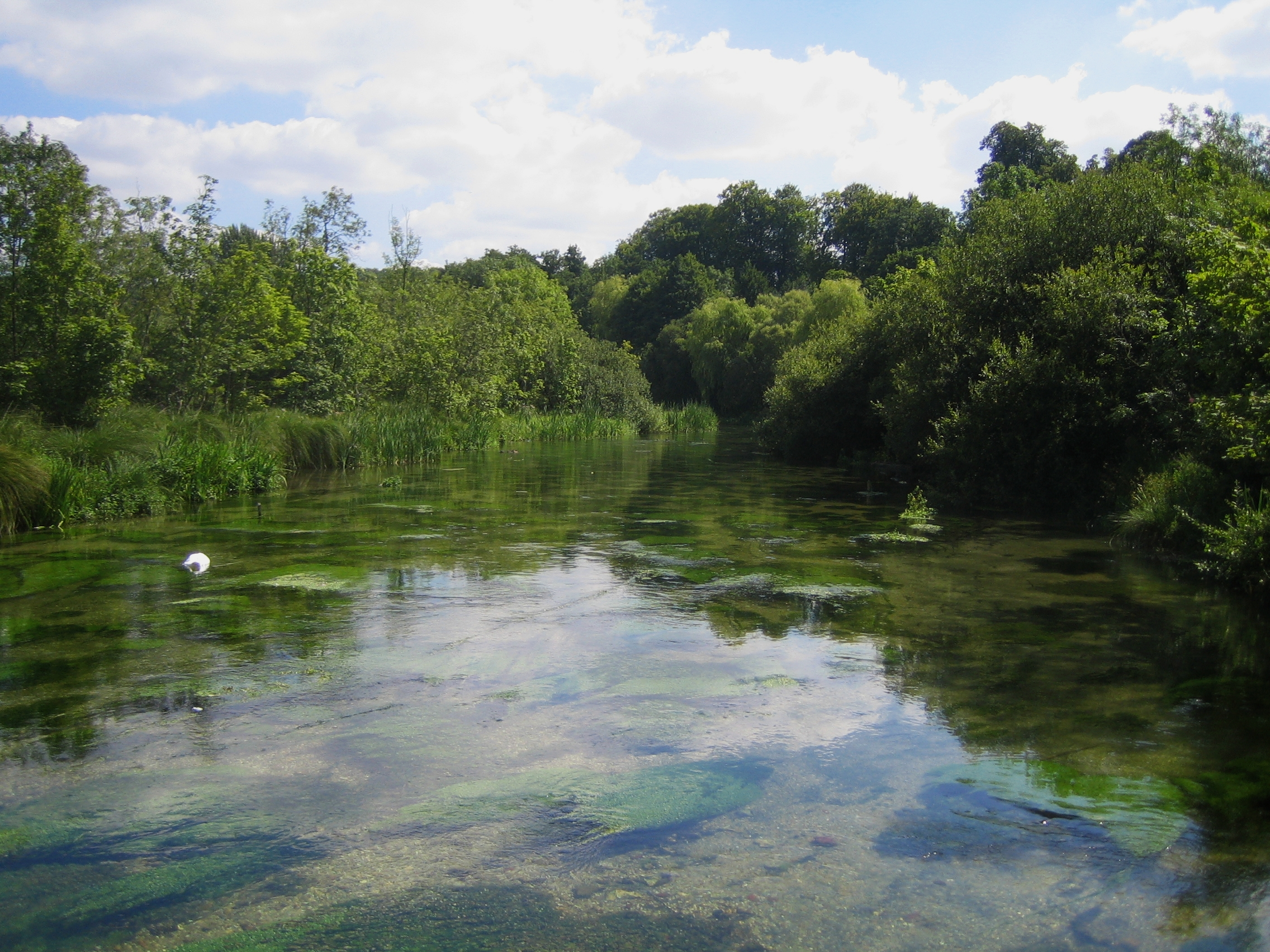
- The Itchen near Avington

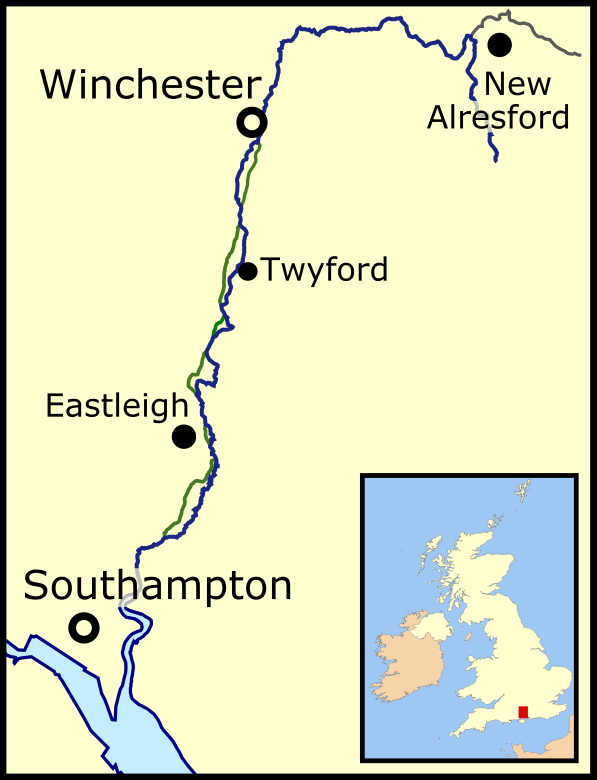
- Map of the River Itchen, in dark blue, and its principal tributary, the Alre, in grey. Canal sections of the Itchen Navigation in green.
- Etymology: Unknown

Location
- Country: England
- County: Hampshire
- City: Winchester Southampton

Physical characteristics
- Source
  - location: south of New Cheriton, Kilmeston, Hampshire, England
  - coordinates: 51.0426°N 1.1603°W
- Mouth: Southampton Water
  - location: Southampton, Hampshire
  - coordinates: 50°54′19″N 1°23′08″W
  - elevation: 0 metres
- Length: 26 miles (42 km) or unconventionally: 88 km (55 mi) (including all anabranches)
- Basin size: 119.619 km^{2} (46.185 sq mi)
- Discharge
  - location: Riverside Park, Bitterne Park
  - average: 5.3 m^{3}/s (190 cu ft/s)
  - minimum: 1.75 m^{3}/s (62 cu ft/s)14 August 1995
- Discharge
  - location: Highbridge, Hampshire
  - average: 5.4 m^{3}/s (190 cu ft/s)
- Discharge
  - location: Easton, Hampshire
  - average: 4.3 m^{3}/s (150 cu ft/s)

Basin features
- Tributaries
  - left: Candover Brook; River Alre; Nun's Walk Stream; Monks Brook
  - right: Cheriton Stream

The River Itchen in Hampshire, England, rises to the south of New Alresford and flows 26 miles (42 km) to meet Southampton Water below the Itchen Bridge. The Itchen Navigation was constructed in the late 17th and early 18th centuries to enable barges to reach Winchester from Southampton Docks, but ceased to operate in the mid-19th century and is largely abandoned today.

The river is one of the world's premier chalk streams for fly fishing, amenable to dry fly or nymphing. The local chalk aquifer has excellent storage and filtration and the river has long been used for drinking water. Watercress thrives in its upper reaches.

Much of the river from its source to Swaythling is classified as a 748.5-hectare (1,850-acre) biological Site of Special Scientific Interest (SSSI), and a Special Area of Conservation, of which the 9-hectare (22-acre) Hockley Meadows nature reserve is a part. The Itchen estuary is part of the separate Lee-on-The Solent to Itchen Estuary SSSI.

In March 2026 a capybara escaped from Marwell Zoo was spotted resting on the banks of the river near Twyford.

== Etymology and other name ==
The name is likely from a Brittonic language and in meaning unknown. The settlement of Itchen Abbas, before its abbot's ownership, is transcribed by early Middle English orthography which used the letter c followed by e or i to denote the /tʃ/ sound and an e invariably after an n to avoid those down strokes being ambiguous thus, as Icene in the Domesday Book of 1086. The name, in upper parts was once seen as interchangeable with the tributary Alre.

== Course ==
The source is north of Kilmeston, in that civil and ecclesiastical parish. The river flows north, through Cheriton village and east of overwhelmingly agricultural Tichborne village, before joining with tributaries the River Alre and Candover Brook immediately north-west of the town of New Alresford. The river then carves its way west passing the villages of Avington, Itchen Stoke, Itchen Abbas, Martyr Worthy, Easton, and Abbots Worthy; to enter the cathedral city of Winchester it crosses Winnall Moors to turn south for its remainder.

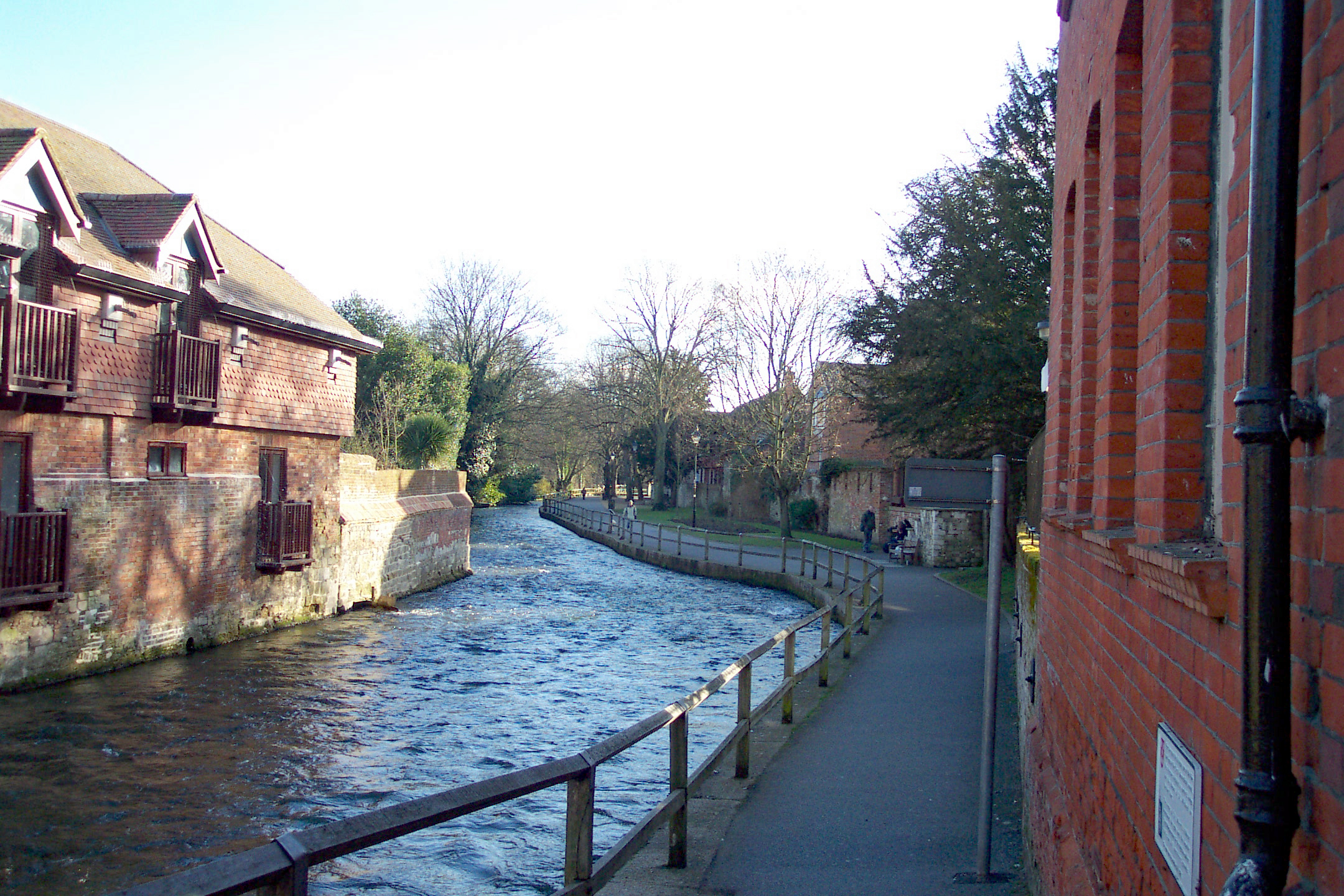
"The Weirs" in Winchester.

It flows in anabranches through the city, some close enough to Winchester Cathedral to cause problems to the foundations in the past. The main channel flows through Winchester City Mill and to the east of the city's Roman walls, along a promenaded reach known as "The Weirs".

Its waters can overflow into water-meadows, passing: the Hospital of St Cross; the villages of Twyford; Shawford; between the town of Eastleigh and the village of Bishopstoke; and through Itchen Valley Country Park before reaching the northern suburbs of Southampton at Mansbridge. Between Winchester and Mansbridge, sections were deepened or widened for the long-disused Itchen Navigation, and the former towpath forms part of the Itchen Way.

Monks Brook flows into the Itchen at Swaythling, and the river then passes under Woodmill Bridge and becomes tidal. Four further bridges cross it before the Test estuary in Southampton Water:

- Cobden Bridge, a road bridge connecting Bitterne Park and St Denys.
- Cobden railway bridge carrying the Southampton – Portsmouth railway line. Opened in 1866, the bridge is supported by two sets of cast iron cylinders resulting in three 115-foot openings. The bridge's girders are made from wrought iron. In order to try to prevent the Northam Bridge Company from trying to block the bill authorising the railway, it was agreed that pedestrians would not be allowed to use the bridge. Even so the opening of the viaduct diverted traffic from other crossings with the Woolston Floating Bridge seeing a significant fall in income.
- Northam Bridge, a road bridge carrying the A3024 road from Bitterne Manor to Northam, which was originally opened in 1799.
- The Itchen Bridge, a high-level toll road bridge connecting the docks area with Woolston. This replaced the Woolston Floating Bridge (a chain ferry) which had previously crossed the river at this point.

Between the latter two, the river passes St Mary's Stadium, the home of Southampton F.C. As the river meets Southampton Water it passes several rowing clubs, sailing clubs and the major mixed-development on the left bank in Woolston, called Centenary Quay.

== Watermills ==
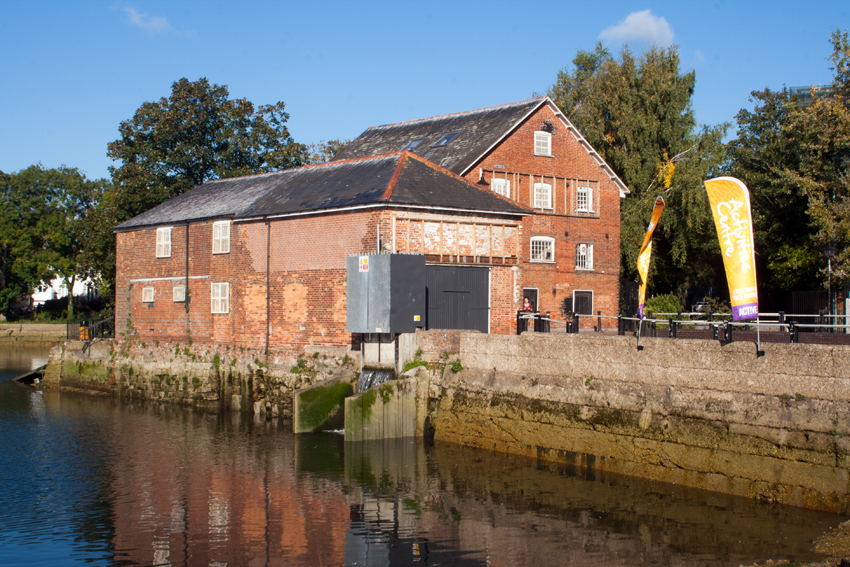
Woodmill, Southampton

Surviving mills on the Itchen include Winchester City Mill (restored to working order by the National Trust), Abbey Mill, Winchester; converted to a restaurant, Wharf Mill, Winchester; converted to apartments, St Cross Mill, Winchester; converted to private dwellings, College Mill, Winchester; converted to a private dwelling, Hockley Mill, Winchester; converted to private dwellings, Gaters Mill, Southampton; converted to offices, and Woodmill, Southampton; now a recreational water activities centre and the limit of navigation. Sites of demolished mills include those at Durngate, Winchester; at the southern entrance to Winnall Moors Nature Reserve, St Catherine's lock, Winchester and Shears Mill in Bishopstoke.

== Marinas and boatyards ==
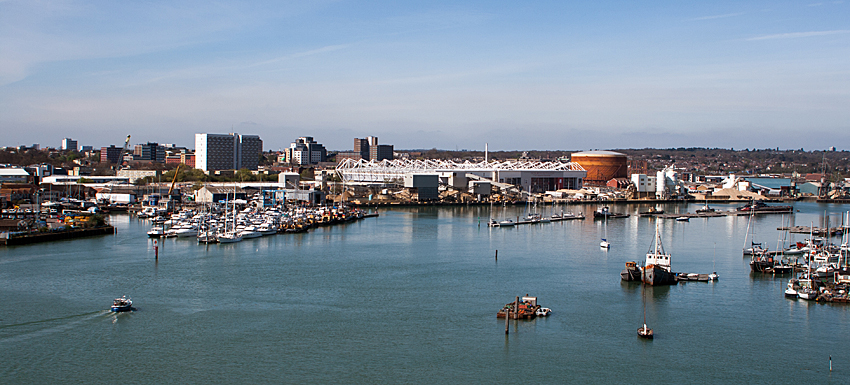
Itchen wharves with St Mary's Stadium

The lower part of the river is an important yachting centre and contains several marinas, sailing centres and boatyards. From seaward they are:

- Ocean Village Marina (MDL), on the western shore just below the Itchen Bridge and close to the city centre
- Southampton Water Activities Centre, almost underneath the bridge on the western shore
- Itchen Marine, just above the bridge, principally a towage business but with some berths for yachts and the only fuel berth in the river
- Merlin Boatyard, opposite Itchen Marine, on the eastern shore
- Lauren Marine Services, a small marina on the eastern side
- Ocean Quay and Solent Breeze Yacht Charter on the west side
- Shamrock Quay (MDL), the biggest marina in the river, also on the west
- Saxon Wharf (MDL) is almost adjacent to Shamrock Quay, containing the biggest boat lift in Britain (200t)
- Kemps Quay Marina on the eastern (now northern) shore, a drying marina and boatyard
- Quayside Marina, a single long pontoon next to Kemps
- Drivers Wharf, another single long pontoon, parallel to the shore, with a crane and boatyard

Above Northam Bridge, the limit of navigation for masted craft, are the Vespasian Road boatyard and numerous small establishments.

== Ecology ==
River Itchen
- Site of Special Scientific Interest
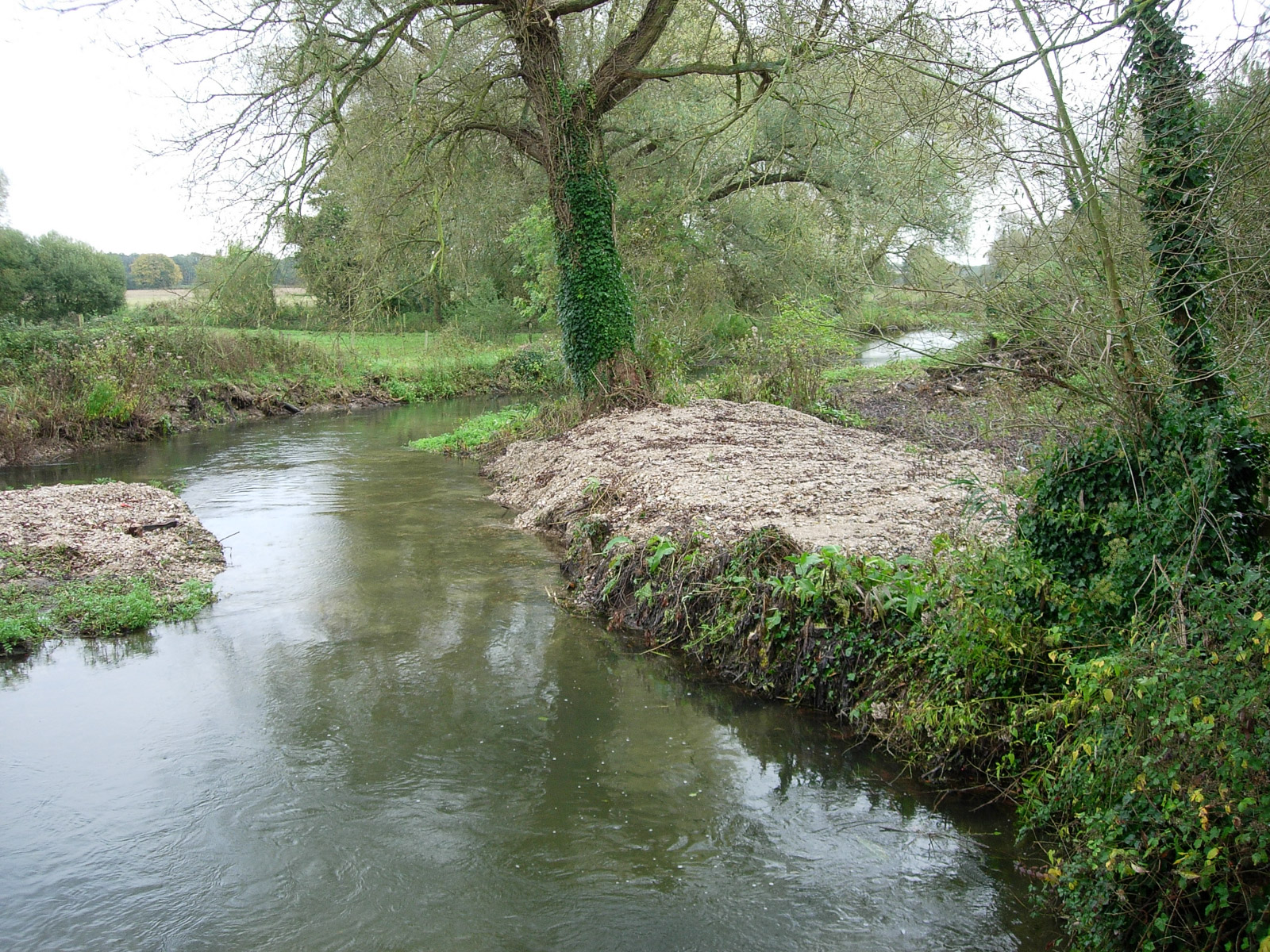
- The river near Bishopstoke
- Location of River Itchen.
- Area of search: Hampshire
- Grid reference: SU 496 261
- Interest: Biological
- Area: 748.5 hectares (1,850 acres)
- Notification date: 2000
- Location map: Magic Map

The SSSI covers the river and its banks, with fen, flood meadows, wet woodland and swamp. It has populations of the nationally rare southern damselfly and white-clawed crayfish. Other fauna include otters, water voles, Atlantic salmon, shovelers and Cetti's warblers.

=== Water quality ===
The Environment Agency measure water quality of the river systems in England. Each is given an overall ecological status, which may be one of five levels: high, good, moderate, poor and bad. There are several components that are used to determine this, including biological status, which looks at the quantity and varieties of invertebrates, angiosperms and fish, and chemical status, which compares the concentrations of various chemicals against known safe concentrations. Chemical status is rated good or fail.

Water quality of the River Itchen in 2022:

Section	Ecological Status	Chemical Status	Overall Status	Length	Catchment	Channel
Itchen	Good	Fail	Moderate	87.94 km (54.64 mi) including all anabranches (unconventional)	119.619 km^{2} (46.185 sq mi)	multi
Itchen (Cheriton Stream)	Good	Fail	Moderate	11.045 km (6.863 mi)	76.892 km^{2} (29.688 sq mi)	multi
Candover Brook	Moderate	Fail	Moderate	9.599 km (5.965 mi)	71.761 km^{2} (27.707 sq mi)	multi
Nun's Walk Stream	Good	Fail	Moderate	3.336 km (2.073 mi)	43.95 km^{2} (16.97 sq mi)	single

== In popular culture ==
Death and the Maiden, a 1947 novel by Gladys Mitchell features the river.

== See also ==
- List of rivers of the United Kingdom
- List of watermills in the United Kingdom
