= Alresford Pond =

Protected area in Hampshire, England

Coordinates: 51.094°N 1.157°W

- Site of Special Scientific Interest
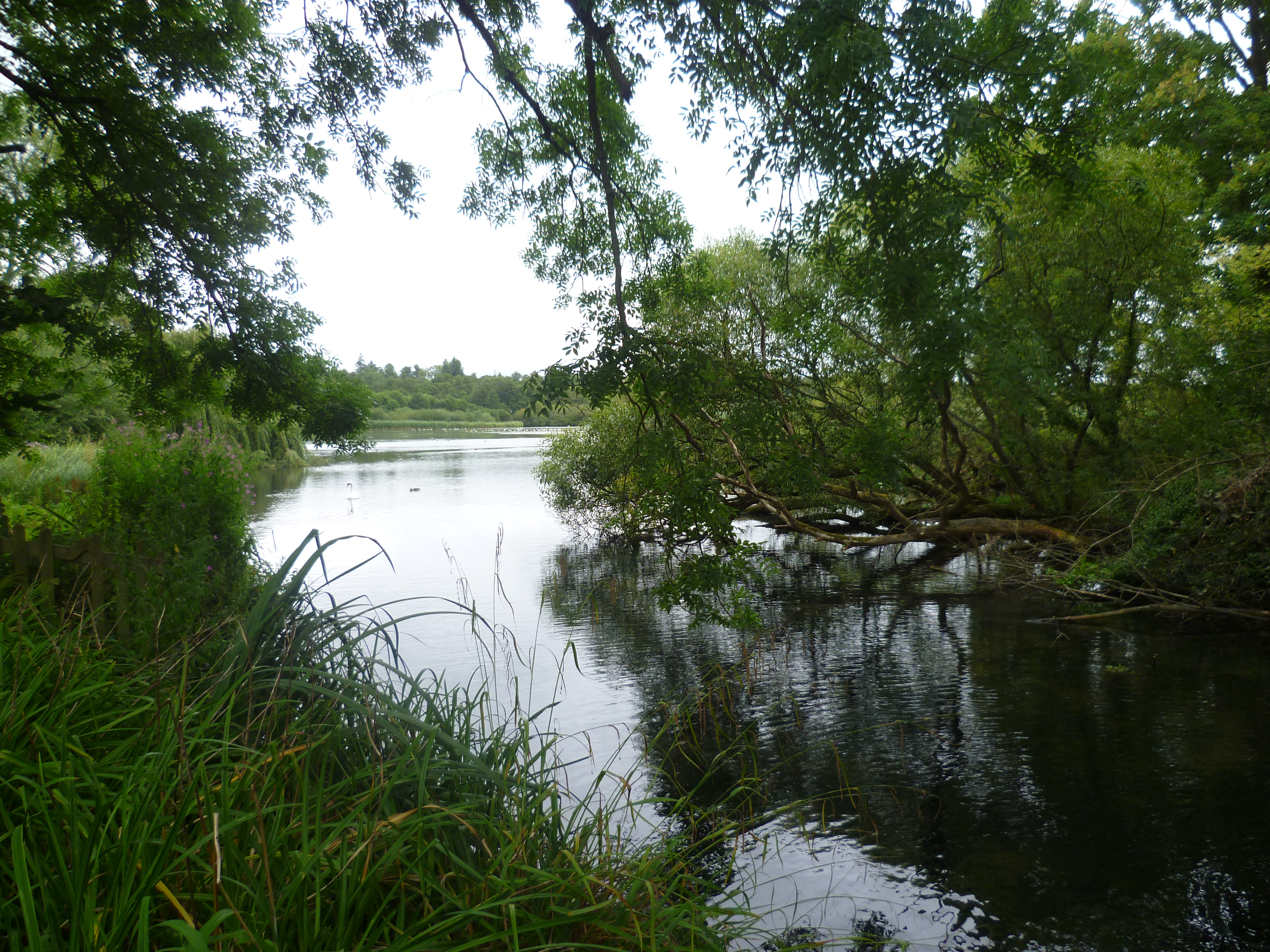
- Location of Alresford Pond.
- Area of search: Hampshire
- Grid reference: SU 591 331
- Interest: Biological
- Area: 30.2 hectares (75 acres)
- Notification date: 1985
- Location map: Magic Map

Alresford Pond is a 30.2-hectare (75-acre) biological Site of Special Scientific Interest on the north side of New Alresford in Hampshire.

This large lake was created by Godfrey de Lucy, who was Bishop of Winchester between 1189 and 1204, to provide a reservoir of water to make the River Itchen navigable. The lake has a rich aquatic plant community and large populations of breeding wetland birds, such as reed warblers and sedge warblers.
