= Dominique Auguste Lereboullet =

French doctor and zoologist

Dominique Auguste Lereboullet was a French medical doctor and zoologist. He was born on 19 September, 1804 at Épinal, and died of an apoplectic fit on 6 October, 1865 in Strasbourg.

He began his studies at Colmar before specialising in medicine at Strasbourg where he graduated as a doctor with a thesis about cholera. While practising medicine, he kept up a series of studies into comparative anatomy of animals. On the departure of Georges Louis Duvernoy to Paris, Lereboullet took the opportunity to occupy the chair of zoology and comparative anatomy at the faculty of science in Strasbourg.

Lereboullet was dean of the Faculty of Sciences and professor of zoology at the University of Strasbourg, as well as the director of Musée zoologique de la ville de Strasbourg (the city's natural history museum). His zoological studies included works on carcinology, foie gras, the comparative embryology of fish, and on the genitalia of vertebrates.
