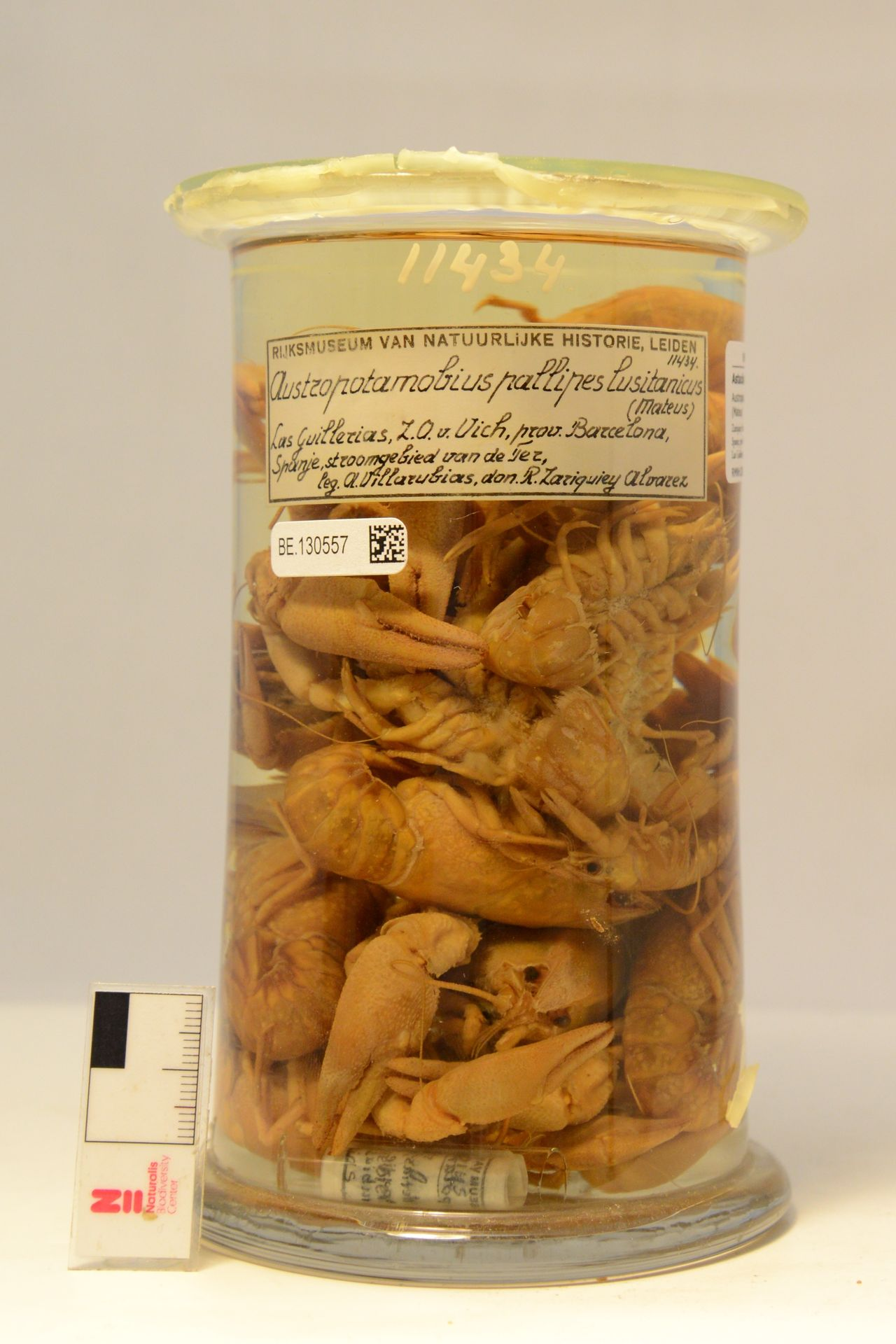

Scientific classification
- Kingdom: Animalia
- Phylum: Arthropoda
- Clade: Pancrustacea
- Class: Malacostraca
- Order: Decapoda
- Suborder: Pleocyemata
- Family: Astacidae
- Genus: Austropotamobius
- Species: A. fulcisianus

Binomial name
- Austropotamobius fulcisianus (Ninni, 1886)

= Austropotamobius fulcisianus =

Species of crayfish

Austropotamobius fulcisianus is a species of freshwater crayfish found in southern Europe.

== Distribution ==
Austropotamobius fulcisianus is found in Italy, Switzerland, Slovenia, Croatia, Bosnia and Herzegovina, Montenegro, and France. Additionally, it was introduced to Spain in the 16th century.
