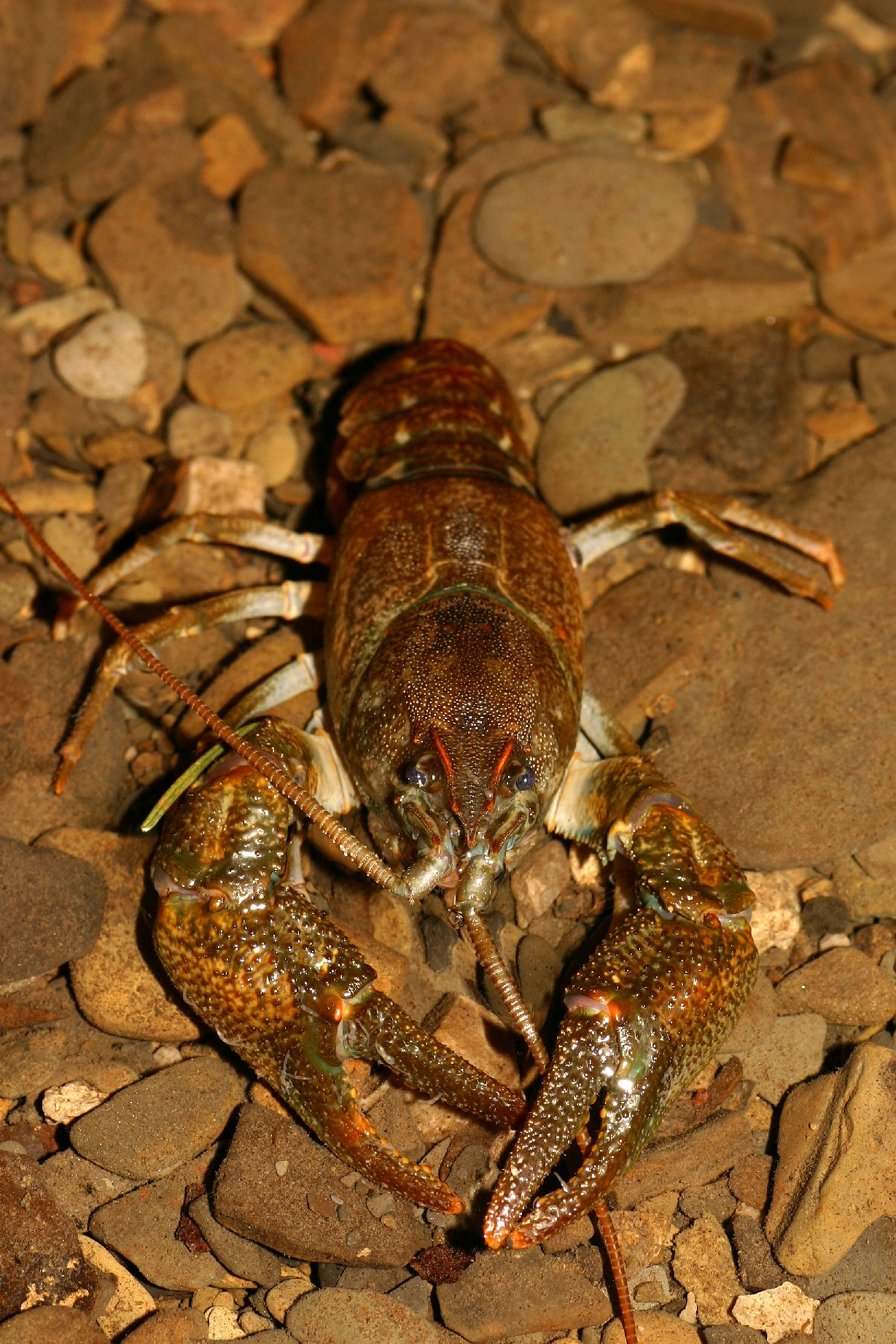

Conservation status
- Least Concern (IUCN 3.1)

Scientific classification
- Kingdom: Animalia
- Phylum: Arthropoda
- Class: Malacostraca
- Order: Decapoda
- Suborder: Pleocyemata
- Family: Astacidae
- Genus: Austropotamobius
- Species: A. torrentium

Binomial name
- Austropotamobius torrentium (Schrank, 1803)

Subspecies
- A. t. torrentium (Schrank, 1803); A. t. danubicus Starobogatov, 1996; A. t. macedonicus Karaman, 1929

Synonyms
- Cancer torrentium Schrank, 1803; Astacus saxatilis Koch, 1835; Astacus tristis Koch, 1835; Astacus longicornis Lereboullet, 1852

= Austropotamobius torrentium =

Species of crayfish

Austropotamobius torrentium, also called the stone crayfish, is a European species of freshwater crayfish in the family Astacidae. It is mostly found in tributaries of the Danube, having originated in the northern part of the Balkan Peninsula.

== Description ==
A. torrentium grows to a length of around 10 centimetres (4 in), and has a smooth brown carapace, with an untoothed triangular rostrum; the underside is creamy white. Males have larger claws than females, but females have a noticeably larger abdomen. As in other crayfish, the first two pairs of pleopods are specialised for sperm transfer in males, while the female's pleopods are uniform and used for brooding eggs.

== Distribution ==
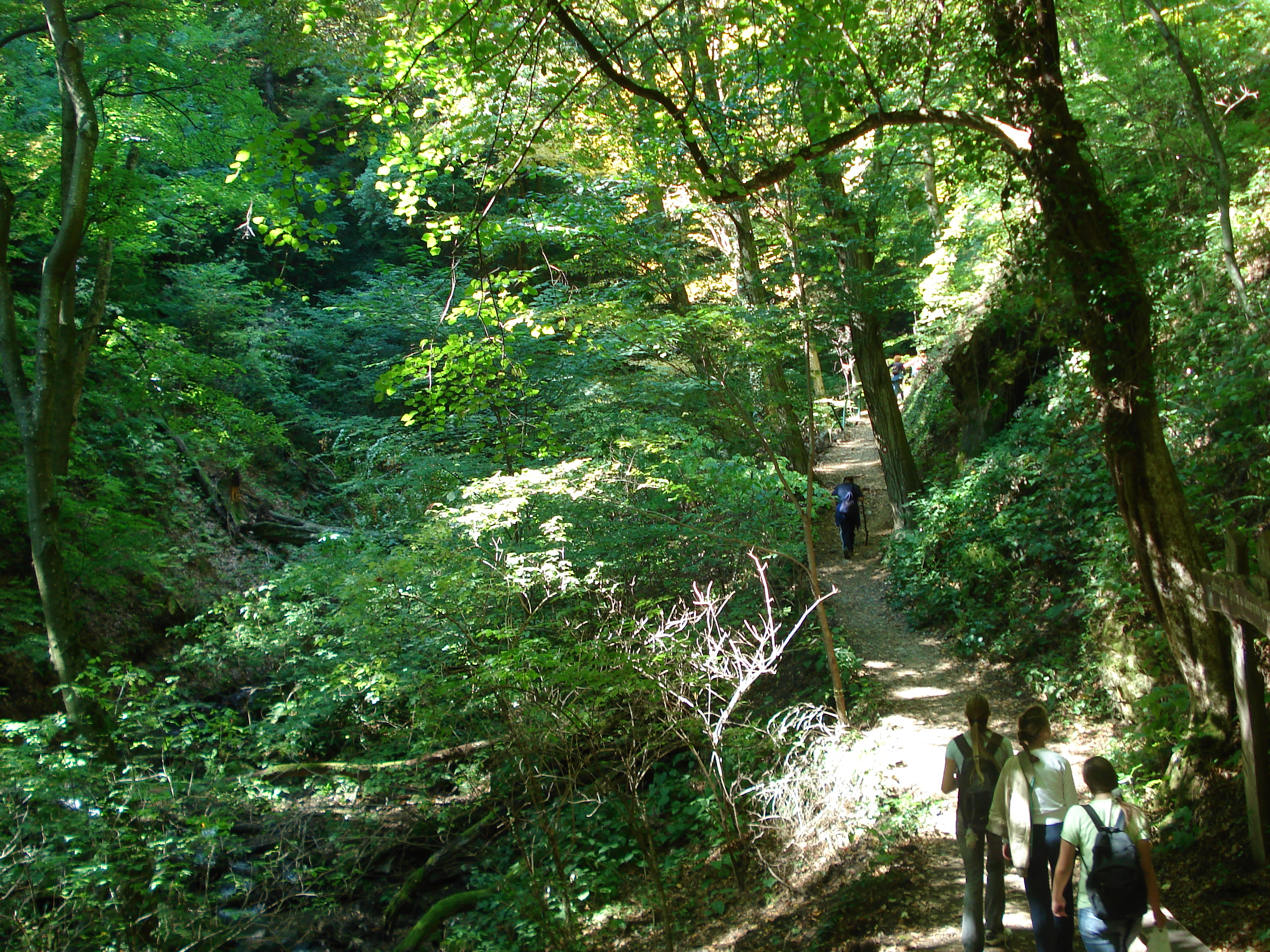
This forest stream on the slopes of Medvednica, Croatia, is typical habitat for Austropotamobius torrentium.

The distribution of A. torrentium is centred on the Danube system, extending from the Olt River in Romania upstream to Germany and Switzerland and into parts of the Rhine and Elbe basins. It is widespread in southern Germany, Switzerland, Austria, Hungary, Slovenia, Croatia, and Serbia. Contrary to some previous records, A. torrentium does not appear to occur in Luxembourg, Poland, or Ukraine.

In France, at the western edge of the species' range, two populations remain, one in Alsace and one in Lorraine. The Czech Republic and Slovakia are at the north-eastern periphery of the natural range of A. torrentium, with only four and six known populations, respectively, all those in Slovakia being in the Male Karpaty hills (Lesser Carpathians). The northernmost point inhabited by A. torrentium is near the city of Dresden in the German federal state of Saxony.

Italy is at the south-western margin of the distribution of A. torrentium, with at least two populations in the Slizza drainage (a tributary of the Danube) near Tarvisio. To the south-east, the species has entered the Drin River in Albania, and was discovered in 2005 in the European part of Turkey. In Romania, it is present in the Apuseni Mountains and the Carpathian foothills to the southwest, overlapping slightly with the distribution of the noble crayfish Astacus astacus.

The populations in the west of the species' range are genetically depauperate, while populations from the upper Kupa basin are as genetically distinct from the rest of A. torrentium as some species in related genera are from each other, suggesting A. torrentium originated in the Western Balkans.

== Ecology ==
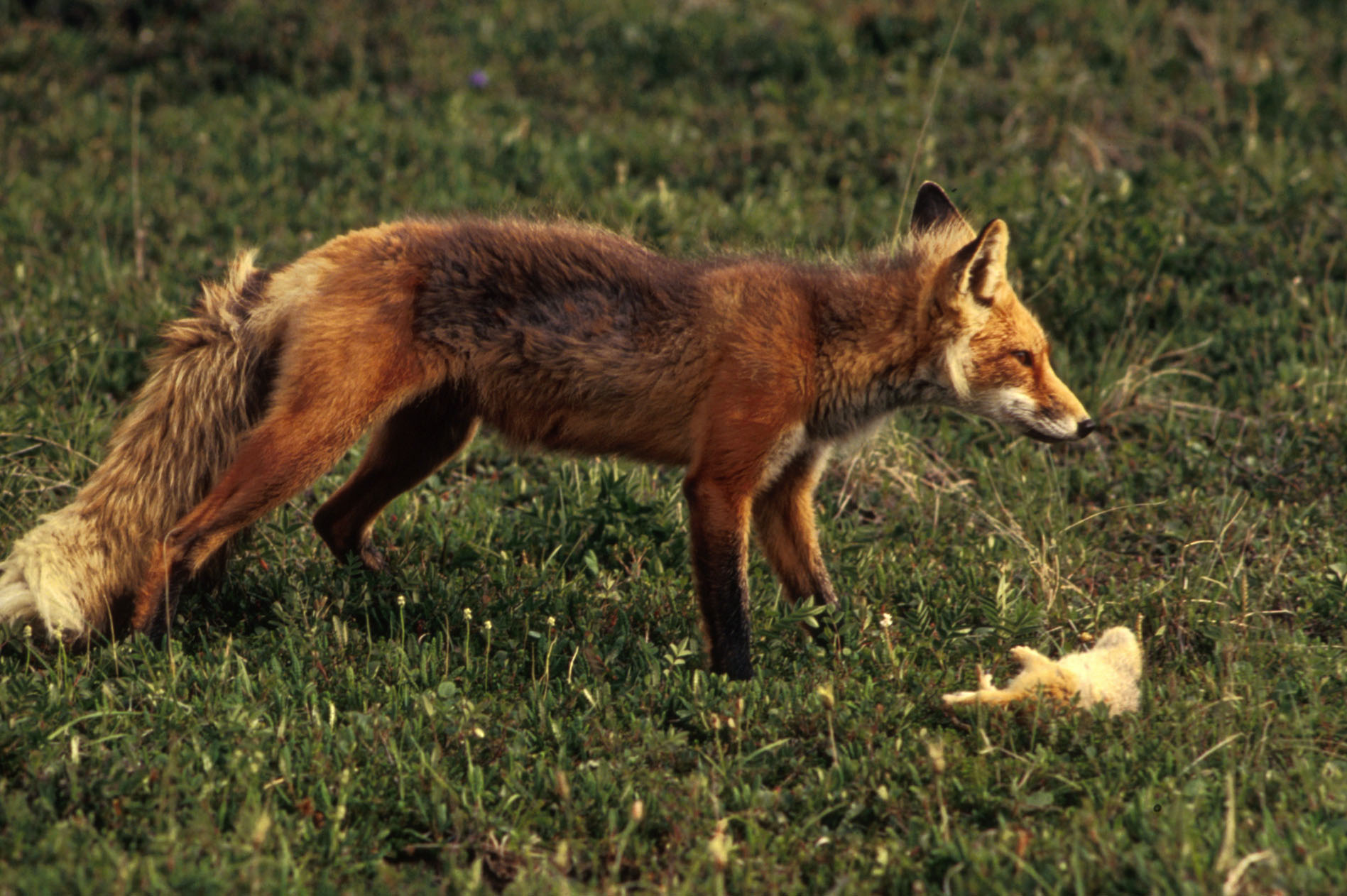
The red fox, Vulpes vulpes, is an important predator of adult crayfish.

The preferred habitat of A. torrentium is cold, fast-flowing streams, although some live in larger rivers and lakes. It digs burrows in the banks and hides under submerged roots or rocks, emerging at night to feed.

Adult A. torrentium consume a variety of plant materials, including fallen leaves, while the juveniles chiefly feed on aquatic invertebrates. Natural predators of fully grown A. torrentium include foxes, bears, wolves, otters, and badgers, while the young animals are targeted by fish. The species is sensitive to low levels of dissolved oxygen, and to chemical pollution.

Besides naturally occurring threats, A. torrentium has also suffered from the introduction of the crayfish plague, Asphanomyces astaci, carried by invasive crayfish species from North America, and from the release of detergents into streams while washing laundry.

== Life cycle ==
Mating takes place at the end of October. The female then carries the 40–70 fertilised eggs on her pleopods until the eggs are ready to hatch. Juveniles moult up to 4 or 5 times per year, but as they mature, this slows to once or twice a year, usually in May, June, or July. Sexual maturity is reached after 3 to 5 years, by which time the animal has grown to a length of 35–50 millimetres (1.4–2.0 in). Adult males can reproduce every year, but females do not reproduce for at least one year after producing eggs.

== Conservation status ==
A. torrentium is one of the most threatened species in Europe: as well as protection under various national laws, it is designated Least Concern on the IUCN Red List, it is listed in Appendix III of the Bern Convention, and it is protected under the EU Habitats Directive.
