= New Alresford =

Market town in Hampshire, England

Coordinates: 51°05′27″N 1°09′40″W

- Market town
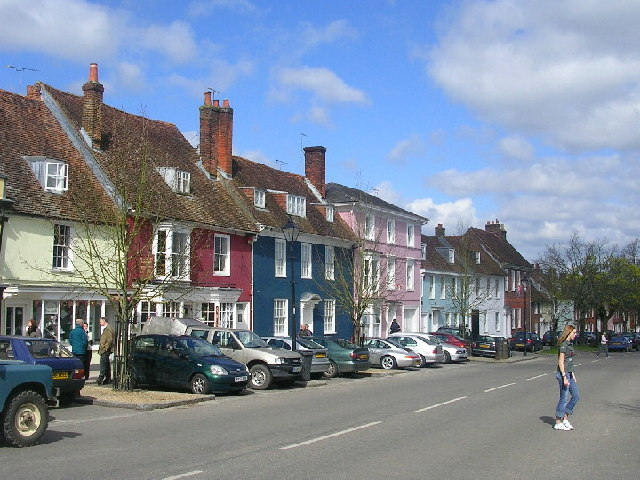
- Broad Street, New Alresford

- Location within Hampshire
- Population: 5,431 (2011 Census)
- OS grid reference: SU 58 32
- District: City of Winchester
- Shire county: Hampshire
- Region: South East
- Country: England
- Sovereign state: United Kingdom
- Post town: ALRESFORD
- Postcode district: SO24
- Dialling code: 01962
- Police: Hampshire and Isle of Wight
- Fire: Hampshire and Isle of Wight
- Ambulance: South Central
- UK Parliament: Winchester

New Alresford or simply Alresford (/ˈɒlzfərd/ OLZ-fərd or /ˈɔːlzfərd/ AWLZ-fərd) is a market town and civil parish in the City of Winchester district of Hampshire, England. It is 8.0 miles (12.9 km) northeast of Winchester and 12 miles (20 km) southwest of the town of Alton.

New Alresford, situated with the River Alre to its north, has a preserved 17th and 18th Century high street which offers several shops, a tourist information centre, a central conservation area, and several tea rooms and pubs. The western terminus of the Watercress Line heritage railway is at Alresford railway station in the town.

== Etymology ==
Although Alresford is recorded in several Anglo-Saxon charters these records are in reference to Old Alresford the older of the two settlements. Alresford derived from the Old English Alor and ford meaning the ford at the alder tree.

New Alresford itself was founded as a market town in 1189 and is first mentioned in a record of the mid 1200s as Nova Villa de Alresford, Latin for the "new settlement of Alresford". In 1332 Chepyng Alresford is recorded denoting a market town, from Middle English chippyng.

== History ==
There is evidence of Neolithic, Bronze Age and Iron Age occupation on several sites in the Alresford area, with a Roman or Romano-British site on nearby Fobdown and to the south-east of the town in Bramdean. Alresford was listed in the Domesday Book but this refers to what is now Old Alresford a short distance to the north of the river. Old Alresford is near to the Pilgrims' Way between Winchester and Canterbury which from Alresford goes east to Farnham, Guildford, Dorking and Maidstone.

An Early Medieval Anglo-Saxon cemetery was discovered during pre-construction excavations near Sun Lane to the southeast of Alresford. Of the total 120 graves, many contained prestige objects like swords or in some cases even golden disc pendant. Its presence as one of the largest cemeteries of its date in Hampshire suggests significant occupation in the surrounding area prior to the founding of New Alresford.

New Alresford was founded in the 12th/13th century, the idea originally being that of Henri de Blois, the Bishop of Winchester and brother of King Stephen of England. The design of the town (originally named Novum Forum) was followed by de Blois' successor Godfrey de Lucy. Alresford was one of the Bishop's six new towns and was his most profitable — one of his residences was situated in Bishop's Sutton about a mile to the east.

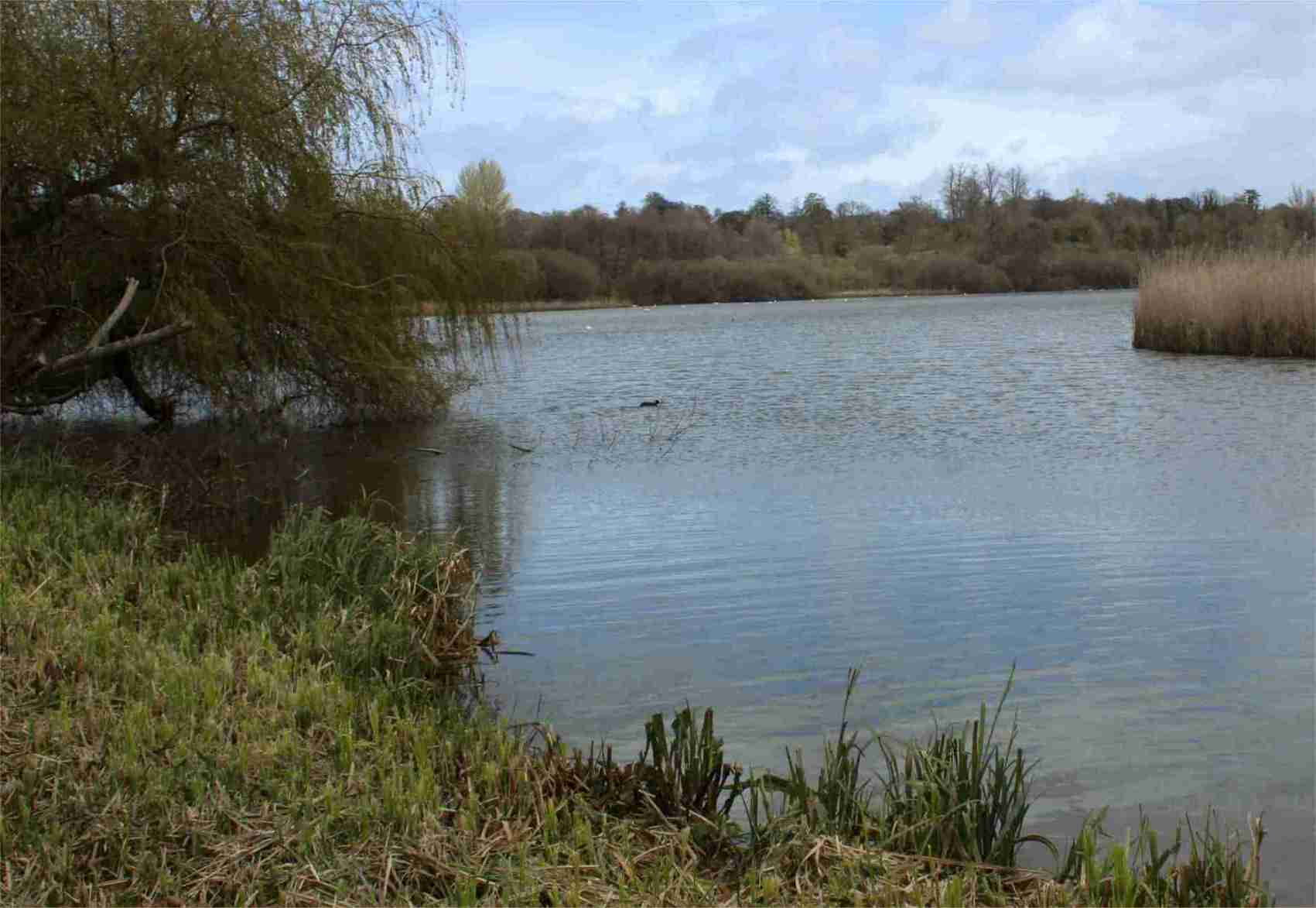
Alresford Pond

This expansion also involved the construction of the Great Weir, an earth dam across the river south of Old Alresford, allowing the river to form Alresford Pond on what is now the north side of New Alresford village.Today, Alresford pond is at the centre of a 30.2-hectare (75-acre) biological Site of Special Scientific Interest.

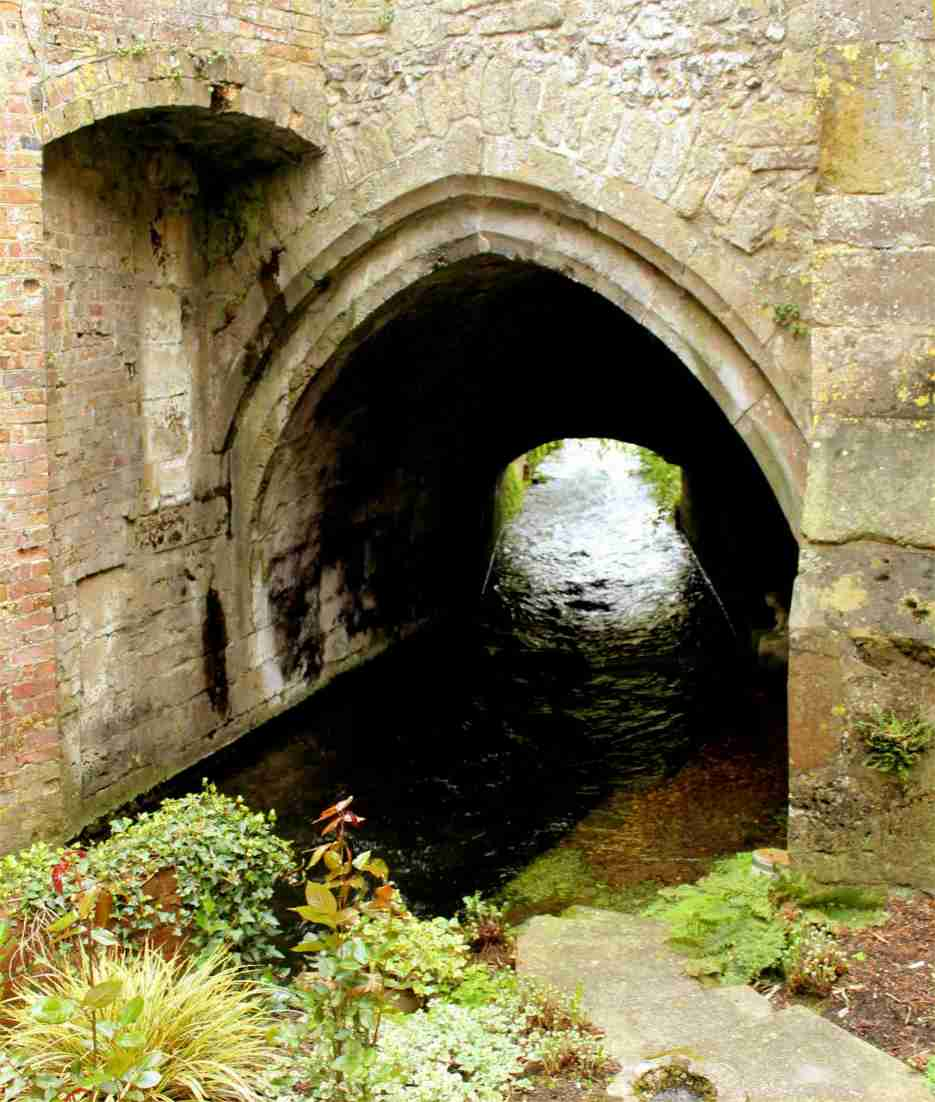
Medieval bridge looking upstream towards the pond

A medieval stone bridge said to have been built about 1190 built is still in place on the north side of New Alresford and the flow of water through is the main outflow from Alresford Pond.

New Alresford became established as a prosperous market town on the main road from Alton to Winchester south of the river. Commerce focussed on products from sheep and cattle such as wool and leather; and in the 14th century Alresford sheep markets were said to produce one of five highest turnovers in England.

Alresford sent two members to parliament until the population was reduced by the Black Death in 1348. In the 17th century the town made news as a dangerous place to live due to the uncommonly frequent fires which razed it; in the spring of 1644, the Battle of Cheriton took place on Cheriton Down, reaching the outskirts of Alresford.

Much of the medieval town was destroyed by a fire in 1689/90 that destroyed 117 houses in the town as well as the church and Market House, another in 1710 and a 'like calamity' in 1736. Much of the town was rebuilt in the 18th century, with many of the Georgian buildings that remain today.

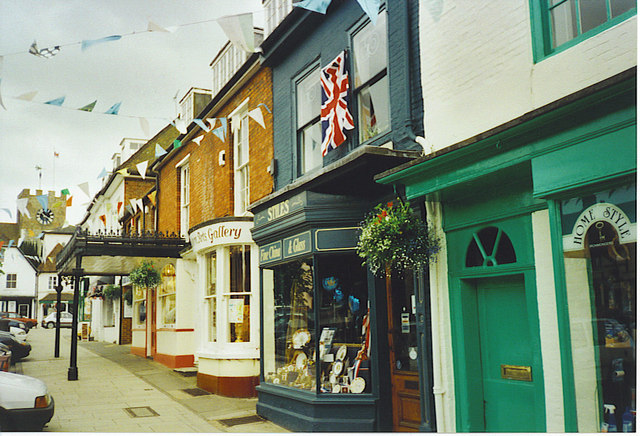
Shop Fronts, Broad Street

A turnpike toll road linking London to primarily Southampton but viable for Hamble and Portsmouth (now the A31), some of which was a Roman road then a track in variable condition maintained by each parish, was built in 1753, passing through the town.

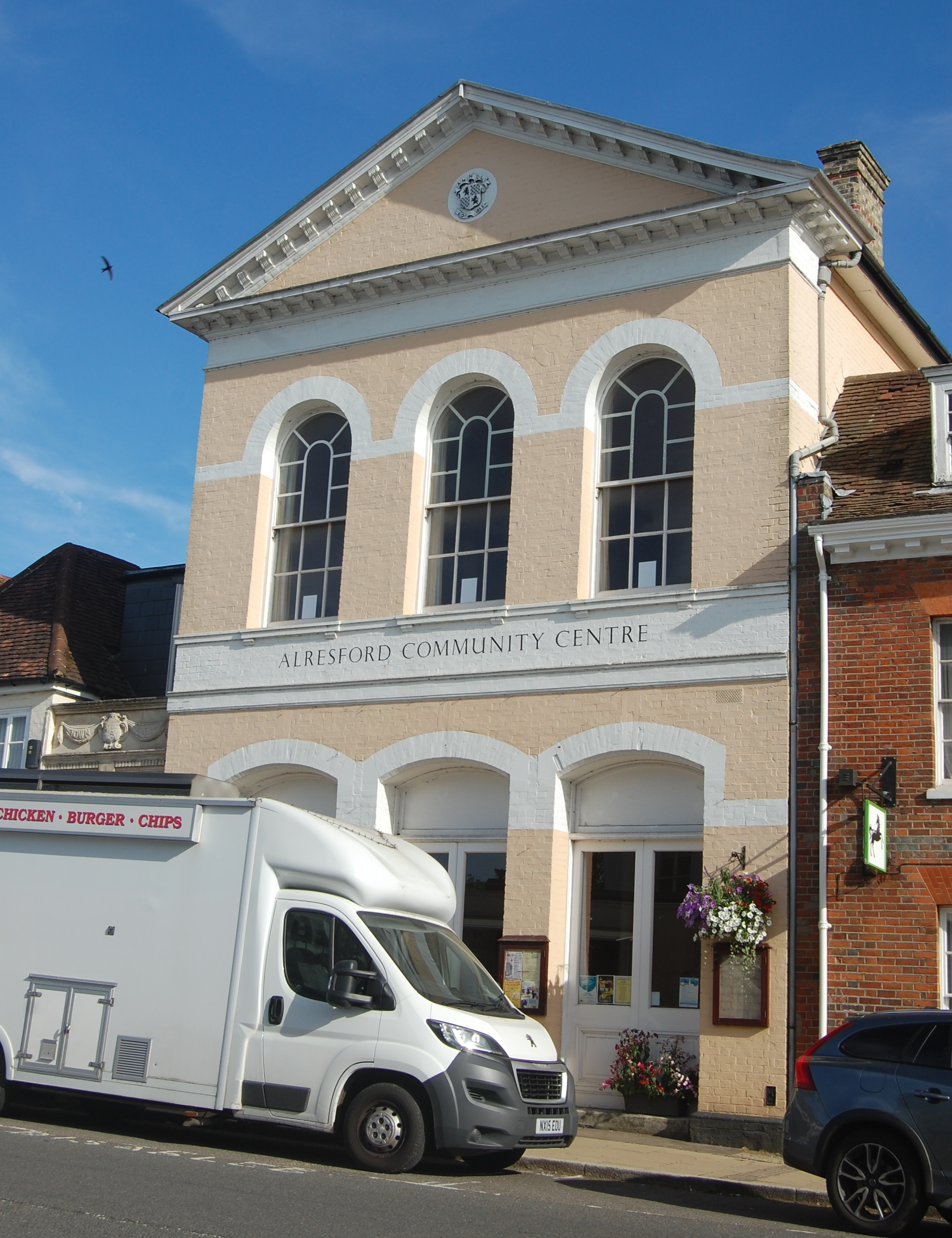
Alresford Community Centre

During the late 18th century, Alresford Cricket Club was one of the strongest sides in England. Alresford Community Centre, formerly Alresford Town Hall, was completed in 1865.

During the Second World War US Soldiers from the 47th Infantry Regiment were stationed in and around Alresford from 1943 to 1944 prior to the D-Day Landings. The regimental HQ was situated in Broad street. There is a memorial to their mascot Hambone jr. alongside the river path and a plaque on the former HQ building.

A Cold War commemorative plaque on the wall of public toilets, close to the railway station, commemorates that occasionally secret military documents obtained by members of the Portland Soviet spy ring in the early 1960s were left here for collection.

== Art and tourism ==
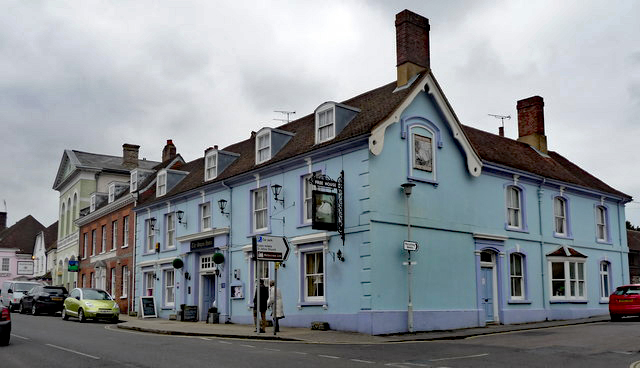
The Swan Hotel

The town, crowned by its large T-shaped main street conservation area, is an attractive art, rail and tourist destination, with its two classical, dense Georgian streets. Here can be found the Swan Hotel, Bell Hotel, jewellers, wine merchants, butchers, flower shops, toy shop, dress shops, the Alresford Gallery, Candover Gallery and tea rooms. There are three other public houses, the largest being the Globe Inn, by one of the stream channels and the play area.

=== Alresford railway station ===
Alresford railway station is at the south-western end of the Watercress Line – officially the Mid-Hants Railway. This heritage railway line runs steam and diesel trains, and gained its nickname from the fact that it used to be the line that took locally grown watercress up to London. The other end of the heritage line is Alton, which is also the terminus of the Alton line, enabling rail access for visitors from London.

=== St John's Church ===
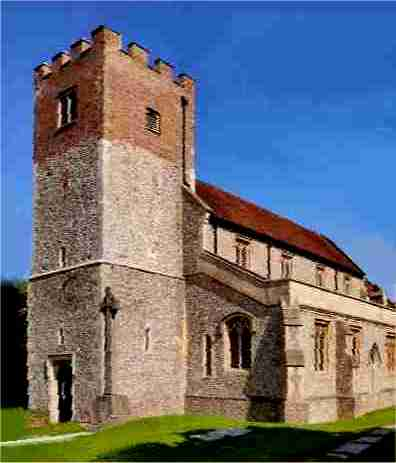
St John's Church, New Alresford

The 13th-century church of St John the Baptist was rebuilt in 1898 by Sir Arthur Blomfield in the Norman gothic perpendicular style, except the 14th-century tower, although the top third of the tower is of 16th-century red crenellated parapet brickwork.

=== Brandy Mount House ===
Brandy Mount House is a Grade II listed building and is a short distance east of the church. In 2012 it was holding a National Plant Collection of snowdrops in its grounds. The gardens were open to the public during the season.

=== Water Cascade ===
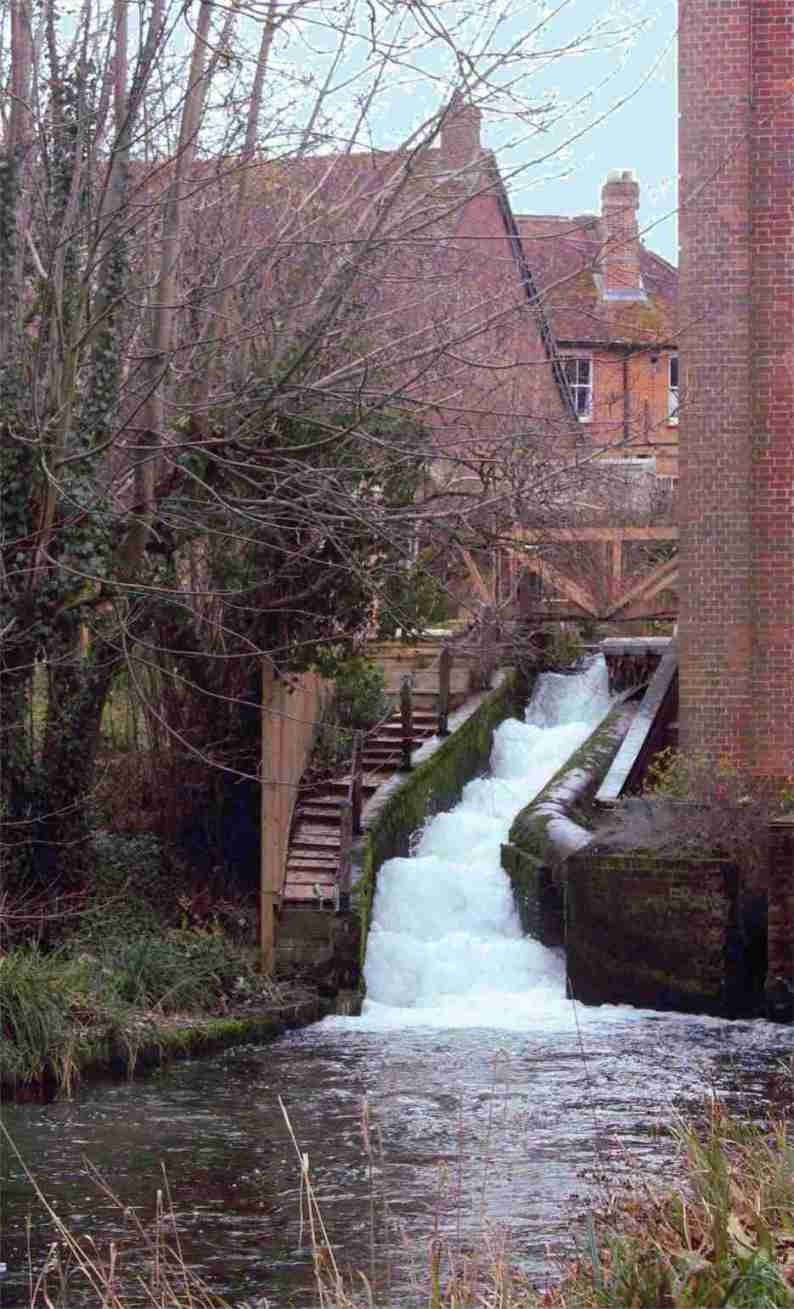
Alresford cascade

The overflow from New Alresford Pond flows down a stepped cascade at Mill Hill, then travels downstream to the river Itchen.

=== Itchen Valley brewery ===
The Itchen Valley brewery was founded in New Alresford in 1997. The brewery produced a range of cask ales and a selection of beers which until early 2006 were bottle conditioned by Gales Brewery. The brewery closed in 2021, a victim of poor trading during Covid.

=== The Fulling Mill ===
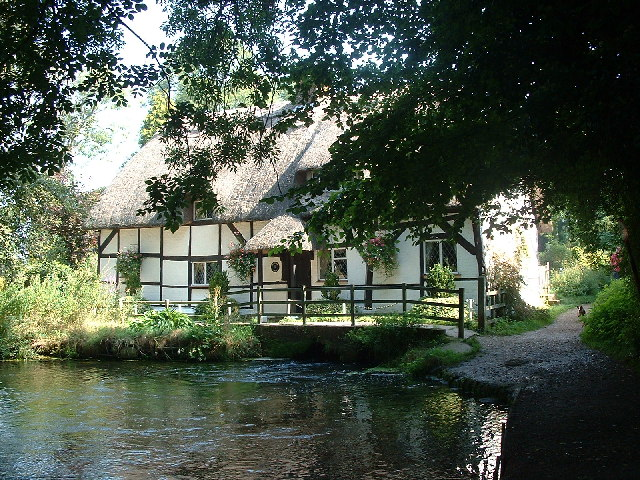
The Fulling Mill

About 220 yards (200 m) west along the river path, on the border between Old and New Alresford, is a Grade II listed 17th Century half-timbered house and mill with mill race underneath. It benefited from the construction of the Great Weir. Dating from the period when the wool trade was the dominant local industry, it ceased operating early in the 19th century and has been used as a domestic dwelling ever since. In 1950 it was acquired by Mr and Mrs G B Gush, who carried out a series of improvements to the property.

== Education ==
There is one infant, one junior and one secondary school in Alresford with more than 140 staff and 2,000 pupils – Perins School (1,200 pupils –secondary school). This school converted to Academy status in 2011 and in September 2017 formed a Multi-Academy Trust (MAT) with Sun Hill Junior School. In 2001 Perins was granted specialist status for leading the field in sport in Hampshire. This enabled Perins to open and complete a new state-of-art gym open to the public in the evenings, although the school no longer carries the title Community Sports College.

== Sport and leisure ==
Alresford has a Non-League football club Alresford Town F.C., which plays at Arlebury Park. Alresford is also home to a rugby club, Alresford RFC, which plays its home games at Arlebury Park in the centre of Alresford.

== Transport ==
New Alresford was formerly on both the A31 road between Guildford and Winchester, and on the Watercress Line, a secondary main line of the London & South Western Railway between Alton and Winchester. However the A31 now by-passes the town, whilst the old road through the town has been redesignated the B3047. The Watercress Line was closed in 1973, although the section between New Alresford and Alton is now operated as a heritage railway under the same name.

The town is served by a two bus routes operated by Stagecoach in Hampshire including the half hourly number 64 (now covering the full route of the discontinued 64X) bus between Winchester and Alton via New Alresford and the number 67 providing a more limited service between Winchester and Petersfield via New Alresford.

== Events ==
Alresford holds a number of community events throughout the year. Several are organised by or with New Alresford Town Council (NATC). All events which are held in the main streets within the original town (Broad Street, East Street, West Street) require the permission of the New Alresford Town Trust (NATT – a registered charity which preserves the town's traditional rights of access, to fairs and to street markets, preserves old documents and buildings, and runs a community minibus). A fee for street usage is usually payable by organisers, which helps in the Trust's other works, including running the local minibus which serves the elderly and disabled. A number of events are organised by The Alresford Pigs Association, which raises money in the local area for those in need, by the local Rotary club (such as the annual 5 November Fireworks at Arlebury Park), and by the town council.

=== The Watercress Festival ===
The town is famed for its production of watercress and is recognised as The Capital of Watercress. Once a year New Alresford holds a festival on the third Sunday in May which attracts an enormous crowd; there is a street market with locally made food on sale and usually cookery demonstrations. From 2006 to 2008, Antony Worrall Thompson was the celebrity chef.

=== Alresford Show ===
The agricultural show, founded in 1908 and held at Tichborne Park since 1960, takes place on the first Saturday in September. Animals are shown, flowers and vegetables are judged, there is horsejumping and other entertainment. The Alresford Pigs and Alresford Rugby Club assist. Entry is chargeable.

=== Alresford fair ===
A one-day street fair takes place on 11 October (Old Michaelmas Day) or the first Thursday thereafter. The traditional English funfair, arrives on Wednesday afternoon and Thursday morning and sets up in Broad Street. The fair lasts from 3pm – 11pm and has to be gone by dawn on Friday. The main north–south road of Alresford (Broad Street) is closed to traffic.

=== Bonfire night ===
Organised by the local Rotary Club and usually held on 5 November. Traditionally the firework display is preceded by a torchlit procession starting in Broad Street making its way along West Street and up Pound Hill into Arlebury Park, the venue for the firework display. The display is always well attended with proceeds donated to local, national and international causes. Each year a 'Guy' is burned following tradition, with the Guys made by local schoolchildren.

=== Arrival of Father Christmas ===
The arrival of Father Christmas is a joint effort led by the Christmas Tree Fund. It takes place in Broad Street near a large Christmas Tree erected annually. A carol service with music provided by Perins Community School's orchestra precedes the arrival. The Alresford Pigs create the secret process by which Father Christmas arrives. He has arrived in World War 2 NAAFI van driven by Wallace and Gromit and in a Thunderbirds, helicopter, fire engine, Open-top bus, Tardis, and a BMW 5 Series. This is followed by Father Christmas giving presents to children in his grotto. The presents are organised by the Christmas Tree Fund. Money donated by the crowd at each year's event goes back into the pot for the following year.

=== The Duck Race ===
The Duck Race is organised by the Alresford Pigs and held biennially on odd numbered years. It brings the community out to watch several (decoy) duck races with 32 ducks in each race. The event, races and ducks are sponsored by a local family or business. It has been held for many years on the lawn at the Weir House, which has space for traditional fete activities such as Tea and Cake, Beer Tent, Tombola, as well as Scalextric Racing, Face Painting, Bouncy Castle, and Jazz Band. This is the largest fundraising event organised by The Alresford Pigs.

== Charity ==
After the borough council was abolished under the Municipal Corporations Act 1883, its assets were transferred to the New Alresford Town Trust, which was constituted in 1890.

== Governance ==
Alresford is part of the wider Itchen Valley Ward of Hampshire County Council, which stretches across the Northeast of the City of Winchester and includes several other parishes such as Itchen Valley. Itchen Valley has been represented since 2005 by Jackie Porter, most recently elected in 2017:

Itchen Valley
Party	Candidate	Votes	%	±%
Liberal Democrats	Jackie Porter	3558	55	
Conservative	Ernest David Jeffs	2617	40	
Green	Chris Hesketh-Roberts	190	3	
Labour	Richard Williams James	157	2	
Majority		941		
Turnout		6522	51	
Liberal Democrats hold		Swing		

Alresford also elects three representatives to the City of Winchester District Council as part of the wider Alresford and Itchen Valley Ward. As with the Hampshire County Council War, this also includes Old Alresford. The ward is currently represented by one Conservative Councillor and two Liberal Democrat Councillors:

Election	Member	Ward
2024	Clare Pinneger	Alresford & Itchen Valley
2018	Margot Power	Alresford & Itchen Valley
2019	Russell Gordon-Smith	Alresford & Itchen Valley

The town council holds elections, and is currently composed of eleven Councillors and six members of staff.

== Notable people ==
- Alresford was the birthplace of artist Graham Ovenden, novelist and dramatist Mary Russell Mitford (1787–1855) who lived at 27 Broad street until the age of ten, and of John Frederick Peel Rawlinson (1860–1926), lawyer, politician, and goalkeeper for Old Etonians F.C. in three early FA Cup Finals.
- South African cricketer Owen Robert Dunell (1856–1929) lived at Alresford in later life.
- The cricket commentator John Arlott resided in Alresford between 1961 and 1981.
- Alexa Chung, model and presenter, attended Perins Secondary School, as did Russell Howard, comedian.
- Formula One racing driver Derek Warwick is from a local family.
- Kate Walsh, runner up on the 2009 series of The Apprentice and presenter on Live from Studio Five lives in Alresford.
- The award-winning actor Colin Firth used to live in Alresford as a young boy.
- In February 1835, Henry 'Orator' Hunt visited New Alresford in Hampshire on business. As he got down from his phaeton outside the George Inn, he suffered a stroke and was taken to a private room. He died a few days later on Friday, 13 February, surrounded by his family and friends.

== Twin towns ==
New Alresford is twinned with:

- Bricquebec, France
