= List of United Kingdom locations: West M-Wey =

The United Kingdom

This is part of the list of United Kingdom locations: a gazetteer of place names in the United Kingdom showing each place's locality and geographical coordinates.

== West (continued) ==
=== West M ===
Location	Locality	Coordinates (links to map & photo sources)	OS grid reference
West Mains	Scottish Borders	55.70°N 02.71°W	NT5546
West Mains	South Lanarkshire	55.76°N 04.20°W	NS6254
West Malling	Kent	51.28°N 00.40°E	TQ6857
West Malvern	Worcestershire	52.11°N 02.35°W	SO7646
Westmancote	Worcestershire	52.03°N 02.10°W	SO9337
West Marden	West Sussex	50.91°N 00.90°W	SU7713
West Marina	East Sussex	50.84°N 00.52°E	TQ7808
West Markham	Nottinghamshire	53.24°N 00.92°W	SK7272
Westmarsh	Kent	51.30°N 01.25°E	TR2761
West Marsh	North East Lincolnshire	53.56°N 00.11°W	TA2509
West Marton	North Yorkshire	53.94°N 02.16°W	SD8950
West Melbury	Dorset	50.97°N 02.20°W	ST8620
West Melton	Rotherham	53.49°N 01.36°W	SE4200
West Meon	Hampshire	51.01°N 01.08°W	SU6424
West Meon Woodlands	Hampshire	51.02°N 01.08°W	SU6426
West Mersea	Essex	51.77°N 00.91°E	TM0112
Westmeston	East Sussex	50.90°N 00.10°W	TQ3313
Westmill (East Hertfordshire)	Hertfordshire	51.92°N 00.02°W	TL3627
Westmill (Hitchin)	Hertfordshire	51.95°N 00.29°W	TL1730
West Milton	Dorset	50.76°N 02.71°W	SY5096
West Minster	Kent	51.42°N 00.74°E	TQ9173
Westminster	City of Westminster	51.49°N 00.14°W	TQ2979
West Molesey	Surrey	51.39°N 00.37°W	TQ1368
West Monkseaton	North Tyneside	55.03°N 01.48°W	NZ3371
West Monkton	Somerset	51.04°N 03.05°W	ST2628
West Moor	North Tyneside	55.02°N 01.57°W	NZ2770
Westmoor End	Cumbria	54.73°N 03.39°W	NY1039
West Moors	Dorset	50.81°N 01.88°W	SU0802
West Morden	Dorset	50.75°N 02.14°W	SY9095
West Morton	Bradford	53.87°N 01.86°W	SE0942
West Mudford	Somerset	50.97°N 02.62°W	ST5620
Westmuir	Angus	56.65°N 03.04°W	NO3652
West Muir	Angus	56.73°N 02.72°W	NO5661

=== West N ===
Location	Locality	Coordinates (links to map & photo sources)	OS grid reference
West Ness	North Yorkshire	54.20°N 00.94°W	SE6979
Westnewton	Cumbria	54.78°N 03.35°W	NY1344
Westnewton	Northumberland	55.56°N 02.16°W	NT9030
West Newton	East Riding of Yorkshire	53.81°N 00.19°W	TA1937
West Newton	Norfolk	52.81°N 00.50°E	TF6927
West Newton	Somerset	51.05°N 03.02°W	ST2829
West Norwood	Lambeth	51.42°N 00.10°W	TQ3271

=== West O ===
Location	Locality	Coordinates (links to map & photo sources)	OS grid reference
Westoe	South Tyneside	54.98°N 01.42°W	NZ3766
West Ogwell	Devon	50.51°N 03.66°W	SX8270
Weston	Bath and North East Somerset	51.39°N 02.40°W	ST7266
Weston	Berkshire	51.45°N 01.44°W	SU3973
Weston	Bradford	53.91°N 01.74°W	SE1746
Weston (Cheshire East)	Cheshire	53.24°N 02.16°W	SJ8972
Weston (Runcorn)	Cheshire	53.31°N 02.75°W	SJ5080
Weston (Awliscombe)	Devon	50.79°N 03.22°W	ST1400
Weston (Sidmouth)	Devon	50.68°N 03.19°W	SY1688
Weston (Corscombe)	Dorset	50.84°N 02.71°W	ST5005
Weston (Tophill)	Dorset	50.53°N 02.45°W	SY6871
Weston	Herefordshire	52.19°N 02.93°W	SO3656
Weston	Hertfordshire	51.95°N 00.16°W	TL2630
Weston	Lincolnshire	52.79°N 00.10°W	TF2824
Weston	Northamptonshire	52.10°N 01.15°W	SP5846
Weston	Nottinghamshire	53.19°N 00.84°W	SK7767
Weston	Pembrokeshire	51.75°N 04.87°W	SN0210
Weston	Powys	52.35°N 02.99°W	SO3273
Weston (Monkhopton)	Shropshire	52.52°N 02.60°W	SO5992
Weston (Oswestry Rural)	Shropshire	52.83°N 03.05°W	SJ2927
Weston (Weston-under-Redcastle)	Shropshire	52.84°N 02.65°W	SJ5628
Weston	South Lanarkshire	55.70°N 03.54°W	NT0347
Weston	City of Southampton	50.88°N 01.37°W	SU4410
Weston	Staffordshire	52.84°N 02.04°W	SJ9727
Weston	Suffolk	52.42°N 01.55°E	TM4287
Weston Bampfylde	Somerset	51.01°N 02.55°W	ST6124
Weston Beggard	Herefordshire	52.06°N 02.61°W	SO5841
Westonbirt	Gloucestershire	51.59°N 02.21°W	ST8589
Weston by Welland	Northamptonshire	52.51°N 00.86°W	SP7791
Weston Colley	Hampshire	51.14°N 01.28°W	SU5039
Weston Colville	Cambridgeshire	52.15°N 00.35°E	TL6153
Weston Common	City of Southampton	50.89°N 01.34°W	SU4611
Westoncommon	Shropshire	52.82°N 02.86°W	SJ4226
Weston Corbett	Hampshire	51.21°N 01.02°W	SU6847
Weston Coyney	City of Stoke-on-Trent	52.99°N 02.10°W	SJ9344
Weston Ditch	Suffolk	52.36°N 00.45°E	TL6777
Weston Favell	Northamptonshire	52.25°N 00.84°W	SP7962
Weston Green	Cambridgeshire	52.14°N 00.36°E	TL6252
Weston Green	Norfolk	52.68°N 01.10°E	TG1014
Weston Green	Surrey	51.38°N 00.34°W	TQ1566
Weston Heath	Shropshire	52.71°N 02.34°W	SJ7713
Weston Hills	Lincolnshire	52.76°N 00.10°W	TF2820
Weston in Arden	Warwickshire	52.47°N 01.44°W	SP3887
Westoning	Bedfordshire	51.97°N 00.50°W	TL0332
Weston in Gordano	North Somerset	51.46°N 02.80°W	ST4474
Weston Jones	Staffordshire	52.81°N 02.35°W	SJ7624
Weston Longville	Norfolk	52.69°N 01.12°E	TG1115
Weston Lullingfields	Shropshire	52.81°N 02.86°W	SJ4224
Weston Manor	Isle of Wight	50.67°N 01.54°W	SZ3286
Weston Mill	Devon	50.39°N 04.18°W	SX4557
Weston-on-Avon	Warwickshire	52.15°N 01.78°W	SP1551
Weston-on-the-Green	Oxfordshire	51.85°N 01.23°W	SP5318
Weston-on-Trent	Derbyshire	52.84°N 01.40°W	SK4028
Weston Park	Bath and North East Somerset	51.39°N 02.38°W	ST7366
Weston Patrick	Hampshire	51.20°N 01.01°W	SU6946
Weston Point	Cheshire	53.32°N 02.76°W	SJ4981
Weston Rhyn	Shropshire	52.90°N 03.07°W	SJ2835
Weston-sub-Edge	Gloucestershire	52.06°N 01.82°W	SP1241
Weston-super-Mare	North Somerset	51.34°N 02.97°W	ST3261
Weston Town	Somerset	51.16°N 02.43°W	ST7041
Weston Turville	Buckinghamshire	51.78°N 00.76°W	SP8510
Weston-under-Lizard	Staffordshire	52.68°N 02.29°W	SJ8010
Weston under Penyard	Herefordshire	51.90°N 02.55°W	SO6223
Weston under Wetherley	Warwickshire	52.31°N 01.47°W	SP3669
Weston Underwood	Derbyshire	52.97°N 01.56°W	SK2942
Weston Underwood	Milton Keynes	52.14°N 00.74°W	SP8650
Westonwharf	Shropshire	52.81°N 02.86°W	SJ4225
Westonzoyland	Somerset	51.10°N 02.92°W	ST3534
West Orchard	Dorset	50.94°N 02.25°W	ST8216
West Overton	Wiltshire	51.40°N 01.81°W	SU1367
Westow	North Yorkshire	54.07°N 00.85°W	SE7565
Westowe	Somerset	51.08°N 03.25°W	ST1232
Westown	Devon	50.90°N 03.26°W	ST1113
Westown	Perth and Kinross	56.42°N 03.21°W	NO2527

=== West P – West Q ===
Location	Locality	Coordinates (links to map & photo sources)	OS grid reference
West Panson	Devon	50.69°N 04.35°W	SX3491
West Park	Hartlepool	54.68°N 01.25°W	NZ4832
West Park	City of Kingston upon Hull	53.73°N 00.37°W	TA0728
West Park	Leeds	53.82°N 01.60°W	SE2637
West Park	South Tyneside	54.97°N 01.43°W	NZ3665
West Park	St Helens	53.44°N 02.76°W	SJ4995
West Parley	Dorset	50.77°N 01.88°W	SZ0897
West Pasture	Durham	54.59°N 02.09°W	NY9422
West Peckham	Kent	51.24°N 00.34°E	TQ6452
West Pelton	Durham	54.87°N 01.64°W	NZ2353
West Pennard	Somerset	51.13°N 02.65°W	ST5438
West Pentire	Cornwall	50.39°N 05.13°W	SW7760
West Perry	Cambridgeshire	52.28°N 00.33°W	TL1466
West Pontnewydd	Torfaen	51.65°N 03.04°W	ST2896
West Poringland	Norfolk	52.55°N 01.33°E	TG2600
West Porlock	Somerset	51.21°N 03.61°W	SS8747
Westport	Somerset	50.96°N 02.88°W	ST3819
West Porton	Renfrewshire	55.90°N 04.51°W	NS4371
West Pulham	Dorset	50.87°N 02.42°W	ST7008
West Putford	Devon	50.91°N 04.34°W	SS3515
West Quantoxhead	Somerset	51.16°N 03.27°W	ST1141
Westquarter	Falkirk	55.98°N 03.74°W	NS9178

=== West R ===
Location	Locality	Coordinates (links to map & photo sources)	OS grid reference
Westra	The Vale Of Glamorgan	51.43°N 03.23°W	ST1471
West Rainton	Durham	54.80°N 01.50°W	NZ3246
West Rasen	Lincolnshire	53.38°N 00.40°W	TF0689
West Ravendale	North East Lincolnshire	53.47°N 00.16°W	TF2299
Westray	Orkney Islands	59.30°N 02.99°W	HY437466
West Raynham	Norfolk	52.79°N 00.77°E	TF8725
West Retford	Nottinghamshire	53.32°N 00.96°W	SK6981
Westridge Green	Berkshire	51.50°N 01.19°W	SU5679
Westrigg	West Lothian	55.88°N 03.76°W	NS9067
Westrip	Gloucestershire	51.74°N 02.26°W	SO8205
Westrop	Wiltshire	51.42°N 02.17°W	ST8870
Westrop Green	Berkshire	51.43°N 01.25°W	SU5271
West Rounton	North Yorkshire	54.42°N 01.36°W	NZ4103
West Row	Suffolk	52.34°N 00.45°E	TL6775
West Royd	Bradford	53.82°N 01.75°W	SE1637
West Rudham	Norfolk	52.81°N 00.68°E	TF8127
West Ruislip	Hillingdon	51.56°N 00.44°W	TQ0886
Westrum	Lincolnshire	53.54°N 00.49°W	TA0006
West Runton	Norfolk	52.93°N 01.24°E	TG1842
Westruther	Scottish Borders	55.74°N 02.59°W	NT6350
Westry	Cambridgeshire	52.56°N 00.04°E	TL3998

=== West S ===
Location	Locality	Coordinates (links to map & photo sources)	OS grid reference
West Saltoun	East Lothian	55.89°N 02.86°W	NT4667
West Sandford	Devon	50.80°N 03.69°W	SS8102
West Sandwick	Shetland Islands	60.57°N 01.19°W	HU4488
West Scholes	Bradford	53.77°N 01.86°W	SE0931
West Scrafton	North Yorkshire	54.24°N 01.89°W	SE0783
West Shepton	Somerset	51.18°N 02.55°W	ST6143
West Side	Blaenau Gwent	51.75°N 03.17°W	SO1907
Westside	Aberdeenshire	57.05°N 02.24°W	NO8596
Westside	Orkney Islands	59.17°N 02.82°W	HY5332
West Skelston	Dumfries and Galloway	55.14°N 03.85°W	NX8285
West Sleekburn	Northumberland	55.15°N 01.56°W	NZ2885
West Somerton	Norfolk	52.71°N 01.64°E	TG4619
West Southbourne	Bournemouth	50.72°N 01.81°W	SZ1392
West Stafford	Dorset	50.70°N 02.39°W	SY7289
West Stockwith	Nottinghamshire	53.44°N 00.81°W	SK7995
West Stoke	Somerset	50.95°N 02.75°W	ST4717
West Stoke	West Sussex	50.86°N 00.83°W	SU8208
West Stonesdale	North Yorkshire	54.41°N 02.18°W	NY8802
West Stoughton	Somerset	51.23°N 02.84°W	ST4149
West Stour	Dorset	50.99°N 02.31°W	ST7822
West Stourmouth	Kent	51.31°N 01.22°E	TR2562
West Stow	Suffolk	52.29°N 00.65°E	TL8170
West Stowell	Wiltshire	51.35°N 01.81°W	SU1362
West Strathan	Highland	58.53°N 04.47°W	NC5663
West Stratton	Hampshire	51.15°N 01.25°W	SU5240
West Street (Cliffe and Cliffe Woods)	Kent	51.45°N 00.48°E	TQ7376
West Street (Lenham)	Kent	51.25°N 00.72°E	TQ9054
West Street (Northbourne)	Kent	51.23°N 01.32°E	TR3254
West Street	Suffolk	52.29°N 00.90°E	TL9870

=== West T ===
Location	Locality	Coordinates (links to map & photo sources)	OS grid reference
West Tanfield	North Yorkshire	54.19°N 01.60°W	SE2678
West Taphouse	Cornwall	50.43°N 04.60°W	SX1563
West Tarbert	Argyll and Bute	55.84°N 05.45°W	NR8467
West Tarring	West Sussex	50.81°N 00.39°W	TQ1303
West Third	Scottish Borders	55.61°N 02.57°W	NT6436
West Thirston	Northumberland	55.29°N 01.71°W	NU1800
West Thorney	West Sussex	50.81°N 00.92°W	SU7602
Westthorpe	Derbyshire	53.30°N 01.32°W	SK4579
West Thurrock	Essex	51.47°N 00.27°E	TQ5878
West Tilbury	Essex	51.47°N 00.38°E	TQ6678
West Tisted	Hampshire	51.05°N 01.07°W	SU6529
West Tofts	Norfolk	52.49°N 00.69°E	TL8392
West Tolgus	Cornwall	50.23°N 05.26°W	SW6742
West Torrington	Lincolnshire	53.32°N 00.30°W	TF1382
West Town (Nempnett Thrubwell)	Bath and North East Somerset	51.33°N 02.70°W	ST5160
West Town (Newton St Cyres)	Devon	50.76°N 03.60°W	SX8797
West Town (Woolfardisworthy)	Devon	50.96°N 04.39°W	SS3221
West Town	Hampshire	50.78°N 00.99°W	SZ7199
West Town	Herefordshire	52.24°N 02.82°W	SO4461
West Town (Backwell)	North Somerset	51.40°N 02.74°W	ST4868
West Town (Baltonsborough)	Somerset	51.11°N 02.67°W	ST5335
West Town	West Sussex	50.92°N 00.19°W	TQ2716
West Tytherley	Hampshire	51.05°N 01.61°W	SU2729

=== West V ===
Location	Locality	Coordinates (links to map & photo sources)	OS grid reference
West Vale	Calderdale	53.68°N 01.86°W	SE0921
Westvale	Knowsley	53.47°N 02.90°W	SJ4098
West View	Hartlepool	54.70°N 01.25°W	NZ4835
West Village	The Vale Of Glamorgan	51.45°N 03.45°W	SS9974
Westville	Devon	50.28°N 03.78°W	SX7344
Westville	Nottinghamshire	53.01°N 01.24°W	SK5147

=== West W ===
Location	Locality	Coordinates (links to map & photo sources)	OS grid reference
West Walton	Norfolk	52.69°N 00.17°E	TF4713
Westward	Cumbria	54.78°N 03.13°W	NY2744
Westward Ho!	Devon	51.03°N 04.24°W	SS4329
West Watergate	Cornwall	50.34°N 04.51°W	SX2153
West Watford	Hertfordshire	51.64°N 00.41°W	TQ1095
Westweekmoor	Devon	50.71°N 04.26°W	SX4093
Westwell	Kent	51.18°N 00.83°E	TQ9847
Westwell	Oxfordshire	51.78°N 01.68°W	SP2210
Westwell Leacon	Kent	51.18°N 00.80°E	TQ9647
West Wellow	Hampshire	50.96°N 01.58°W	SU2919
Westwells	Wiltshire	51.41°N 02.21°W	ST8568
West Wembury	Devon	50.32°N 04.08°W	SX5249
West Wemyss	Fife	56.13°N 03.09°W	NT3294
West Whitefield	Perth and Kinross	56.49°N 03.36°W	NO1634
Westwick	Cambridgeshire	52.26°N 00.07°E	TL4265
Westwick	Durham	54.53°N 01.89°W	NZ0715
Westwick	Norfolk	52.78°N 01.36°E	TG2726
West Wick	North Somerset	51.34°N 02.92°W	ST3661
West Wickham	Bromley	51.36°N 00.01°W	TQ3865
West Wickham	Cambridgeshire	52.11°N 00.35°E	TL6149
Westwick Row	Hertfordshire	51.74°N 00.42°W	TL0906
West Williamston	Pembrokeshire	51.70°N 04.85°W	SN0305
West Willoughby	Lincolnshire	52.97°N 00.57°W	SK9643
West Winch	Norfolk	52.70°N 00.39°E	TF6215
West Winterslow	Wiltshire	51.08°N 01.67°W	SU2332
West Wittering	West Sussex	50.77°N 00.90°W	SZ7798
West Witton	North Yorkshire	54.28°N 01.90°W	SE0688
Westwood	Cambridgeshire	52.57°N 00.28°W	TL1699
Westwood (Broad Clyst)	Devon	50.77°N 03.40°W	SY0198
Westwood (Cockwood)	Devon	50.61°N 03.47°W	SX9680
Westwood (Canterbury)	Kent	51.19°N 01.10°E	TR1749
Westwood (Thanet)	Kent	51.36°N 01.38°E	TR3668
Westwood	Nottinghamshire	53.05°N 01.33°W	SK4551
Westwood	South Lanarkshire	55.75°N 04.20°W	NS6253
Westwood (Bemerton)	Wiltshire	51.07°N 01.84°W	SU1131
Westwood (near Bradford-on-Avon)	Wiltshire	51.32°N 02.28°W	ST8059
West Woodburn	Northumberland	55.16°N 02.17°W	NY8986
West Woodhay	Berkshire	51.36°N 01.44°W	SU3963
Westwood Heath	Warwickshire	52.38°N 01.59°W	SP2876
West Woodlands	Somerset	51.18°N 02.33°W	ST7743
Westwood Park	Essex	51.93°N 00.84°E	TL9630
Westwood Park	Salford	53.48°N 02.37°W	SJ7599
Westwoodside	North Lincolnshire	53.48°N 00.88°W	SK7499
West Worldham	Hampshire	51.11°N 00.94°W	SU7436
West Worlington	Devon	50.90°N 03.76°W	SS7613
West Worthing	West Sussex	50.80°N 00.39°W	TQ1302
West Wratting	Cambridgeshire	52.13°N 00.33°E	TL6051
West Wycombe	Buckinghamshire	51.63°N 00.81°W	SU8294
West Wylam	Northumberland	54.96°N 01.84°W	NZ1063

=== West Y ===
Location	Locality	Coordinates (links to map & photo sources)	OS grid reference
Westy	Cheshire	53.37°N 02.57°W	SJ6287
West Yatton	Wiltshire	51.46°N 02.21°W	ST8574
West Yell	Shetland Islands	60.52°N 01.18°W	HU4582
West Yeo	Somerset	51.06°N 02.95°W	ST3330
West Yoke	Kent	51.36°N 00.28°E	TQ5965
West Youlstone	Cornwall	50.90°N 04.47°W	SS2615

== Wet – Wez ==
Location	Locality	Coordinates (links to map & photo sources)	OS grid reference
Wetham Green	Kent	51.38°N 00.64°E	TQ8468
Wetheral	Cumbria	54.87°N 02.84°W	NY4654
Wetheral Plain	Cumbria	54.88°N 02.84°W	NY4655
Wetherby	Leeds	53.92°N 01.39°W	SE4048
Wetherden	Suffolk	52.22°N 00.92°E	TM0062
Wetherden Upper Town	Suffolk	52.24°N 00.94°E	TM0165
Wether Holm	Shetland Islands	60.42°N 01.15°W	HU466719
Wetheringsett	Suffolk	52.25°N 01.10°E	TM1266
Wethersfield	Essex	51.95°N 00.48°E	TL7131
Wethersta	Shetland Islands	60.36°N 01.34°W	HU3665
Wetherup Street	Suffolk	52.23°N 01.11°E	TM1364
Wetley Rocks	Staffordshire	53.03°N 02.06°W	SJ9649
Wetmore	Staffordshire	52.81°N 01.63°W	SK2524
Wettenhall	Cheshire	53.14°N 02.56°W	SJ6261
Wettenhall Green	Cheshire	53.13°N 02.56°W	SJ6260
Wettles	Shropshire	52.46°N 02.84°W	SO4386
Wetton	Staffordshire	53.09°N 01.85°W	SK1055
Wetwang	East Riding of Yorkshire	54.01°N 00.58°W	SE9359
Wetwood	Staffordshire	52.89°N 02.34°W	SJ7733
Wexcombe	Wiltshire	51.32°N 01.61°W	SU2759
Wexham Street	Buckinghamshire	51.53°N 00.57°W	SU9983
Weybourne	Norfolk	52.93°N 01.13°E	TG1142
Weybourne	Surrey	51.23°N 00.78°W	SU8549
Weybread	Suffolk	52.37°N 01.28°E	TM2480
Weybridge	Surrey	51.36°N 00.44°W	TQ0864
Weycroft	Devon	50.78°N 02.99°W	SY3099
Weyhill	Hampshire	51.21°N 01.55°W	SU3146
Weymouth	Dorset	50.60°N 02.46°W	SY6779
Weythel	Powys	52.20°N 03.12°W	SO2357
