= Barton Stacey =

Village and parish in Hampshire, England

Coordinates: 51.166667°N 1.366667°W

- Location within Hampshire
- Population: 892 (2001 Census); 948 (2011 Census including Bransbury and Newton Stacey)
- OS grid reference: SU435415
- District: Test Valley
- Shire county: Hampshire
- Region: South East
- Country: England
- Sovereign state: United Kingdom
- Post town: Winchester
- Postcode district: SO21
- Dialling code: 01962, 01264
- Police: Hampshire and Isle of Wight
- Fire: Hampshire and Isle of Wight
- Ambulance: South Central
- UK Parliament: Romsey and Southampton North

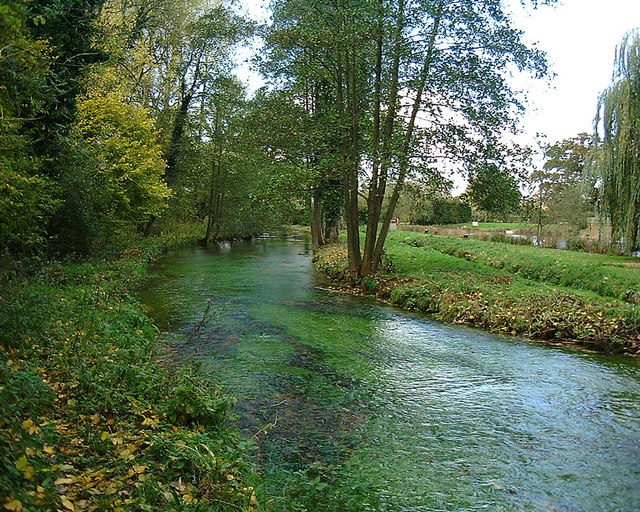
The River Dever, a chalk stream, at Barton Stacey

Barton Stacey is a village and undulating civil parish, which includes the hamlets of Bransbury, Newton Stacey, Drayton and Cocum, in the Test Valley district of Hampshire, England, centred about 7 miles (11 km) south-east of Andover. It is bounded to the north by the estate of Drayton Lodge (north of the A303 trunk road), and, to the south, by the minor A30 road; both being east–west routes, and connected by The Street/Cocum Road, the main road that bisects the village. The distance between the A303 and A30 at this point is 2 miles (3.2 km), which is twice the width of the parish.

The area is well-connected by roads. Bullington, to the east has the A34 road, joining Southampton and the south-central coast from near the close of the M3 to Oxford and The Midlands. Barton Stacey parish has the westernmost end of the A272 road, which runs from the A30, through nearby Winchester and on to Cross In Hand, East Sussex.

At Newton Stacey and Bransbury Common in the west the parish adjoins the braided River Test; its tributary the Dever runs through the north of the parish; both are noted for their trout fisheries. The village was severely damaged by a significant fire in 1792, destroying many properties.

== Civil parish ==
The total area of the civil parish is 5,027 acres (20,340,000 m^{2}). At the time of the 2001 census, it had a population of 892 living in 341 households; the population of the parish in 2016 was estimated to be 1,034. The civil parish includes the village of Barton Stacey, and the hamlets of Bransbury, Newton Stacey, Cocum, and Drayton.

Cocum lies to the south, it includes a farm and buildings, and incorporates a military small-arms firing range, situated to the north of the A30 road.

South of the A303 at Drayton is Barton Stacey Services, a trunk road service area accessible by westbound traffic only. This area was formerly known as Drayton Filling Station, having been developed from a parcel of MOD land in 1959.

Bransbury is to the west of Drayton, accessible either by turning south off the A303 or via Barton Stacey. There is a former mill building here alongside the river. The hamlet of Newton Stacey lies west of Barton Stacey on the road to Chilbolton.

== Geography ==
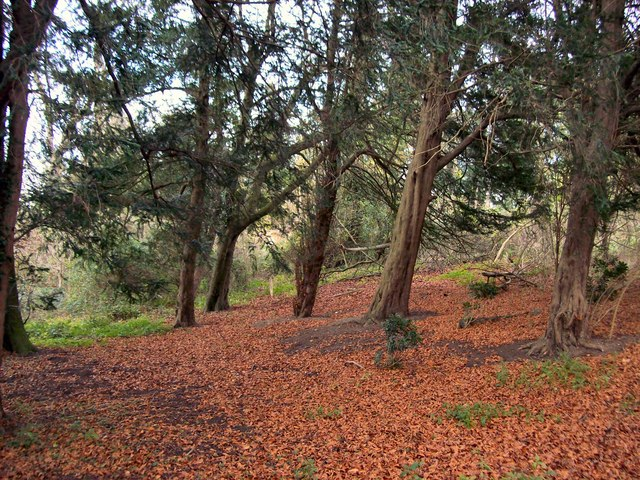
An autumnal Barton Wood

Barton Stacey lies in a corridor of land between the North Wessex Downs and the South Downs National Park. Its downland area is predominantly arable farmland, which has traditionally been used for growing malting barley, though other crops are grown, and sheep grazed.

The chalk streams of the Test and Dever are managed for sport fishing and the Dever also feeds a trout fishery just outside the village. The valley to the north of the village is characterised by pasture and woodland, whilst the local sections of the Dever and Test valleys are predominated by wet woodland and water meadows.

At either end of Roberts Road there are two pieces of woodland, both belonging to the MOD, past or through which run various public rights of way. Much of the remainder of the MOD land is rented to a local farmer.

Much of Barton Stacey lies within a Conservation Area. Some of its structures are listed or designated 'buildings of local interest'

The village itself lies in two parts: the original section comprises Kings Elms, Gravel Lane and The Street, situated around the church. Over the years, housing has been extended to the south but principally to the north-west.

Half the parish's homes are located around Roberts Road, East Road and West Road in housing built in the 1950s by the MOD as married quarters for troops posted to local army camps. From 1987 the MOD has sold many of these houses into private hands, retaining some in West Road for military personnel. Since then, only a few houses have been built in the parish, all privately constructed. In 2006/07 four flats were built on the edge of Roman Way. In 2018 five homes were constructed on a former commercial site next to the village store, with another five being built at the south end of the village. A plan exists to build some low-cost housing on land owned by the MOD. Ninety per cent of the residential properties in the village overlook open land.

In the south west of the parish there is a working oil well.

== Ecology ==
Local wildlife includes several protected species and includes the water vole, otter, roe deer, fallow deer, muntjac deer, badger, and pipistrelle and brown long-eared bats. The area is popular for brown trout fishing.

Birds include the lapwing, skylark, red kite, kestrel, yellowhammer, corn bunting, house martin, swift, swallow and barn owl.

== History ==
Three Neolithic long barrows have been found on Moody's Down which date from between 3,500 and 2,000 B.C., along with Bronze Age bowl barrows at Moody's Down and Newton Down Farm. All of them are designated Scheduled Monuments.

The Andyke at Bransbury is an Iron Age ditch and bank, and a remnant of a promontory fort, with some evidence of roundhouses.

A Roman road that once linked Winchester to Marlborough and Cirencester crosses the parish via Bransbury Common and signs of a Roman camp can be seen east of Manor Farm. Evidence of Romano-British inhabitants was discovered between Barton Stacey and Bransbury in 1977, in the form of a ‘plank burial' of a woman.

The first written record of Barton Stacey (Beretune), Newton Stacey and Bransbury is within the Anglo-Saxon Chronicles (855 A.D.) Beretune is thought to be Old English for ‘barley farm’. The Drove, an unpaved road leading east from the village towards Sutton Scotney, may be of Saxon origin.

The re-allocation of land in Drayton to New Minster is recorded in the Drayton Charter of 1019, a royal charter of King Cnut.

The hundred of Barton was granted by King John to Rogo de Sacy or Stacey in September 1199, and remained a possession of his son Emery who paid his knights fees for Bertune Sacy in 1206, and afterwards remained in the possession of the lords of the manor of Barton Stacey, once known as the Hundred of Barton Stacey.

The hundred court was held in Barton Stacey until the late 19th century when other governmental divisions assumed local jurisdiction.

=== 1792 fire ===
The ‘Great Fire of Barton Stacey’ in 1792 razed much of the village. The fire spread due to high winds and eventually destroyed 27 houses, 14 barns 10 stables and several granaries. At least one life was lost. Rebuilding works resulted in the present day character of the village, centred around The Street.

=== 19th century to present ===
The Barton Stacey Village Store was erected as a shop at about this time, and the original school buildings followed in Bullington Lane in 1886. There was some expansion of the village in the late 19th century and many of the present-day homes were added between 1939 and the 1980s.

In 1943 the War Department (now MOD) purchased 2106 acres (852.5 hectares) to the north, east and south of the village for £24,000 for use as a military training area. Four army camps were developed at Drayton: 'A', 'B' & 'C' Camps to the north of the A303, and 'D' Camp to the south, east of the road from the village to Longparish. All of the original buildings are long gone, though many of the roadways and hard-standings remain visible and these areas are now vacant. The last of the 'A' Camp huts was gifted to the parish in the 1970s when the MoD closed the barracks. It was relocated to the recreation ground where it was used as a sports pavilion until August 2020 when it was burnt down following a lightning strike.

== Religious buildings ==
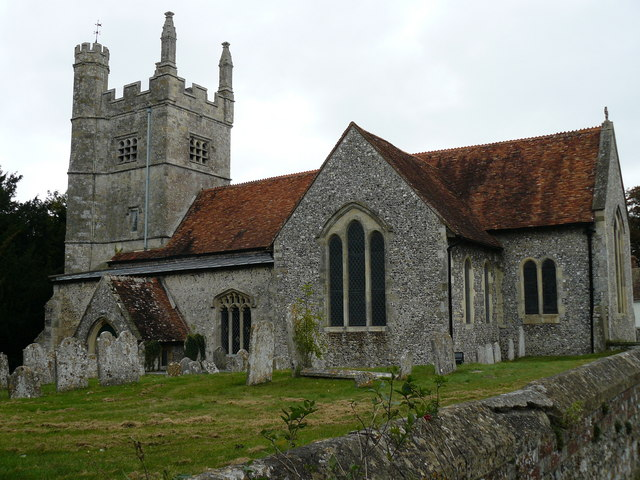
All Saints' Church, Barton Stacey

All Saints' Church is situated in the west of the village, at the junction of The Street and Bullington Lane. Built largely of flint, it is renowned as one of the oldest churches in England, and certainly the oldest building in Barton Stacey, dating in part from the 12th century; it is mentioned in the Domesday Book of 1086. Both the parish church and Church Farm House are grade II* listed.

The church was extended in the 1200s, 1400s and 1500s, and much of it was restored in 1877. It consists of an aisled nave with a west tower partly inserted into it, and a chancel with transeptal north and south chapels, and a porch to the south. The tower is early 16th century, of ashlar, with a polygonal southwest turret, and battlemented parapet with pinnacles.

== Education ==
A school, Barton Stacey C. of E. Primary, is located at the end of The Green. It has around 96 enrolled students.

Secondary school students in the village attend Testbourne Community School in the nearby village of Whitchurch, with a bus service running during school time.

Sixth Form students attend Peter Symonds College, in Winchester.

== Sport and Leisure ==
Activity clubs include a choir, judo club, football club, two drama clubs, Women's Institute, and a 'Tuesday Club'. Many activities are held in the village hall.

=== Recreation ground ===
The recreation ground is situated in the west of the village and contains two football pitches and a play park. A new pavilion is planned to be built in 2025. There are car parks in front of the village shop and in an adjacent road.

=== Sports clubs ===
Barton Stacey Football Club was established in 1919. The team plays and trains on the Barton Stacey recreation ground. The club currently fields four youth teams at Under 8, U9, U13 and U15, along with a senior side.

The Black Swans is the village netball team.

== Economy ==
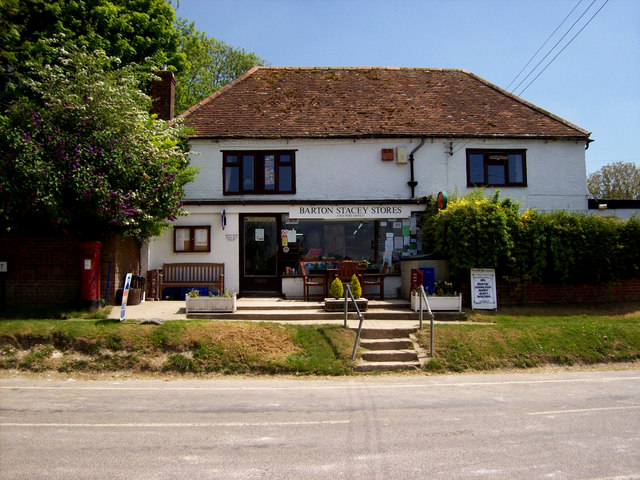
Barton Stacey Village Stores and Post Office has been trading for over 200 years and was doubled in size in 2022

A village store and post office is in the centre of the village, next to the village's one remaining pub, The Swan Inn. The shop has operated as a general store since around 1810, while The Swan dates to the late 18th century.

Dever Springs is a private trout fishery specialising in corporate fishing days. Specimen fish taken at Dever include a British record brown of 28 lbs 2 ozs. Lionel Hitchens Essential Oils Ltd is the largest employer in the village.

The trunk road service area 'Barton Stacey Services' comprises a Park Homes site of seven occupied units, a petrol filling station, a Starbucks, and motel, together with a vehicle repair business.

== Travel and transport ==
Barton Stacey enjoys good road links to Winchester, Andover, Basingstoke and Newbury thanks to its proximity to regionally important trunk roads.

Stagecoach operates the Cango C4 bus to Andover.

The nearest railway services run from Micheldever Station (5.5 miles), Whitchurch, Hampshire (7 miles) and Andover (8 miles). A Barton Stacey railway station operated briefly during World War II for military purposes.

== In popular culture ==
The village was mentioned in the song 'King of Road Safety' by London indie rock band The Bitter Springs from their 1997 album From the Parish of Arthritis.
