= River Dever =

River in Hampshire, England

Coordinates: 51.1585°N 1.2363°W

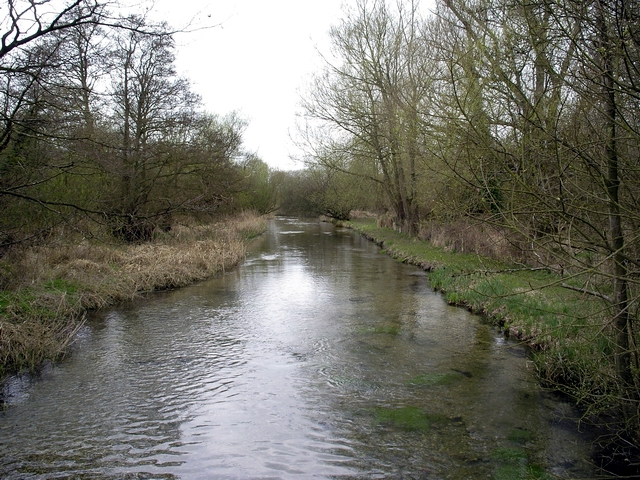
River Dever, Bransbury

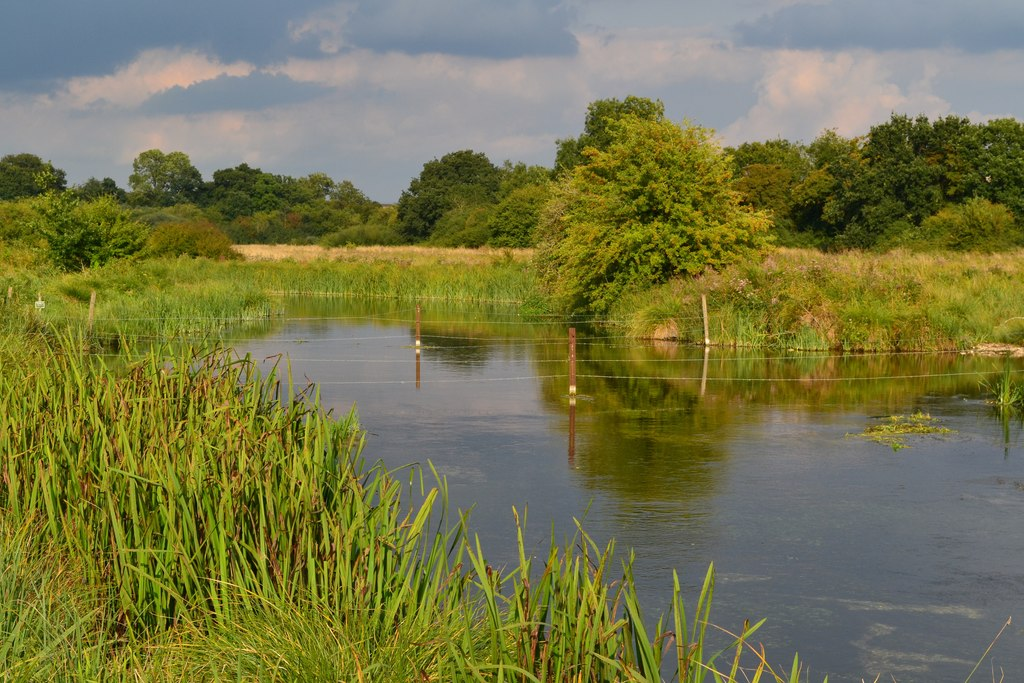
Newton Stacey ford, on the River Dever

The River Dever /ˈdiːvər/ is a chalk stream in Hampshire in the south of England. It rises at West Stratton near Micheldever and flows westwards for 11 mi (18 km) to meet the River Test at Wherwell.

== Course ==
The source is at 80 metres (260 ft) Above Ordnance Datum (AOD) alongside the A33, the main road north-east from Winchester, of Roman origin, (Note: Part of the road from Silchester to Winchester, Margary route 42A, at around grid reference SU535402) and meanders west through the village of Micheldever, three hamlets: Weston Colley, Stoke Charity and Wonston, then its largest village, Sutton Scotney, followed by Upper and Lower Bullington. The river skirts to the north of Barton Stacey and through the hamlet of Bransbury, meeting the Test on Bransbury Common, opposite the east fields of Wherwell on the multi-channel Test's West Bank at 48 metres (157 ft) AOD.

== Etymology ==
From Old English times some records have Myceldefer. The likely first sound-meaning denoted by the scribe is /mixl/, that means "great", and the latter part, if from the Common Brittonic, "water, river" as in Andover or the Candover Brook nearby.

Alternatively the Old Welsh /mixn/ for "bog" is suggested by the earliest-known form, from 862, Mycendefr, not relatively prevalent due to the gradient and alkaline water.

== Attributes ==
It is essentially fed by very close chalk aquifers, likewise to its continuation the Test, a highly abundant watercourse in Europe for large trout. It includes two trout farms, at the otherwise almost wholly green locality of Bransbury, and at Difford, north of Barton Stacey. The watermill at Weston Colley is a Grade II listed building/. The mill at Bransbury is also Grade II listed.

== Water quality ==
The Environment Agency measures the water quality of the river systems in England. Each is given an overall ecological status, which may be one of five levels: high, good, moderate, poor and bad. There are several components that are used to determine this, including biological status, which looks at the quantity and varieties of invertebrates, angiosperms and fish. Chemical status, which compares the concentrations of various chemicals against known safe concentrations, is rated good or fail.

Water quality of the River Dever in 2019:

Section	Ecological Status	Chemical Status	Overall Status	Length	Catchment	Channel
Dever	Good	Fail	Moderate	20.181 km (12.540 mi)	128.005 km^{2} (49.423 sq mi)	
