= Weston Colley =

Hamlet in Hampshire, England

Coordinates: 51.148091°N 1.291848°W

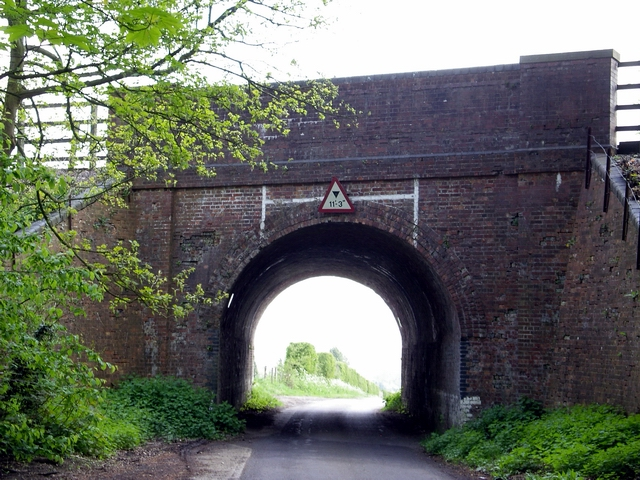
- Rail bridge over Weston Colley

- Location within Hampshire
- OS grid reference: SU4963038997
- Civil parish: Micheldever
- District: City of Winchester
- Shire county: Hampshire
- Region: South East
- Country: England
- Sovereign state: United Kingdom
- Post town: WINCHESTER
- Postcode district: SO21 3
- Dialling code: 01962
- Police: Hampshire and Isle of Wight
- Fire: Hampshire and Isle of Wight
- Ambulance: South Central
- UK Parliament: Winchester

Weston Colley is a hamlet of about twenty dwellings, adjacent to (and within the parish of) Micheldever, Winchester, Hampshire, England. It is within the City of Winchester local government ward of Wonston And Micheldever. Winchester is also the nearest large settlement, lying approximately 7 miles (11 km) south of the hamlet.

== History ==
Within the past thirty years, the landed estate which owned much of Weston Colley has sold (mostly to private owners) its housing portfolio, retaining most of the farmland within and around the hamlet, together with Weston Farm, which is run on a long tenancy. The landed estate is now owned by Zurich Financial Services, which acquired it as part of its buy-out of Eagle Star Insurance - which, in-turn, bought the assets from the estate of J. Arthur Rank - based at near-by Sutton Scotney.

The housing stock mainly dates from the 1930s but there are some centuries' old thatched, oak-timber buildings.

== Business & Services ==
Whilst there are no large commercial activities in Weston Colley, some residents operate enterprising small businesses. Examples are a lock-up yard, farm, horticultural service, photo-artist, a bed-and-breakfast and a small (maximum five caravans) certified field camping site. However, the hamlet has no shops, pubs nor places of worship.

ADSL broadband-internet is limited to about six GB because Micheldever's telephone exchange serves a small population (therefore is low priority to British Telecom) and because of the distance from that exchange. The quality of service is, however, good, with few drop-outs. Both the telephone / broadband wires and those that deliver electricity are located above ground on poles. There is mains water. However, there is no cable TV / fibre broadband, no mains gas nor mains sewage (residents have septic tanks in their gardens).

Nearby services include: churches in several villages, a village shop, petrol station and doctors' surgery in Sutton Scotney, a primary school in Micheldever and Micheldever railway station on the South West Main Line. More comprehensive services are available in Winchester (circa nine miles), Andover and Basingstoke (both circa fifteen miles)

At each end of the hamlet is a bridge. The Micheldever end has an elevated railway line over the single-track lane, restricting the height of traffic below. At the Stoke Charity end, the River Dever is crossed by a single-track road bridge, which was rebuilt in the 2000s to safely carry heavy grain lorries to and from the farm.

By the railway bridge is a mobile telephone transceiver, owned by EE. Some while ago, Vodafone applied to install another mast, close by. However, whereas the EE mast is camouflaged by trees, the proposed Vodafone mast was much taller and received considerable local opposition.

== Geography ==
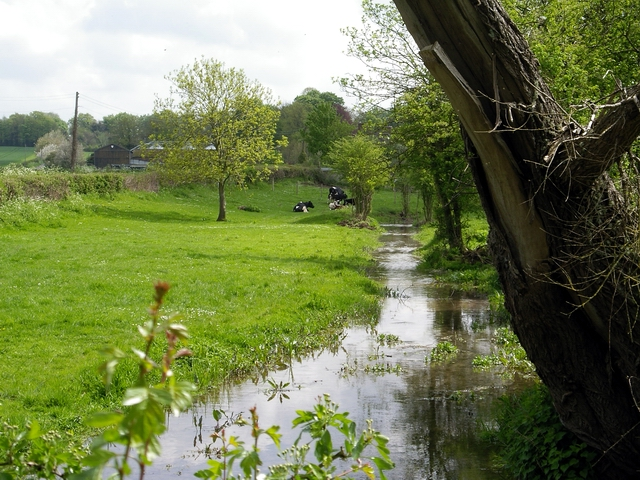
The River Dever at Weston Colley

Weston Colley is located entirely within the Dever Valley; the River Dever /ˈdiːvər/ flows through the hamlet but briefly disappears under the tall Victorian railway-track embankment which separates Weston Colley from Micheldever. The busy main London (Waterloo) to Southampton railway still uses the line. There is one proper through-road (Weston Lane) in the hamlet, from Northbrook (Micheldever) at one end and toward Stoke Charity at the other. There is also a green lane (unsuitable for most road transport) from Micheldever Station.

Weston Colley sits on southern English chalk downland. This means the valley sides rise gently and the River Dever runs very clear - though it dries in arid summers (chalk being porous). Bare soil is alkaline and populated by chunks of flint. Most of the non-garden area is arable fields with some woodland by the river. A few cows, nursing young cattle, are often to be seen in the water meadow but the dairy has not operated for decades.
