= Westvale =

Westvale may refer to:

- Westvale, Queensland, a locality in the Somerset Region, Queensland, Australia
- Westvale, Merseyside, a location in England
- Westvale, New York, a suburban community in Onondaga County, New York, United States
