= Newton Stacey =

Hamlet in Hampshire, England

Coordinates: 51°09′41″N 1°24′50″W

- Hamlet
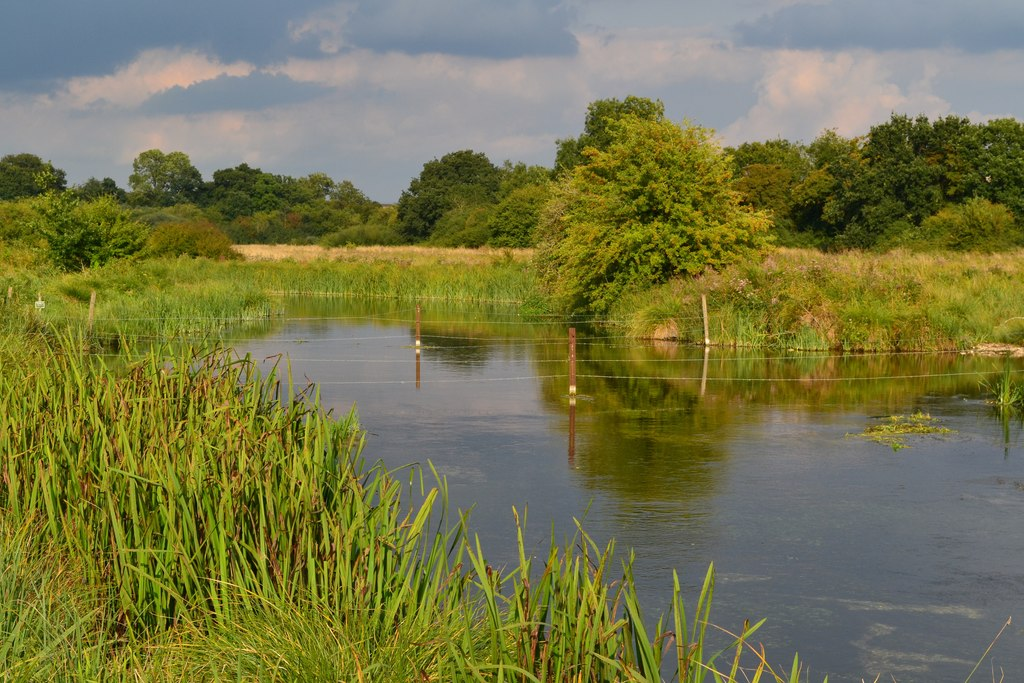
- Newton Stacey Ford, on the River Dever

- Location within Hampshire
- OS grid reference: SU4108940407
- District: Test Valley
- Shire county: Hampshire
- Region: South East
- Country: England
- Sovereign state: United Kingdom
- Post town: STOCKBRIDGE
- Postcode district: SO20
- Dialling code: 01264
- Police: Hampshire and Isle of Wight
- Fire: Hampshire and Isle of Wight
- Ambulance: South Central
- UK Parliament: Romsey and Southampton North

Newton Stacey is a hamlet in the Barton Stacey civil parish in the Test Valley district of Hampshire, England. Its nearest town is Stockbridge, which lies approximately 4.5 miles (7.3 km) south-west from the hamlet.

== History ==
Close to Newton Stacey is a grass-grown track, said to be a disused part of the Roman road from Winchester to Cirencester, which runs northwards past Bransbury Common. This road divides between Barton Stacey and Newton Stacey, and close to it are six tumuli, one of which is long.

Newton Stacey was named Niwetone in the ancient hundred of Bertun (i.e. the hundred of Barton), in the Domesday Book in 1086.

The hundred of Barton was granted by King John to Rogo de Sacy or Stacey in September 1199, remained a possession of his son Emery who paid his knights fees for Bertune Sacy in 1206, and afterwards remained in the possession of the lords of the manor of Barton Stacey, hence referred to as the hundred of Barton Stacey. In the same decades, the hamlet of Newton began to be called Newton Stacey.

The hundred court was held in Barton Stacey until the late 19th century when other governmental divisions assumed local jurisdiction.

In 1614 the Puritan, Revd Stephen Bachiler, moved from nearby Wherwell to Newton Stacey where he lived until shortly before setting sail for America. Bachiler founded the town of Hampton in present-day New Hampshire. A number of Newton Stacey residents, influenced by Bachiler's zealous preaching, settled in the new world.

Since 1 April 1974 the hamlet of Newton Stacey has been within the shire district of Test Valley, due to a merger of the boroughs of Andover and Romsey, along with Andover Rural District and Romsey and Stockbridge Rural District.

The twentieth century's technological advances led to increasing population mobility, road development and development in the larger cities, so Newton Stacey stayed relatively small yet the population has an increased standard of living.

In October 2012 a man and his two children were found dead in a car at a lane within the locality.
