= Blissfields =

Music festival in Hampshire, England

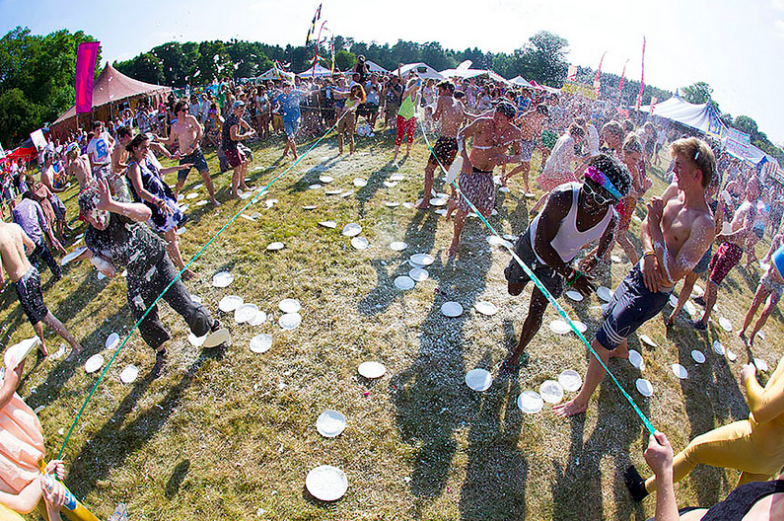
An official press photo of Blissfields Festival 2013 showing people at the event engaged in a pie fight game.

Blissfields was an annual music festival in Hampshire, England founded by Paul and Mel Bliss in 2001 at Bradley Farm, Bradley, near Alresford. In 2011 the festival moved to a new site in Vicarage Farm, Woodmancott near Winchester. The festival is currently 2,500 ticket capacity and has previously seen appearances from Mumford and Sons, Bastille, Laura Marling, Super Furry Animals, Tricky, Dizzee Rascal, Years & Years, and Wolf Alice.

It was a winner of the "Best Small Festival" award at the 2007 UK Festival Awards, and a winner of the "Most Unique Arena" Award at the 2015 Association Of Independent Festivals (AIF) Congress.

The festival was primarily pop, folk, indie, rock, and dance orientated and is attended by families as well as younger music fans.

It was announced in 2018 that Blissfields would take a year off, however it did not return, with 2017 being the final instalment of the festival.

== History ==
The first Blissfields event was in 2001 when Paul and Mel Bliss invited a few bands to play at Bradley Farm, near Alresford. Starting with just approximately 70 attendees, Blissfields was held again in subsequent years, slowly increasing in size. In 2005, with increased health and safety concerns and licence demands, there was a charge to camp.

== 2007 ==
In 2007, the festival won the "Best Small Festival" award at the UK Festival Awards.

Scouting for Girls headlined and a second stage called the Stage Bus was added. Restrictions at Bradley Farm meant that no more than 1,000 people could attend.

== 2008 ==
Blissfields was to move to the Matterley Bowl near Winchester in 2008, resulting in an increase in the capacity of the festival to 4,000. On 2 June it was announced that the festival would be cancelled. There were going to be four stages, with The Wonder Stuff, The Whip and Roni Size/Reprazent headlining the Punch Bowl, the open air main stage, between 4 and 6 July.

== 2009 ==
In 2009, the festival moved back to its original home in Bradley. Headliners were Super Furry Animals, Laura Marling and Mumford and Sons with Ben Howard also performing.

Mumford and Sons performed as then backing band to Laura Marling for the last time following years of performing live together. The ticket capacity that year was 1,250.

== 2010 ==
The event celebrated its 10th birthday. as Stereo MC's were the main headliners, whilst other acts playing that year included Band of Skulls, Ou Est Le Swimming Pool, Dub Pistols, James Yuill, and Kill It Kid.

It was attended by 1,500 ticket buyers.

== 2011 ==
The festival moved to a new site with a larger capacity at Vicarage Farm, Woodmancott near Winchester. It was attended by 1,800 ticket buyers.

Main acts included Frank Turner, Tricky, Bastille and Subgiant (band). Along with the Shakey Ape Comedy Stage featuring Stevie Gray, Larry Dean and Freddy Quinne.

== 2012 ==
This year's main acts were Noisettes and Patrick Wolf as well as Jake Bugg, Bastille, King Charles and Guillemots. A week before the festival it was announced that Charlotte Church would also join the line-up as a surprise mid-afternoon guest on the second stage previewing new material.

The event was attended by 2,000 ticket buyers.

The festival appeared at part of Summer Daze, a television program made for the Channel 4 network, being shown on E4, 4Music and Channel 4 itself during its T4 programming. It was also listed in The Sunday Times "top 50 music festivals" for that year.

== 2013 ==
The 2013 festival was held between 5 and 7 July. Headline acts included Mystery Jets and Bastille returning after the previous year, as well as Fenech-Soler (whom played at the 2011 festival), Mike Skinner performing with Rob Harvey as The D.O.T., Theme Park, and Marika Hackman.

The event was attended by 2,500 ticket buyers, with a total capacity of 4,000 people, and was listed by The Guardian as a "top 50 boutique music festival", and The Telegraph in their "top 100 festivals" for that year.

== 2014 ==
The theme in 2014 was "Walk On The Wild Side" with many attendees wearing animal print during the weekend. The event also partnered with Born Free Foundation, with founder Virginia McKenna giving a speech at the event on the main stage.

Live acts included 2manydjs the live side project of producers Soulwax, Sleigh Bells, Wolf Alice, Snakehips, tUne-yArDs, Years & Years, Laurel, Dub Pistols, Hercules And Love Affair, Spector, Bipolar Sunshine, Chloe Howl, Dan Croll, Luke Sital-Singh, Nick Mulvey, Gentleman's Dub Club, Melt Yourself Down, Monki, Gypsy Disco, Ry X, Famy, Subgiant, Cosmo Sheldrake, Flyte, Gypsy Disco, TCTS, Chris T-T, Electric Swing Circus, Beans on Toast, Kyan, Johnny Flynn, Kidnap Kid, and Thumpers.

The event was included in The Guardian, Telegraph, The Mirror, Big Issue, Notion and NME's festival print coverage.

== 2015 ==
The 2015 theme was "Somewhere In Time".

The festival line-up included The Horrors, Simian Mobile Disco, John Grant, Glass Animals, Public Service Broadcasting, Grandmaster Flash, Ibibio Sound Machine, Songhoy Blues, Mele, The Correspondents, Novelist, Ghostpoet, DJ Yoda, Akala, Rhodes, Beans on Toast, Madam X, Tambour Battant, Missill, Cosmo Sheldrake, Gengahr, Loyle Carner, Kiko Bun, We Have Band, Dub Pistols, Alex Adair, Eton Messy DJs, Subgiant, The Mispers, Flo Morrissey, Palace, Spring King.

The Angel Gardens family area, in 2015 given a political angle with workshops on how to form protests, was ranked second on The Guardian's "Summer Checklist" article, below seeing Kanye West at Glastonbury.

The Hidden Hedge area of Blissfields won the "Most Unique Arena" award at the 2015 Association Of Independent Festivals Congress and Awards.

== 2016 ==
The 2016 theme was "House Party". Under the theme, the festival built a two-story open-fronted house in the centre of the festival.

The festival line-up included Dizzee Rascal, Everything Everything, Swim Deep, Honne, Melt Yourself Down, Norman Jay, Roni Size, Sundara Karma, Dub Pistols, Beans on Toast, Shy FX, Loyle Carner, Drones Club, Blaenavon, Frances, Billie Marten, Rationale, Spring King, Barely Legal, Isaac Gracie, Mary Miss Fairy, Mini Da Minx, and Molotov Jukebox.

Blissfields was included in MTV's "Best Of The Fests" coverage, was ranked second on The Guardian's list of "Bang For Your Buck" where the ticket price was divided by the quantity of live acts and on-site activities, also featuring in the newspaper's "Top 10 Family Festivals" list, The Independent's "Top 20 Boutique Festivals", Radio Times "Top 10 Festivals", and was included in The Standard's "Top 5 Essential Festivals".

== 2017 ==
It was announced in December 2016 that the theme for 2017 would be "The Bizarre", using imagery and wording from popular culture including Stranger Things and Twin Peaks.

In an announcement video in January 2017, it was revealed that Metronomy would be headlining the Saturday night, later confirming The Cinematic Orchestra and DJ Yoda performing his Stranger Things mixtape would be the Friday and Thursday nights. Other acts due to perform include Sundara Karma, Lady Leshurr, Delta Heavy, The Japanese House, Tom Grennan, Pumerosa, DJ Luck & MC Neat, and Bonzai.

The festival took place on 6-8 July at the Vicarage Farm site in Hampshire.
