= Hunton, Hampshire =

Village in Hampshire, England

Coordinates: 51.1544°N 1.3121°W

Hunton
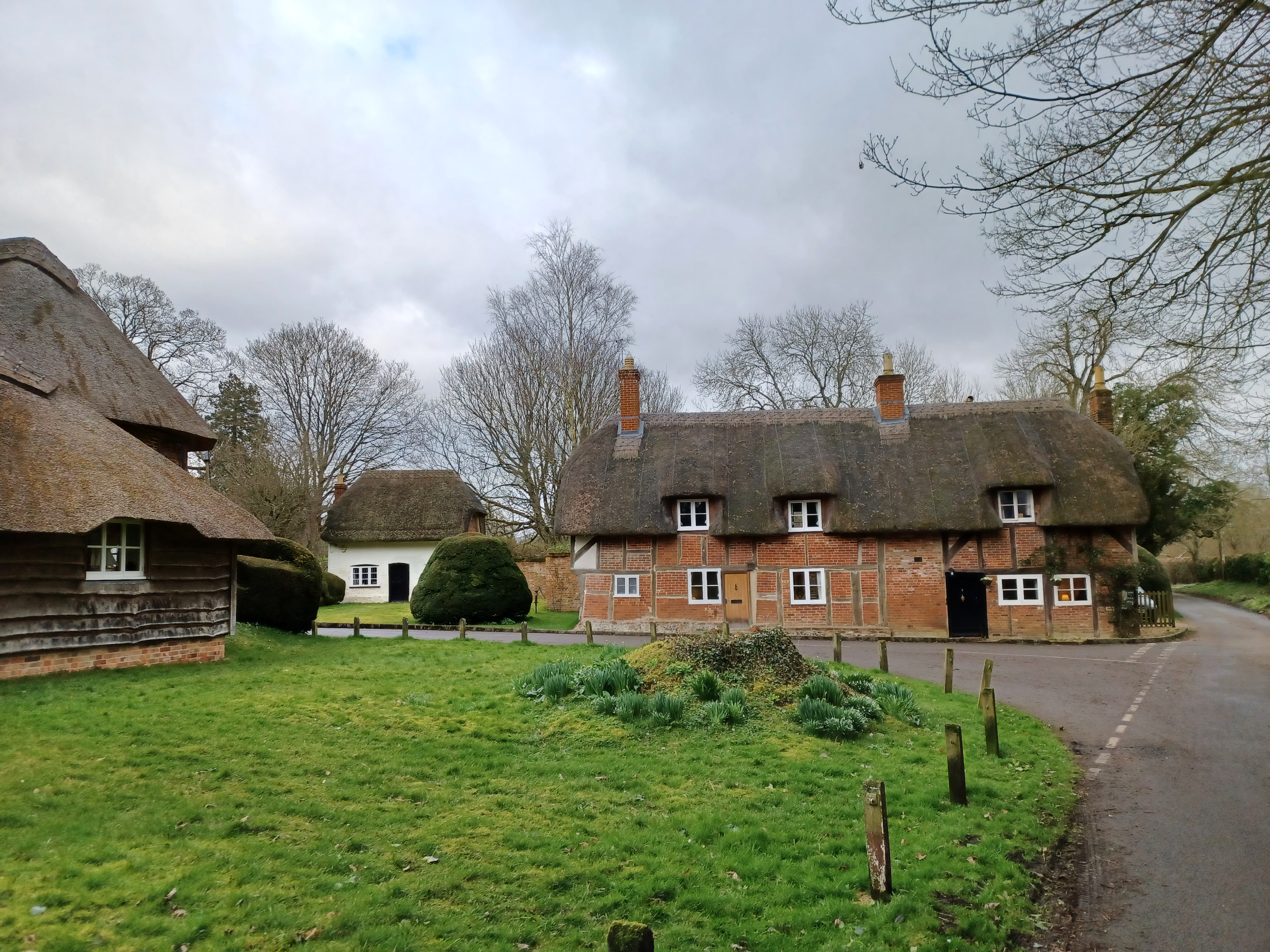
- Hunton Down Lane

- Location within Hampshire
- Civil parish: Wonston
- District: Winchester
- Shire county: Hampshire
- Region: South East
- Country: England
- Sovereign state: United Kingdom

Hunton is a village and former civil parish, now in the parish of Wonston, in the Winchester district, in the county of Hampshire, England. It is about 6 miles (10 km) miles from the city of Winchester. In 1931 the parish had a population of 94. Hunton has a church called St James' Church which is grade II listed.

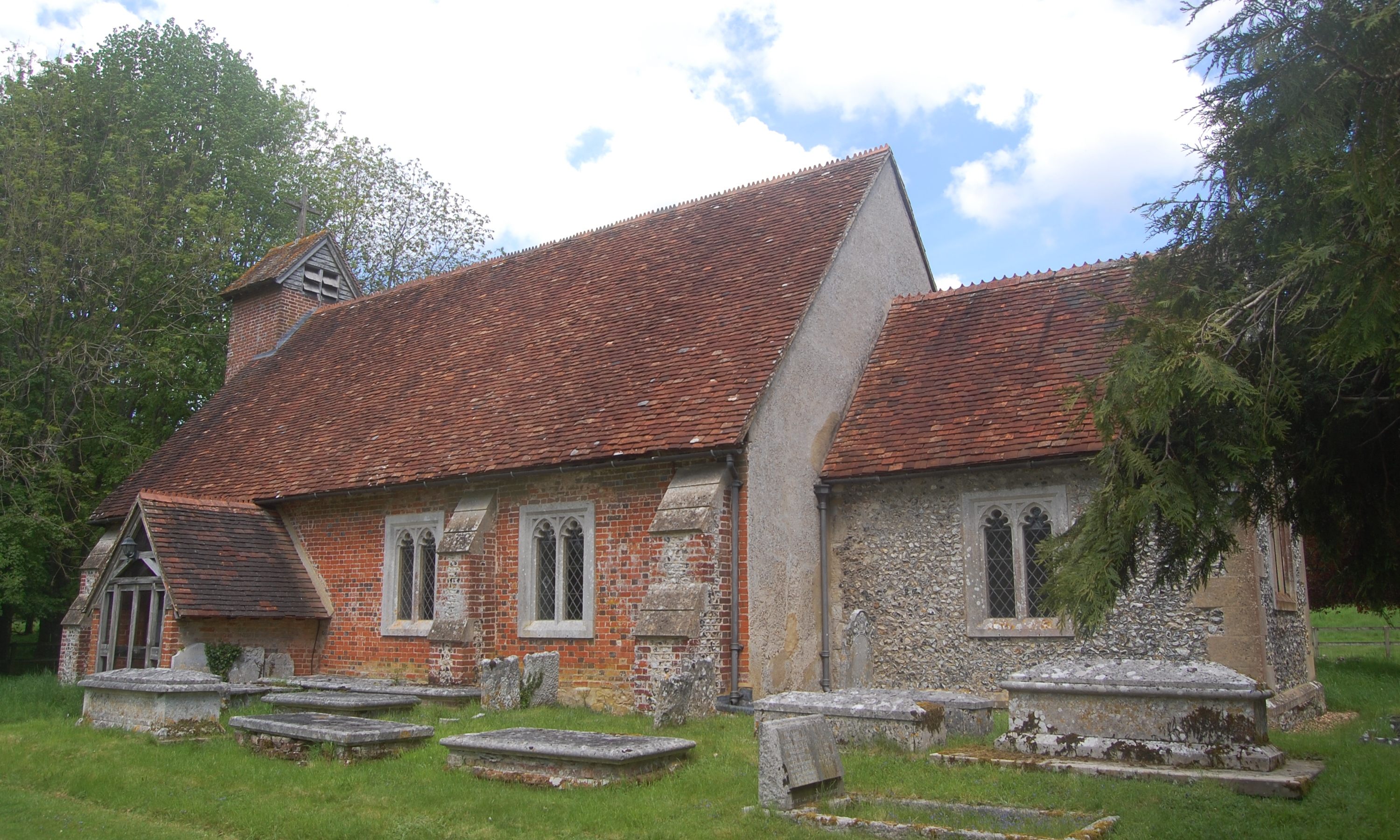
Hunton church

== History ==
The name "Hunton" means 'Dog farm/settlement'. Hunton was formerly a chapelry in the parish of Crawley, from 1866 Hunton was a civil parish in its own right, on 1 April 1932 the parish was abolished and merged with Wonston.
