= Woodmancott =

Village and parish in Hampshire, England

Coordinates: 51.1789°N 1.1950°W

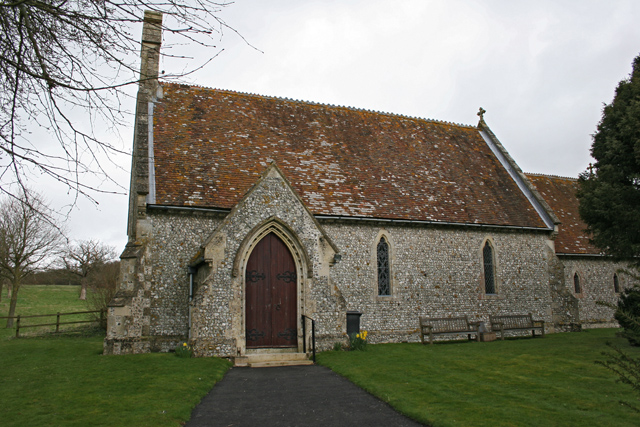
- Church of St. James, Woodmancott

- Location within Hampshire
- OS grid reference: SU5637042490
- Civil parish: Micheldever
- District: Winchester
- Shire county: Hampshire
- Region: South East
- Country: England
- Sovereign state: United Kingdom
- Post town: WINCHESTER
- Postcode district: SO21
- Dialling code: 01962
- Police: Hampshire and Isle of Wight
- Fire: Hampshire and Isle of Wight
- Ambulance: South Central
- UK Parliament: Winchester

Woodmancott is a village and former civil parish, now in the parish of Micheldever, in the Winchester district of Hampshire, England. Its nearest town is Winchester, which lies approximately 9.3 miles (15.0 km) south-west from the hamlet, just of the M3. The village is notable for Blissfields Festival, hosted each summer at Vicarage Farm since 2011. In 1961 the parish had a population of 31. On 1 April 1985 the parish was abolished and merged with Micheldever and Candovers.
