= Weston Patrick =

Village and parish in Hampshire, England

Coordinates: 51.217707°N 1.013591°W

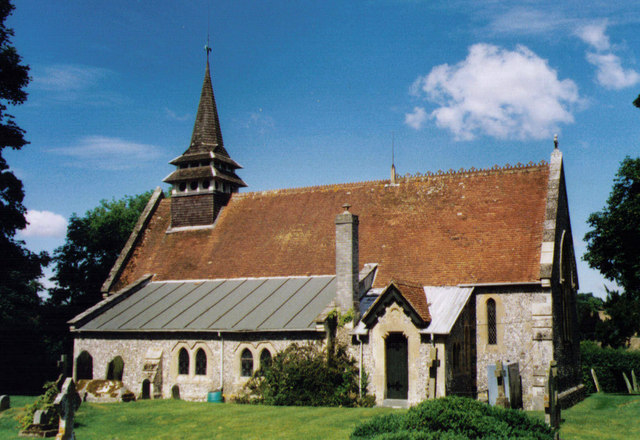
- St Lawrence's Church, Weston Patrick

- Location within Hampshire
- OS grid reference: SU6898946963
- District: Basingstoke and Deane
- Shire county: Hampshire
- Region: South East
- Country: England
- Sovereign state: United Kingdom
- Post town: BASINGSTOKE
- Postcode district: RG25
- Dialling code: 01256
- Police: Hampshire and Isle of Wight
- Fire: Hampshire and Isle of Wight
- Ambulance: South Central
- UK Parliament: Basingstoke

Weston Patrick is a small village and civil parish in Hampshire. It lies four miles (6 km) southeast from Basingstoke and covers an area of 1,183 acres (4.79 km^{2}). Weston Patrick is divided from the neighbouring parish of Weston Corbett by the road leading to the village of Upton Grey.

The former BBC Gardener's World presenter Monty Don grew up in the village.

== Manor ==
The manor of Weston Patrick, which probably derives its name from its 13th-century owner, 'Patrick de Chaworth', was held of the king in chief by the service of suit at the Odiham Hundred. It is not mentioned in the Domesday Survey, and was then probably included in the extensive manor of Odiham. The first known owner of the manor was William Briwere, and it was probably granted to him by King Richard I or King John, with both of whom he was in great favour. The manor passed from William in the same way as King's Somborne and became part of the Duchy of Lancaster. It remained in the Crown until 1546–47, when it was granted by Henry VIII to Lawrence Herward.

== Humbly Grove Oil Field and Gas Storage ==
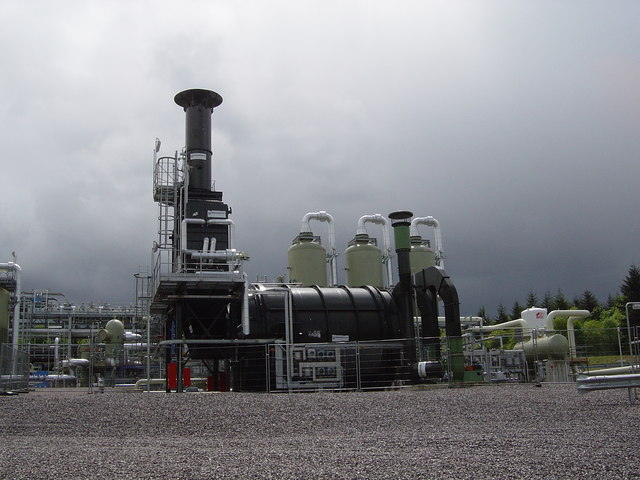
Humbly Grove gas facility, Weston Common

The Humbly Grove oil field, north and east of the airfield, was discovered in 1980 and production began in 1984, with up to 1000 barrels a day of crude oil being piped to the terminal at Holybourne, near Alton. In 1995 the oil field was developed into an underground gas storage facility, with a gas pipeline linking it to the national gas grid at Barton Stacey. The replenished gas cap on the oil field increased the pressure on the remaining oil, boosting production and increasing the lifetime of the extraction.

== See also ==
- The Hundred of Odiham
