= Micheldever Station =

Village in Hampshire, England

Coordinates: 51.1820°N 1.2622°W

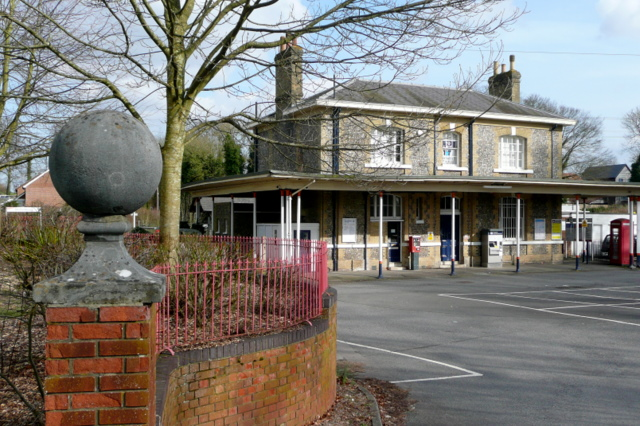

- Location within Hampshire
- Civil parish: Micheldever
- District: City of Winchester
- Shire county: Hampshire
- Region: South East
- Country: England
- Sovereign state: United Kingdom
- Police: Hampshire and Isle of Wight
- Fire: Hampshire and Isle of Wight
- Ambulance: South Central

Micheldever Station is a village in the civil parish of Micheldever in the City of Winchester, which is in turn a district of the county of Hampshire, England. The village takes its name from the eponymous railway station, around which it grew up.

Following the construction of the railway station, originally known as Andover Road but later renamed Micheldever, a cluster of houses and small shops including The Canada Stores were attracted to the area. No shops remain, though there is a tyre merchant and trailer supplier trading there. The village has a pub, The Dove Inn.

The village is about 2.4 miles north of the village of Micheldever, after which the station is named.
