= Stoke Charity =

Village and parish in Hampshire, England

Coordinates: 51.151250°N 1.307865°W

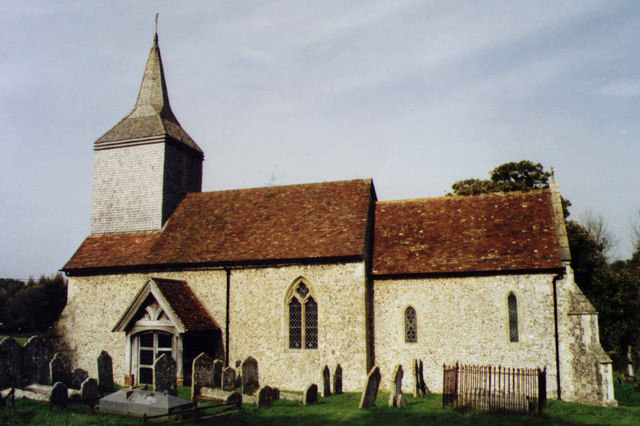

- Location within Hampshire
- OS grid reference: SU4850639338
- Civil parish: Wonston
- District: City of Winchester
- Shire county: Hampshire
- Region: South East
- Country: England
- Sovereign state: United Kingdom
- Post town: WINCHESTER
- Postcode district: SO21 3
- Dialling code: 01962
- Police: Hampshire and Isle of Wight
- Fire: Hampshire and Isle of Wight
- Ambulance: South Central
- UK Parliament: Winchester

Stoke Charity is a small village and former civil parish, now in the parish of Wonston, in the City of Winchester district of Hampshire, England. It is on the River Dever, its nearest town is Winchester, which lies approximately 6.1 miles (9.9 km) south-west from the village. In 1931 the parish had a population of 111.

In past centuries, the manor was also known as Old Stoke, still remembered in the street name "Old Stoke Road".

== History ==
Stoke Charity is mentioned in the Domesday Book of 1086, where it appears as Stoches. It appears as Stokecharite circa 1270. It was held by Henry de la Charite in the thirteenth century, so 'Charity' is thus a family name.

In 904, Edward the Elder probably granted the area of the present parish to Hyde Abbey as part of the manor of Micheldever. The Church of England parish church of St Mary and St Michael dates mainly from the 12th and 13th centuries. According to the church's guidebook, the Norman nave and chancel may have been added to a small Saxon church to form the north aisle of an enlarged church. The church stands in a field just to the east of the village.

Stoke Charity also had a manor house and home farm, which employed most of the population as farm labourers up until the late 19th century. Watercress beds were well developed and numerous in Stoke Charity until recently. These were fed by the River Dever, which is a tributary of the River Test. Some watercress beds have been brought back into use as of 2020.

On 1 April 1932 the parish was abolished and merged with Wonston.
