= Subgiant (band) =

UK musical group

- Origin: London, UK
- Genres: Electronic dance music
- Years active: 2000 – present
- Labels: Blissfields Records
- Members: Olly Maw; Dan Hayes; Tushar Joshi; Dale Titus; Lizzy Munro
- Website: www.subgiant.co.uk

Subgiant is a UK electro trio founded in London, consisting of Olly Maw, Dan Hayes, and Tushar Joshi, formed in 2000. Subgiant have made appearances at festivals such as Glastonbury, Bestival, Blissfields and Glade Festival as well as various clubs worldwide.

== History ==
Olly Maw and Dan Hayes met as bassist and DJ (respectively) in 2000, and formed what, in its early days, was a dub act. In 2004 Tushar Joshi joined on electro drums after a chance encounter at Blissfields festival 2003. The band then concentrated on the live performance of electro music-orientated music. Dale Titus joined the band as its vocalist, specialising in rap. Lizzy Munro was the last to join the band as their saxophone player but had to leave in 2018 due to moving away.

The band soon found themselves breaking on to the UK festival scene, with appearances at Glastonbury in 2004, Bestival in 2005, and Blissfields. This was soon followed by the band's first album in 2005, Advances in Twig Technology, on Blissfields Records. BBC Radio 1 DJ Rob Da Bank booked the band for three consecutive years at the Bestival on the Isle of Wight, and this was followed by appearances at The Levellers` Beautiful Days (festival), and the Larmer Tree Festival. In 2013 the band headlined the Maker Sunshine Solstice Festival on the Rame Peninsular.

As of 2024, Subgiant continue to play the festival circuit.

== Musicology ==
The band play many genres of dance music through their gigs and mainly concentrate on Electro, House, Breaks, Dubstep, Drum and Bass, Techno and Trance.

== Discography ==
=== Albums ===
- Advances in Twig Technology (Blissfields Records, 2005)
- Global Control (Blissfields Records, 2006)
- This (2008)
- Mayday (Nomansland 2017)
