= St Lawrence's Church, Weston Patrick =

Coordinates: 51.217707°N 1.013591°W

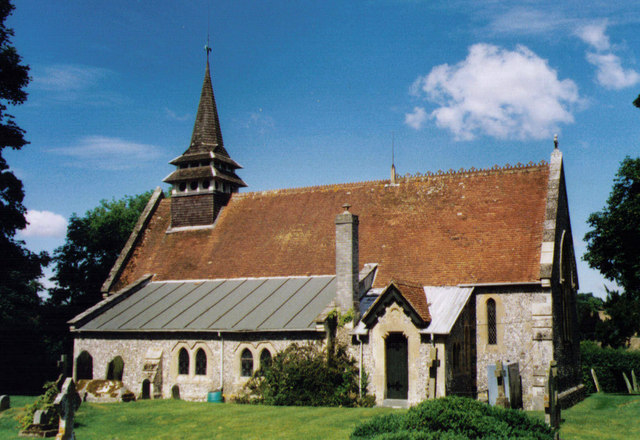
- St Lawrence's from the south

- Location within Hampshire
- OS grid reference: SU 69094 46891
- Location: Weston Patrick, Hampshire
- Country: England
- Denomination: Anglican

History
- Status: Parish church
- Founded: 12th century, rebuilt 1868
- Dedication: St Lawrence

Architecture
- Functional status: Active
- Heritage designation: Listed building – Grade II*
- Architect: Thomas Henry Wyatt
- Style: Gothic Revival

Specifications
- Materials: Stone, flint

Administration
- Province: Canterbury
- Diocese: Winchester

Clergy
- Bishop: Bishop of Winchester
- Rector: The Revd Peter Dyson

St Lawrence's Church is an Anglican church in the village of Weston Patrick, Hampshire, England. It is a Grade II* listed building and stands on the eastern side of the village near its highest point. English Heritage calls it a "small-scale gem of English Gothic".

== History ==
=== Norman church ===
The only remaining part of the church that dates from the Norman period is the north doorway from the end of the 12th century, which has a rounded arch with a rolled edge and label with double-champfering. This is now topped with a timber gabled frame. A drawing dated c. 1810 shows that the east window was topped by a rounded Norman arch, where today it is a pointed Gothic arch.

=== 19th-century rebuilding ===
The church was rebuilt on the site of the Norman church in the Gothic Revival style by Thomas Henry Wyatt, who is buried in the churchyard, and whose family still live in the village. When the family came to live in the village in the 1850s the original church, although still in use and officiated by Revd T. B. Round, was in a run-down state. Wyatt decided to appoint a rector in 1866 and build a parsonage for him, before the rebuilding of the church started in 1867–68. The builder was John Wilkes of North Waltham, and the cost was £1,692; of this, a subscription raised £691, and the Wyatt family paid the remainder. Revd Terry was the first rector of the church, which was consecrated in June 1868.

The exterior is flint and dressed in stone. The roof is red tiled, with a shingled broach spire on the west end, which Pevsner calls a "funny pagoda bell tower".

The nave and chancel are the same width, and the ceiling of the chancel is painted dark blue, with gold stars; the floor is paved with encaustic tiles. The organ, a Willis "Scudamore" model built by Henry Willis & Sons, is in a southern recess besides the chancel; it has Bourdon pipes and until 1965 was blown by hand. The bell turret with a single bell is at the western end. Pevsner notes there is "some rich foliage carving" inside the church. The east window was a gift from Thomas Henry Wyatt, and the three west windows, including the rose "Nativity" window, were made by Lavers and Barraud.

On the church walls is a fragment of an embroidered altar cloth bearing the initials GG George Green, of Western Corbett House and IR, and the date 1682.

== Gallery ==
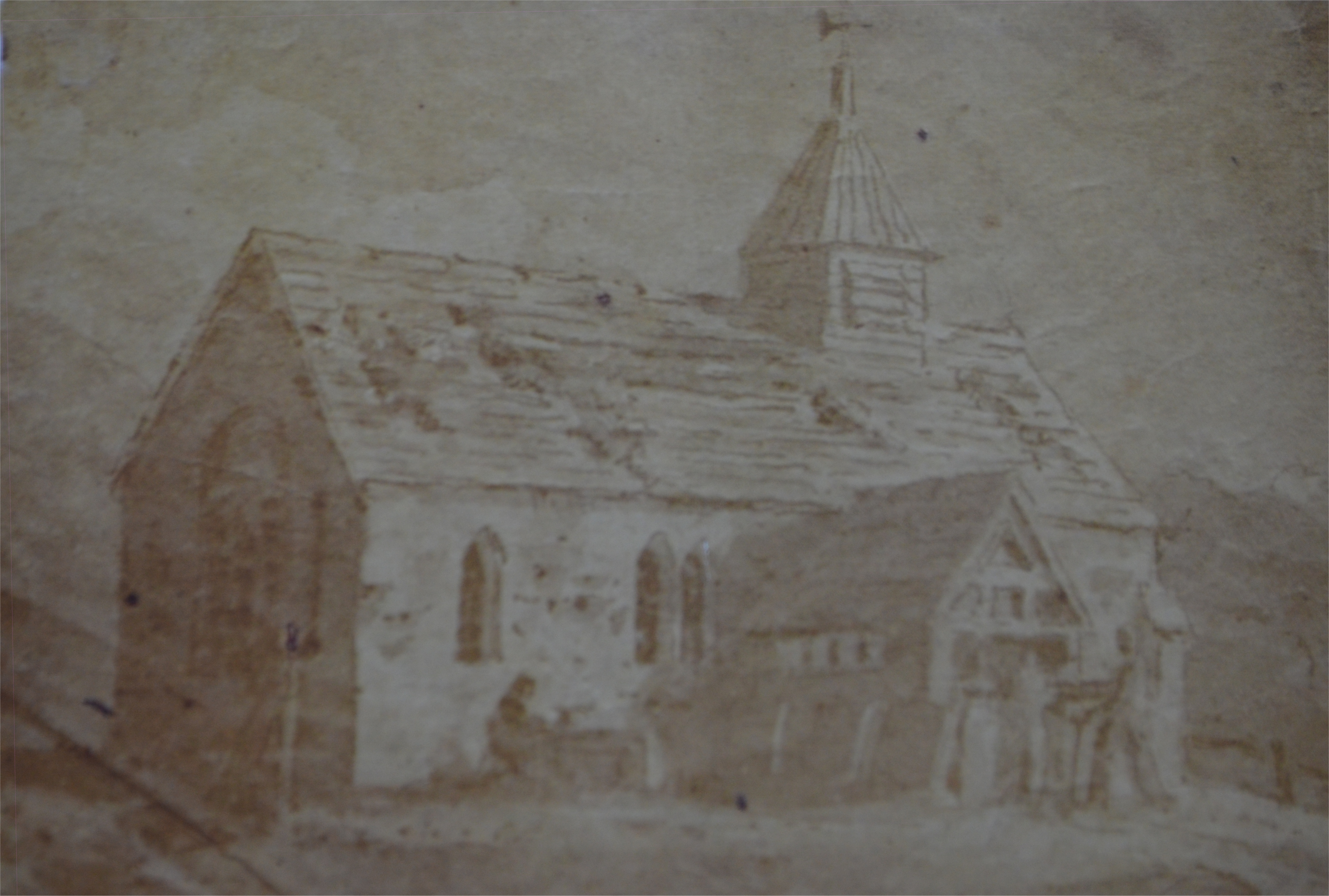
The old church, c. 1810

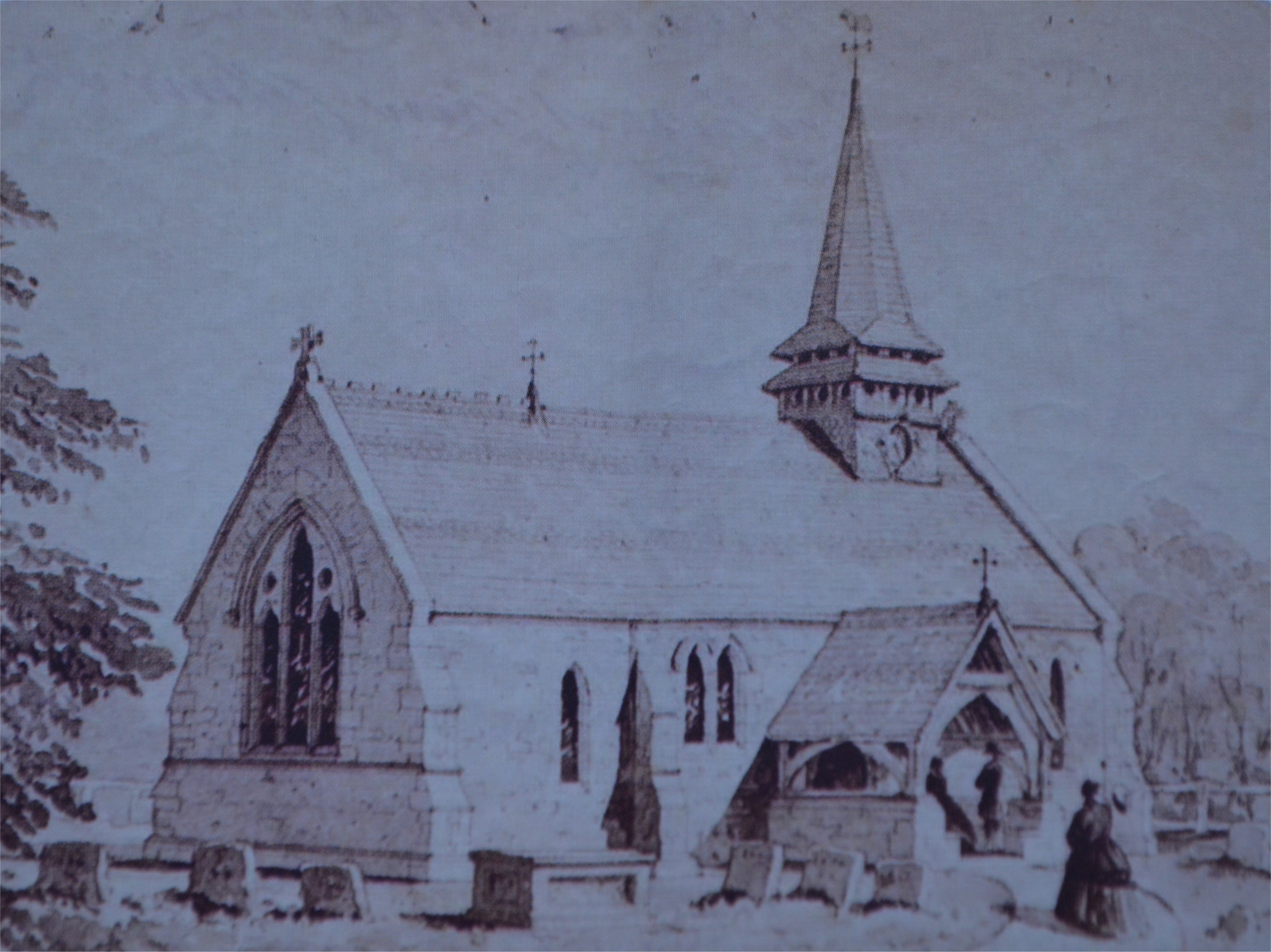
The new church in 1868,
the year it was completed

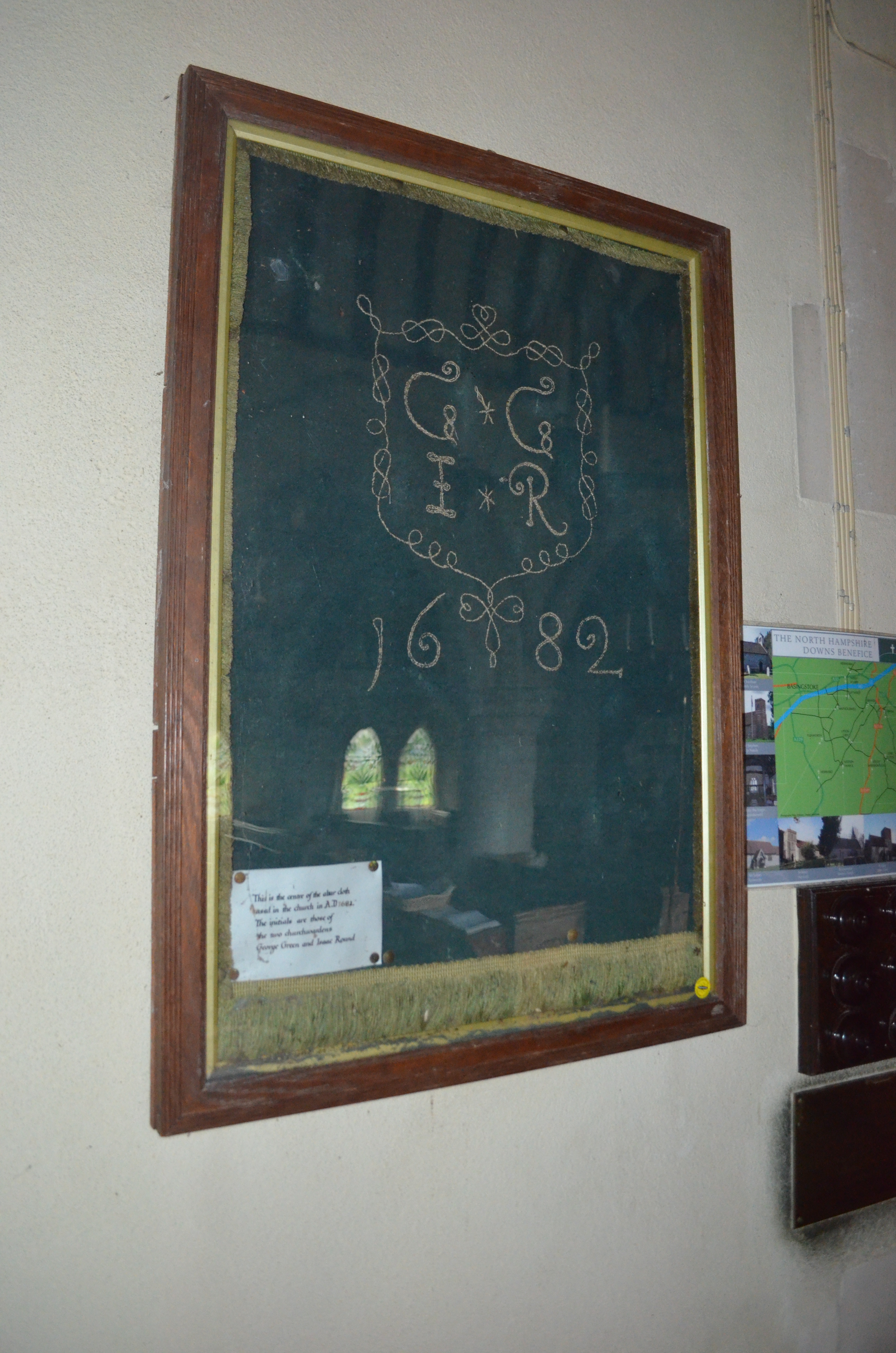
Altar cloth fragment, dated 1682

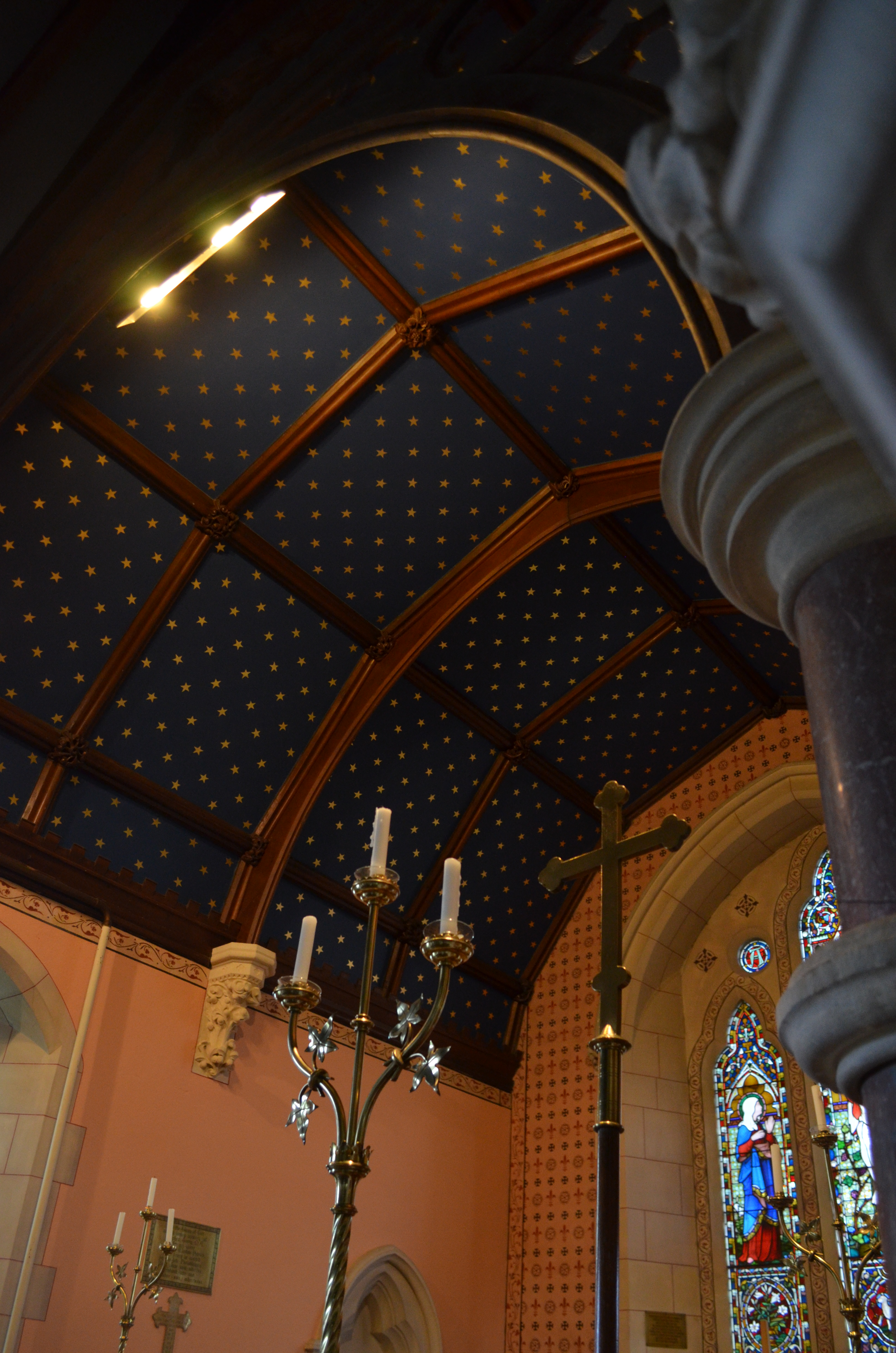
Chancel ceiling

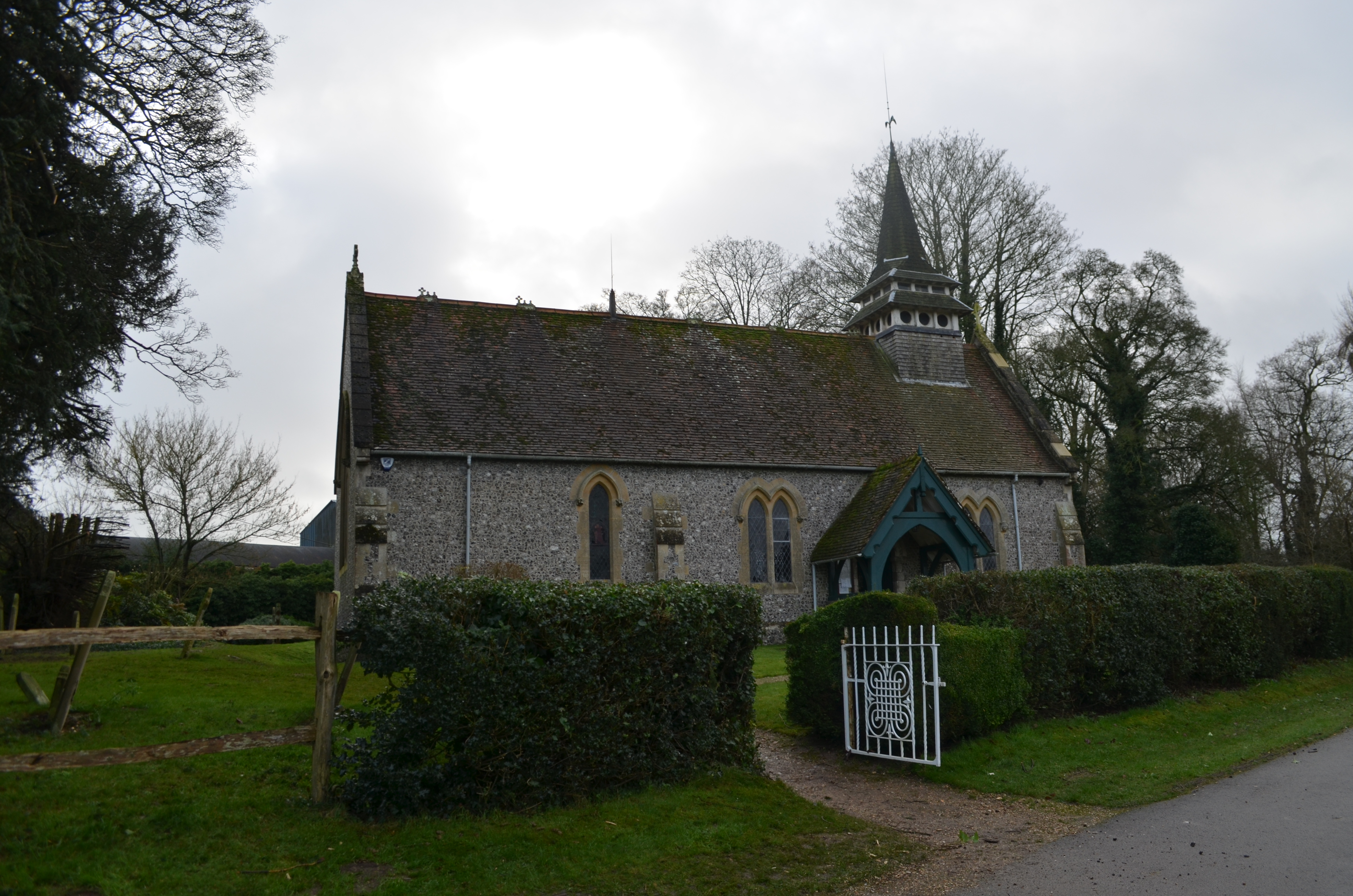
From north

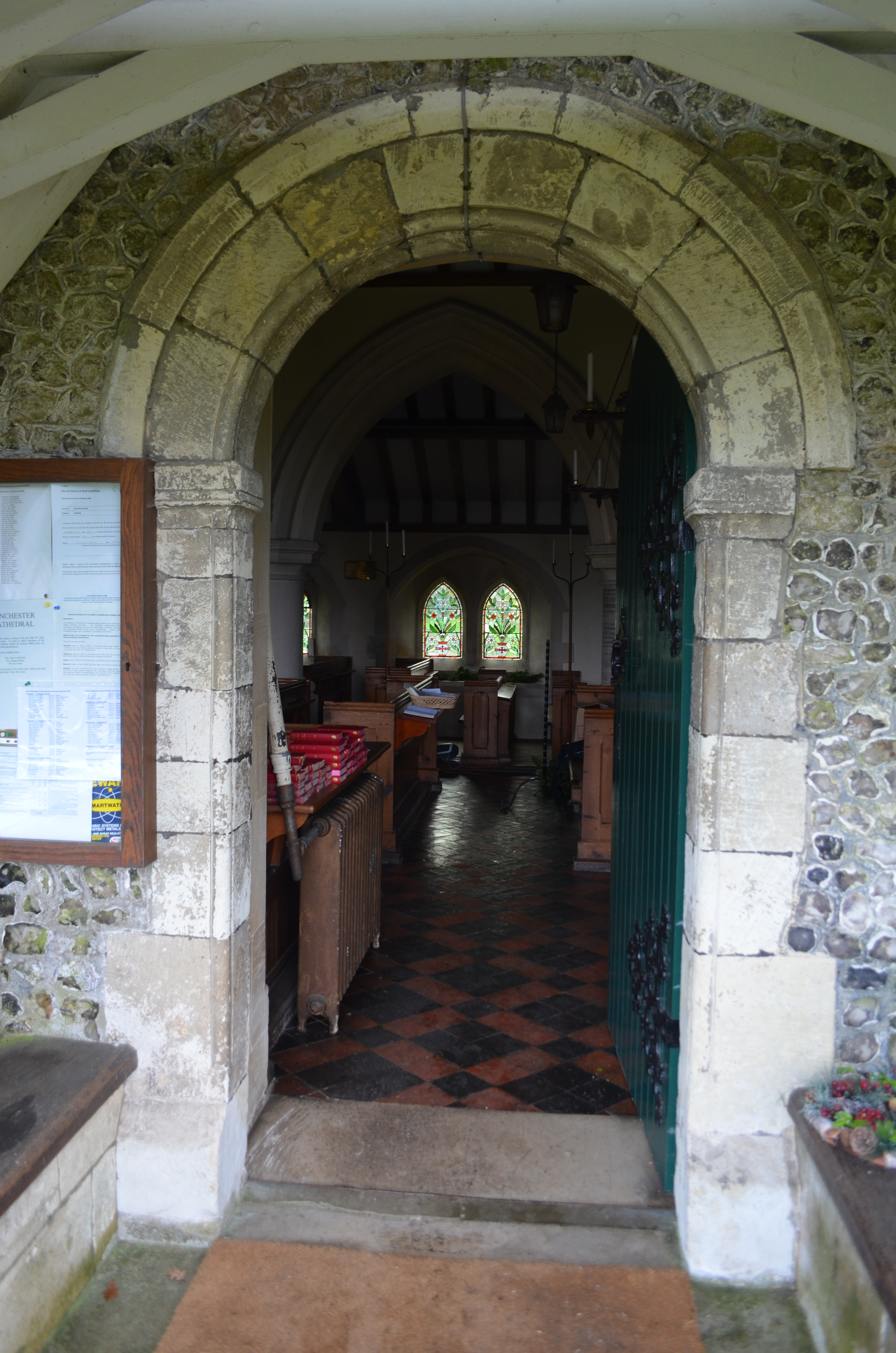
Norman north doorway,
late 12th century

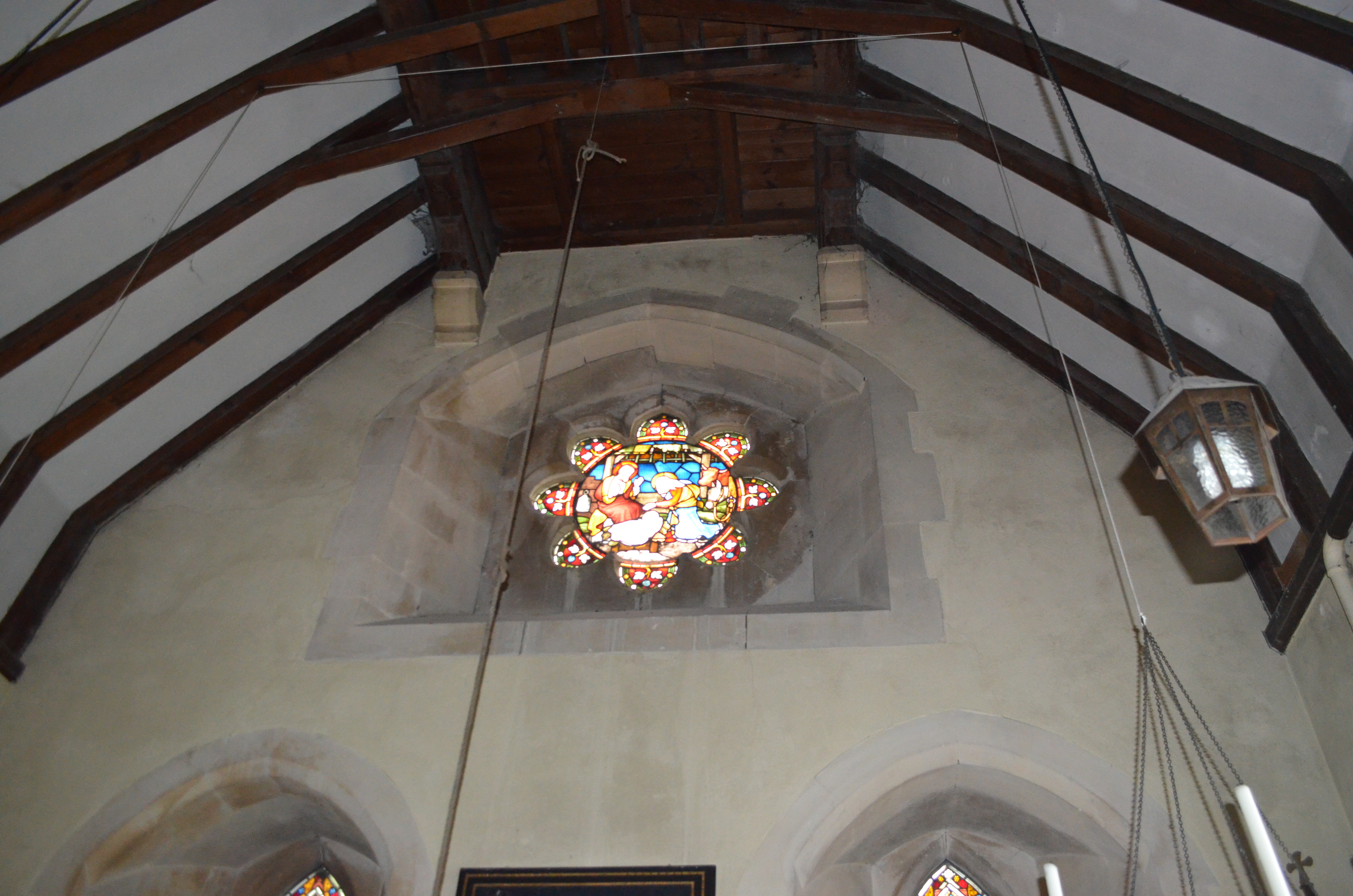
West "Nativity" window
