= Weston Corbett =

Village and parish in Hampshire, England

Coordinates: 51.2175°N 1.0162°W

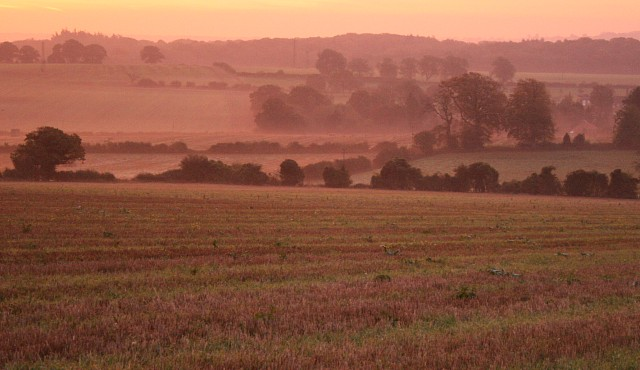
- Dawn across the fields

- Location within Hampshire
- OS grid reference: SU6880346940
- Civil parish: Weston Corbett
- District: Basingstoke and Deane
- Shire county: Hampshire
- Region: South East
- Country: England
- Sovereign state: United Kingdom
- Post town: Basingstoke
- Postcode district: RG25
- Dialling code: 01256
- Police: Hampshire and Isle of Wight
- Fire: Hampshire and Isle of Wight
- Ambulance: South Central
- UK Parliament: Basingstoke

Weston Corbett is a hamlet and civil parish in Hampshire and lies three miles south from Basingstoke. There is only one mention of Weston Corbett in the Domesday Survey of 1086. The first reference to Weston Corbett occurs in 1224, when the land belonged to the Crown and was held by Thomas Corbett. Although the Corbett family gave their name to the parish, the land at Weston Corbett has subsequently changed hands many times.

In 1316, Weston Corbett was a hamlet but, by 1801, there were only 10 inhabitants. The population has increased slightly since this date, but the settlement still comprises only a few houses and two farms. A church is known to have existed, and was first mentioned in 1305. It was, however, in ruins by the end of the 16th century. The site of the church is not known, although it is believed to have been sited north or west of Manor Farm.

== See also ==
- Weston Patrick
- The Hundred of Odiham
