= Westwick Row =

Hamlet in Hertfordshire, England

Coordinates: 51.749°N 0.421°W

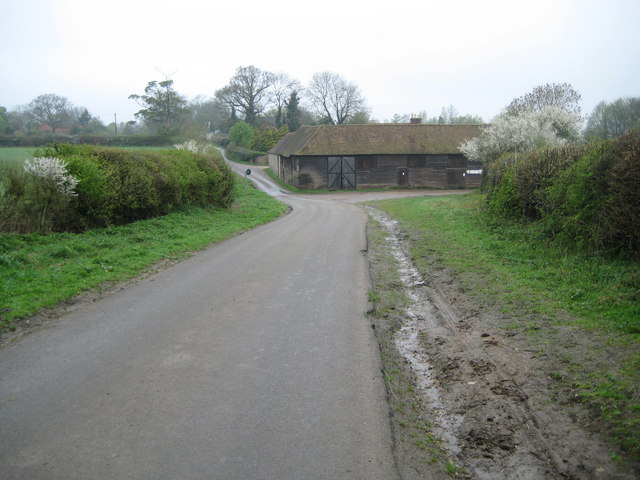
Westwick Row

Westwick Row is a place in Hertfordshire, in England. It is situated on the edge of Hemel Hempstead.

Westwick Row today is a narrow rural lane in the village of Leverstock Green, part of it is within the jurisdiction of St Albans Rural District Council, and part with Dacorum Borough Council. It was originally within the parish of St Michael's, St Albans. It runs into the main St Albans Road at its most easterly end, at Corner Farm, and into Green Lane at its most westerly end, being connected to the main road also by Pancake Lane. At the 2011 Census the population was still included in the City of St Albans Ward of St. Michaels.

It was once the central lane of the medieval vill and Manor of Westwick, and indications are that it was not only the main thoroughfare in medieval times, but was also the main thoroughfare of the Anglo Saxon village and manor of the same name, and indeed was in all probability an Iron Age trackway. The line of the original Iron Age trackway continues at the westerly end via Buncefield Lane.

Several listed buildings are to be found along Westwick Row, namely: Dell Cottage (early to mid 17th century); Westwick Cottage (Grade II* late 12th century/early 13th century with later additions); King Charles II Cottage (17th century); Westwick Row Farmhouse (15th century); Westwick Row Farm Barns (18th century); Corner Farm House (16th century); and Corner Farm outbuildings (18th century). Westwick Farm, known to have dated back to the Tudor era was in a poor state of repair and was demolished in the mid 19th century by the Earl of Verulam when the farm was added to the portfolio of his estate of Gorhambury. It was replaced with the present farmhouse.

From at least the early 19th century to the early 20th century several farm labourers' cottages were also to be found along Westwick Row. These were gradually demolished in the 20th century when new housing was built in Curtis Road. Several good sized properties were further built at the western end of the Row in the early to mid 20th century, and a small estate of executive houses were built on the site of Handpost Lodge.

Evidence points to a Great Tithe Barn, belonging to the Monastery at St Albans, which once stood along Westwick Row near to the present day Westwick Warren. This was demolished in the mid 17th century.

Evidence of a Romano-British Villa at Handpost Lodge, Westwick Row was discovered in 1998. Other archaeological finds date to the Late Neolithic, Bronze & Iron Ages and includes a Bronze Age hoard discovered by Sir John Evans in the mid 19th century. This consisted of a looped socketed bronze axe, fragments of another axe and five lumps of copper. With the exception of one lump of metal that John Evans donated to the British Museum, the rest of the find is at the Ashmolean Museum in Oxford.
