= Village Store =

- U.S. National Register of Historic Places
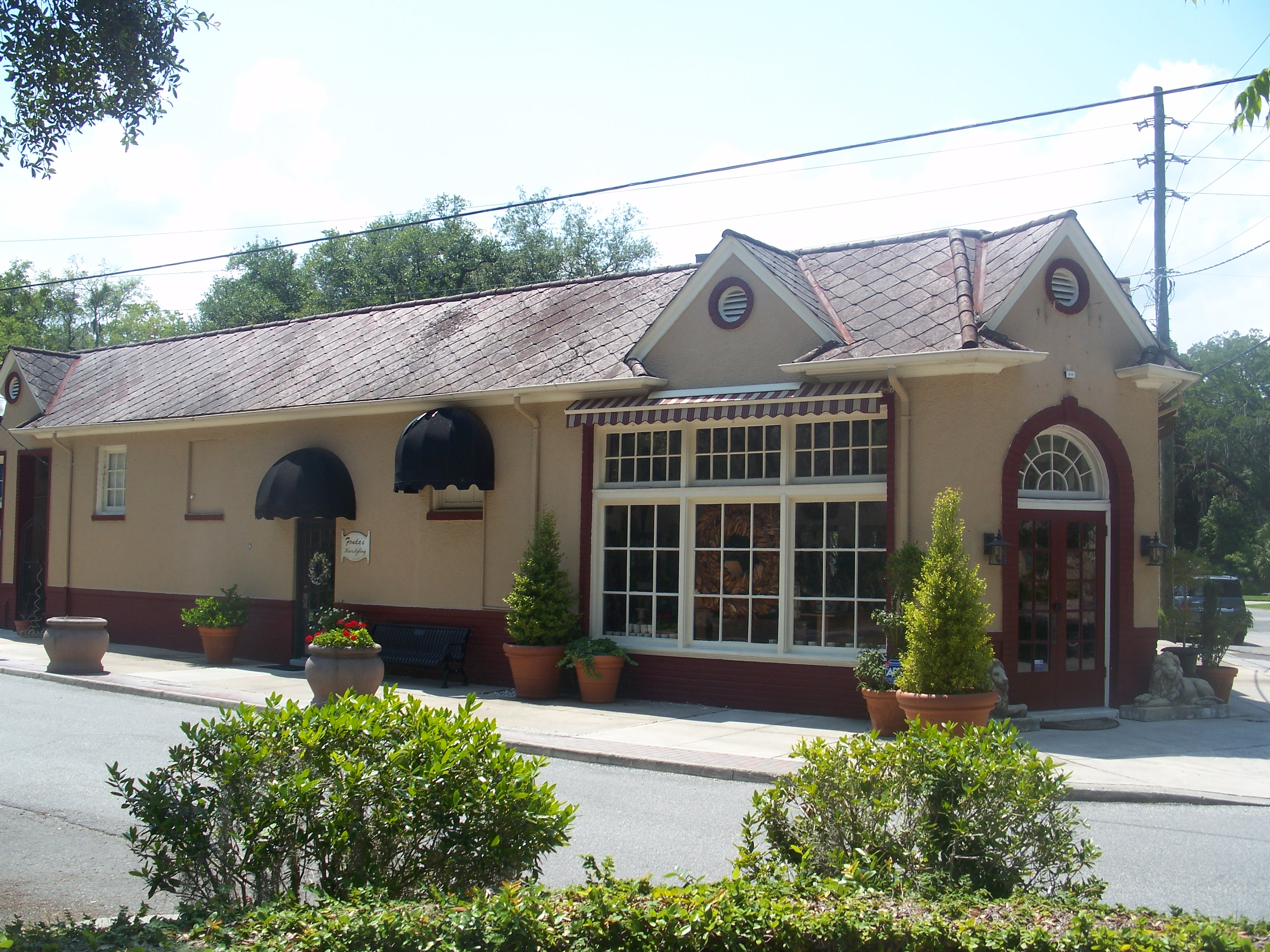

- Location within Florida Location within the United States
- Location: Jacksonville, Florida, USA
- Coordinates: 30°16′19″N 81°42′18″W
- Architectural style: Colonial Revival
- NRHP reference No.: 88001700
- Added to NRHP: September 29, 1988

The Village Store (also known as the Oxford Place) is a historic site in Jacksonville, Florida. It is located at 4216, 4212, and 4208 Oxford Avenue, and 2906 and 2902 Corinthian Avenue. On September 29, 1988, it was added to the U.S. National Register of Historic Places.
