= Wonston =

Village and parish in Hampshire, England

Coordinates: 51.152546°N 1.321095°W

- Location within Hampshire
- Population: 1,283; 1,446 (2011 Census)
- OS grid reference: SU4758039473
- District: Winchester
- Shire county: Hampshire
- Region: South East
- Country: England
- Sovereign state: United Kingdom
- Post town: WINCHESTER
- Postcode district: SO21
- Dialling code: 01962
- Police: Hampshire and Isle of Wight
- Fire: Hampshire and Isle of Wight
- Ambulance: South Central
- UK Parliament: Winchester

Wonston is a village and civil parish in the City of Winchester district of Hampshire, England. The village had 1446 usual residents as of Census day 2011. The civil parish includes the settlements of Sutton Scotney, Stoke Charity, Norton and Hunton.

== History ==
Located in the Hundred of Buddlesgate, the Manor of Wonston is listed in the Domesday Book as belonging to the Bishop of Winchester.

St Michael's Parish Church is a Grade I listed building, dating back to 1190, and the former Rectory, a Grade II* listed building, dates from the late 14th century.

George Ridding and Lady Laura Ridding moved to the then Rectory at Wonston following his retirement as Bishop of Southwell in 1903, and Lady Laura remained there until her death in 1939.

== Geography ==
The northern boundary of the Civil Parish is marked by the southern boundary of Freefolk Wood.

The A303 Primary Route passes through the northern section of the parish, eastbound it enters the parish at a point approx 700m east of Bullington Cross and leaves the parish at Kiteland Cottages. A road generally more than 4m wide leaves Sutton Scotney and heads northeast exiting the parish at Kitelands cottages. The northwest "corner" of the parish is a point approx 200m north of Blind End copse at the southeast corner of Freefolk wood. The northeast "corner" of the parish is at the west side of Kitelands clump The southeast "corner" of the parish is at the point where the northern portal of the Wallers Ash railway tunnel intersects with the Alresford Drove Track.

== Governance ==
Wonston is part of the Wonston and Micheldever ward which elects three Councillors to Winchester City Council, as well as the Itchen Valley ward which elects a councillor to Hampshire County Council.
