= Micheldever =

Village and civil parish in Hampshire, England

Coordinates: 51.148569°N 1.265595°W

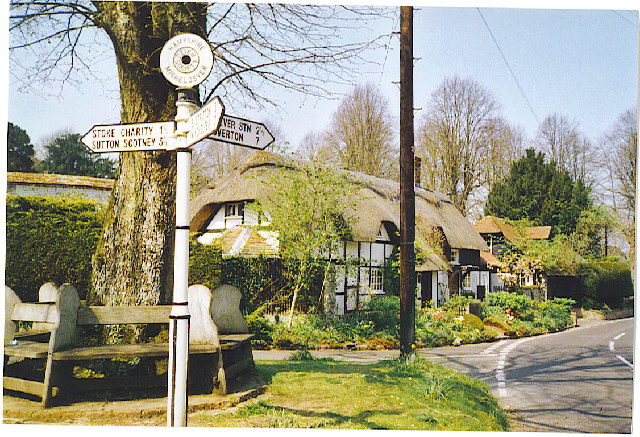
- Thatched cottages in Micheldever

- Location within Hampshire
- Population: 800; 1,387 (2011 Census)
- OS grid reference: SU5146639068
- Civil parish: Micheldever
- District: City of Winchester
- Shire county: Hampshire
- Region: South East
- Country: England
- Sovereign state: United Kingdom
- Post town: WINCHESTER
- Postcode district: SO21
- Dialling code: 01962
- Police: Hampshire and Isle of Wight
- Fire: Hampshire and Isle of Wight
- Ambulance: South Central
- UK Parliament: Winchester

Micheldever /mɪtʃəlˈdɛvər/ is a village and civil parish in Hampshire, England, situated 6 miles (10 km) north of Winchester. It lies upon the River Dever /ˈdiːvər/.

The river, and village, formerly part of Stratton Park, lie on a Hampshire grass downland, underlain with chalk and flint. Parts of the river now disappear in summer through lack of replenishment, evaporation and, more specifically, the porous nature of the bedrock.

== Governance ==
=== Micheldever Parish ===
The civil parish of Micheldever is the most northerly such parish in the City of Winchester, a local government district that stretches far beyond the urban area of Winchester. The parish incorporates Micheldever, Micheldever Station (a separate village), East Stratton, West Stratton, Weston Colley, and Woodmancott.

=== Council ===
Micheldever is part of the Wonston and Micheldever ward which elects three councillors to Winchester City Council, as well as the wider Itchen Valley ward which elects a single councillor to Hampshire County Council.

== Facilities ==
The CofE Church of St Mary the Virgin; Micheldever telephone exchange; Micheldever Church of England Primary School; The Half Moon And Spread Eagle public house.

== Micheldever Nude ==
A renowned photograph by Bill Brandt, Micheldever Nude (1948), was taken inside Micheldever House, the home of the photographer's father, L. W. Brandt. L. W. Brandt died in 1965, aged 89, and is believed to be buried in Micheldever churchyard.

== Buildings ==
The oldest property in Micheldever village itself lies on The Crease, Duke Street. Shillingbury (88) and Corner Cottage (89) make up the old Hall House built c. 1453. Made from traditional materials and methods The Crease lies to the south east of St. Mary The Virgin church. Local folklore has for a long time believed it to be a Pilgrims' Hospice. However, although the land was owned by the Abbot and Monks of Newminster, it is more likely to have been a wealthy yeoman. Shillingbury forms the main hall, cross passage and first bedchamber. Corner Cottage forms the parlour and second bedchamber together with an extension to join it to the old Forge.

The building is the only house to have been built using a jetty without a cantilever. The hall contains a rare jointed cruck, an arched beam from one side of the house to the other. In the 16th century the hall was floored. The large carved beam that supports the floor is thought to have come from Hyde Abbey.

== Transport ==
The village is served by Micheldever railway station – located 2 miles (3 km) to the north – on the main railway line between London and Southampton, in the village of Micheldever Station. It is the only station between Basingstoke and Winchester; its remote existence explained by its original name of Andover Road; the town of Andover not receiving its own station until much later. Micheldever Station was the starting point for the first automobile journey in Britain, in 1895.

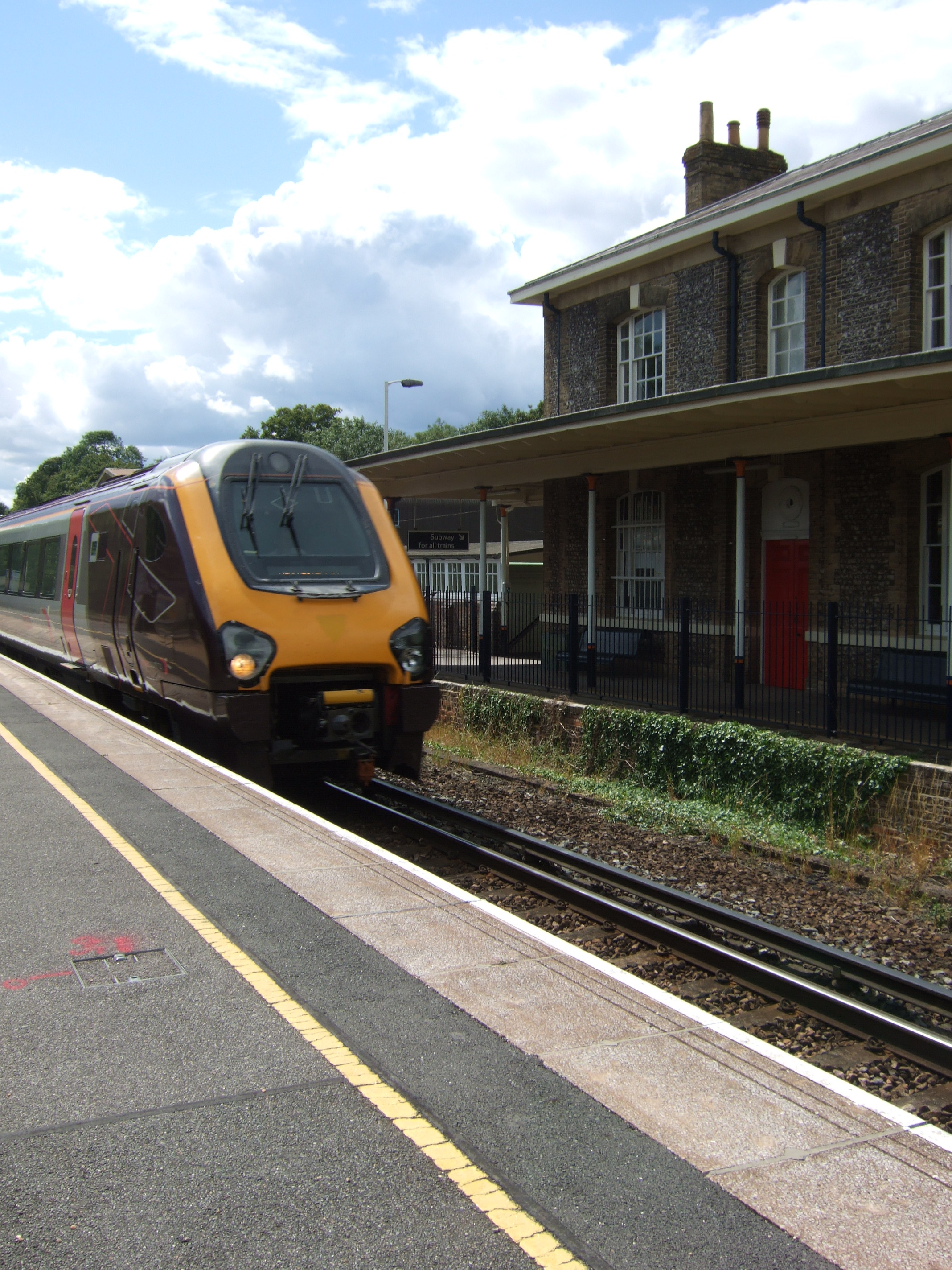
CrossCountry train travelling northbound through Micheldever Station August 2014

Micheldever is located 3 miles (5 km) from the A303 to the West Country, and 5 miles (8 km) from Junction 8 of the M3 motorway. The village lies approximately 1.5 miles (2.4 km) off the A33 road, originally a Roman road which, until the opening of the M3 extension in 1985, was the main route for traffic between Southampton and London.

== First automobile journey ==
Micheldever Station was the starting point for the first automobile journey in Britain, in 1895. The vehicle, a Daimler-engined Panhard-Levassor, had been ordered from France by the Hon Evelyn Ellis (1843–1913). It was transported across the channel by ferry and then to Micheldever Station by train. Ellis received delivery on the platform and drove the vehicle to Datchet, deliberately testing an Act of Parliament that required all self-propelled vehicles on public roads to travel at no more than 4 mph and to be preceded by a man waving a red flag. Ellis was not arrested and the Act was repealed in 1896.

== Waste conversion plant ==
Clean Power Properties had plans to build a waste conversion plant at Micheldever Station. This had been referred to in the press as a waste incinerator. The plans were withdrawn in 2015.

== In Tolkien's works ==
In J. R. R. Tolkien's Middle-earth, one of the hobbit settlements in The Shire is called Michel Delving, a pun on both the real world village and an Anglo-Saxon phrase meaning extensive digging.
