= Bransbury =

Hamlet in Hampshire, England

Coordinates: 51°10′55″N 1°22′23″W

- Hamlet
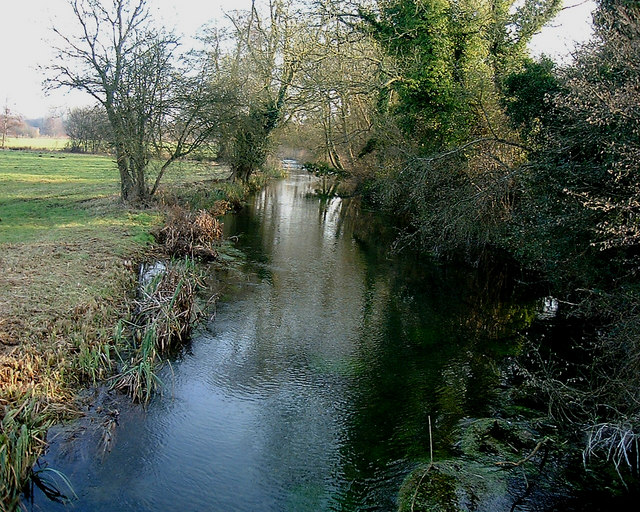
- The River Dever at Bransbury

- Location within Hampshire
- Population: 100
- OS grid reference: SU4108940407
- District: Test Valley
- Shire county: Hampshire
- Region: South East
- Country: England
- Sovereign state: United Kingdom
- Post town: Winchester
- Dialling code: 01264
- Police: Hampshire and Isle of Wight
- Fire: Hampshire and Isle of Wight
- Ambulance: South Central
- UK Parliament: Romsey and Southampton North

Bransbury is a hamlet in Hampshire, England, part of the parish of Barton Stacey. The nearest village is Barton Stacey (where the 2011 census was included), halfway between Winchester and Andover; there is a junction for Bransbury on the A303 towards Exeter. Bransbury has twenty-two dwellings: a collection of agricultural workers’ cottages with gardens of generous proportions, Bransbury Manor, which dates from the 18th century, and Bransbury Mill, a Grade II listed building. The hamlet straddles the River Dever.

The road from Barton Stacey to Bransbury is prone to pooling water, because of its position on the flood plain.

== History ==
The Anglo-Saxon Chronicles and Charters contain the first written record (855 AD) of Bransbury.

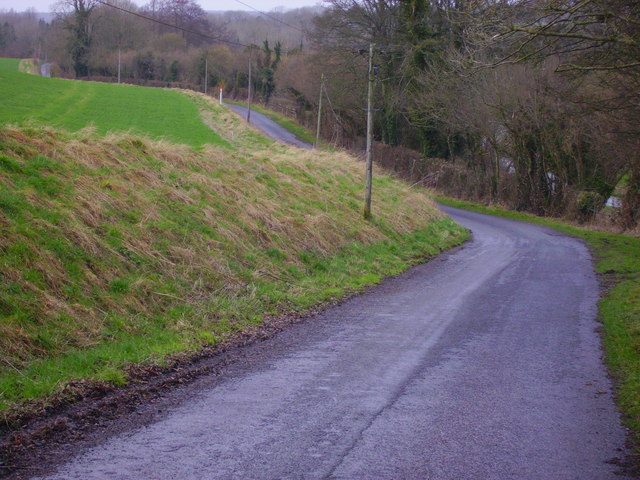
The road to Bransbury

The Andyke in Bransbury is an Iron Age ditch and bank survival of a promontory fort with evidence of round houses, and is a Historic England Scheduled Monument. The course of the Roman road which crosses the parish via Bransbury Common can be traced from Winchester to Marlborough and beyond towards Cirencester. There is also evidence of a Roman camp east of Manor Farm, with the remains of ditches and banks. Further evidence of Romano-British inhabitants was found in 1977 with the discovery of a "plank" burial of a young woman between Barton Stacey and Bransbury.

The manor of Bransbury has been farmed from at least the time of Domesday, and was granted by Henry VIII to the Dean and Chapter of Winchester Cathedral and their successors for a yearly rent. The four terraced houses known as The Barracks are Grade II listed buildings. Development in recent times has been limited to the conversion of farm buildings.

== Bransbury Common ==
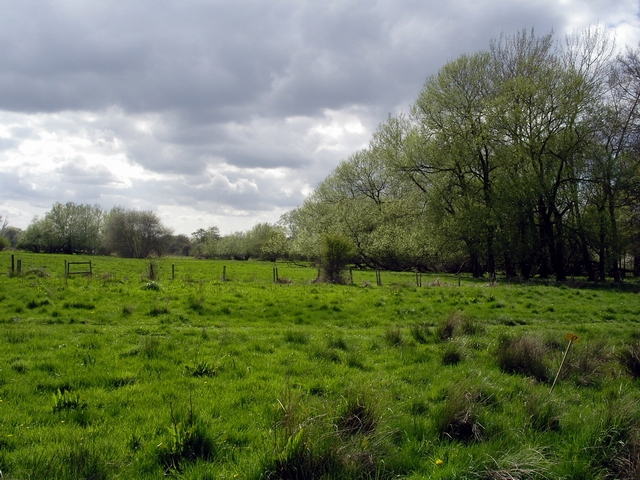
Bransbury Common

Bransbury Common is a stretch of common land between Bransbury and Newton Stacey. It is classified as a SSSI and a nature conservation area. It consists of broadleaved, mixed, and yew woodland, fenland, marshland, swamp, and has the river Dever joining the river Test. It consists of 392 acres (160 hectares) of common land and disused water meadows, embracing a remarkable range of grass and sedgeland that is probably unparalleled in southern England. It is also a public access area that is subject to the Countryside Right of Way (CRoW) Act 2000.

The common is popular with walkers, who admire the broad and bushy riverside pasture with views of Harewood Forest. The path is ill-defined in places, and it is advisable to keep close to the left edge of the common to avoid the marsh. The common is very popular with birdwatchers, and often has cows grazing on it.
