= Sutton Scotney =

Village in Hampshire, England

Coordinates: 51.1528°N 1.3393°W

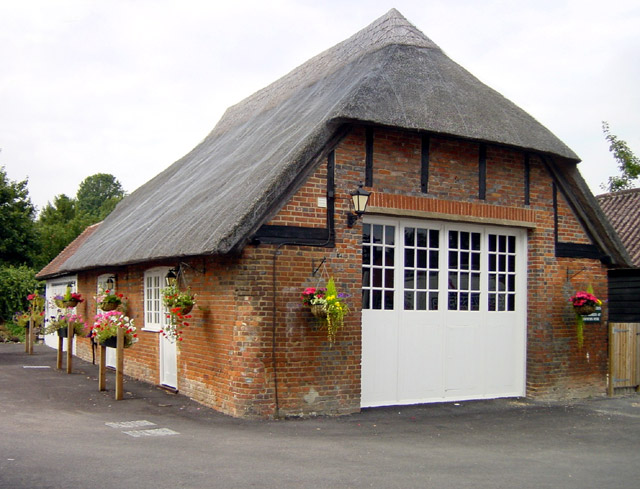
- The Old Fire Station

- Location within Hampshire
- Population: 1,346
- OS grid reference: SU463395
- Civil parish: Wonston
- District: Winchester
- Shire county: Hampshire
- Region: South East
- Country: England
- Sovereign state: United Kingdom
- Post town: WINCHESTER
- Postcode district: SO21
- Dialling code: 01962
- Police: Hampshire and Isle of Wight
- Fire: Hampshire and Isle of Wight
- Ambulance: South Central
- UK Parliament: Winchester

Sutton Scotney is a village in Hampshire, England, north of Winchester in the civil parish of Wonston.

It lies alongside the River Dever and is now bypassed by the A34 trunk road. It is notable for having been the site of numerous Spitfire crashes in the Second World War.

It has a population of more than 200, and had a watercress-based economy. Its best-known resident was J. Arthur Rank who took the name of the village as part of his title when he was ennobled.

The village pub, the Coach & Horses, dates back to 1762. The pub was recently refurbished and converted the former thatched village Fire station into bed and breakfast rooms.

The village is home to Naomi House & Jacksplace, hospices that care for life-limited children and young people from across the Wessex region.

== Transport ==
Stagecoach bus route 75 (Andover to Winchester) serves Sutton Scotney as of April 2025 There was formerly a railway station but this closed in 1960.

There are two service areas called Sutton Scotney Services, one on the northbound and one on the southbound carriageway, on the village's A34 bypass.
