= Micheldever railway station =

Railway station in Hampshire, England

Coordinates: 51.182°N 1.261°W

Micheldever
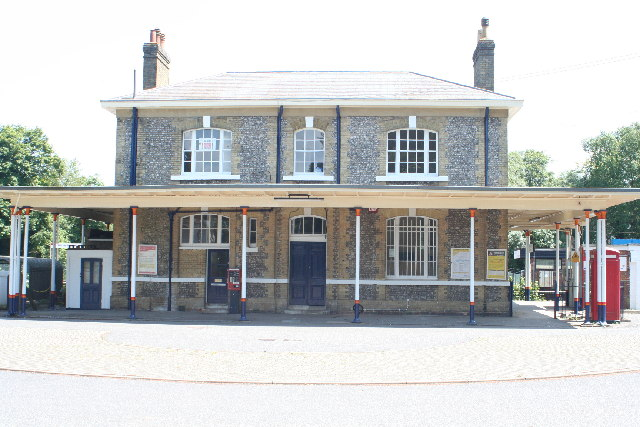

General information
- Location: Micheldever, City of Winchester; England
- Grid reference: SU517428
- Managed by: South Western Railway
- Platforms: 3 (2 in use)

Other information
- Station code: MIC
- Classification: DfT category E

Key dates
- 11 May 1840: Opened as Andover Road
- 1856: renamed Micheldever

Passengers
- 2020/21: ▼25,046
- 2021/22: ▲74,258
- 2022/23: ▲93,498
- 2023/24: ▲0.111 million
- 2024/25: ▲0.132 million
Location
Notes
- Passenger statistics from the Office of Rail and Road

Micheldever railway station, in the village of Micheldever Station, serves Micheldever (approximately 2 miles (3.2 km) to the south) and the surrounding area in Hampshire, England. It is a two-storey flint building with a canopy on all four sides. The station is on the South West Main Line, 58 miles 4 chains (93.4 km) down the line from London Waterloo towards Southampton, and is managed by South Western Railway.

== History ==
The station was originally named "Andover Road" until Andover got its own station. Following the construction of the station, a cluster of houses and small shops was built, creating the village known as Micheldever Station. No shops remain, though there is a tyre merchant and trailer supplier trading there and a pub opposite the station.

Just prior to electrification of the line in 1967, the track layout was changed: the two side platforms were replaced by an island platform between the tracks.

== Service patterns ==
Generally, a train leaves hourly in each direction. Trains towards London Waterloo call at Basingstoke, Farnborough (Main) (Mondays-Saturdays only), Woking (every day) and Clapham Junction (Sundays only). Trains towards Portsmouth Harbour call at Winchester, Eastleigh, Hedge End, Botley, Fareham, Portchester, Cosham, Hilsea, Fratton and Portsmouth & Southsea. On Sundays they call at Winchester, Shawford (every two hours) and Eastleigh, where the train divides: the front part runs to Poole, calling at Southampton Airport Parkway, Southampton Central, Totton, Ashurst New Forest, Beaulieu Road, Brockenhurst, Sway, New Milton, Hinton Admiral, Christchurch, Pokesdown and Bournemouth. The rear part of the train travels to Portsmouth as described above.

Preceding station	National Rail	Following station
Basingstoke	South Western Railway; South West Main Line	Winchester

== Goods yard ==
There is a 32 acres (13 ha) goods yard which served a Royal Air Force fuel and oil depot (part of the Government Pipelines and Storage System), built circa 1939 and closed circa 1995. The yard is still (2018) in use for rolling stock storage.

== Gallery ==
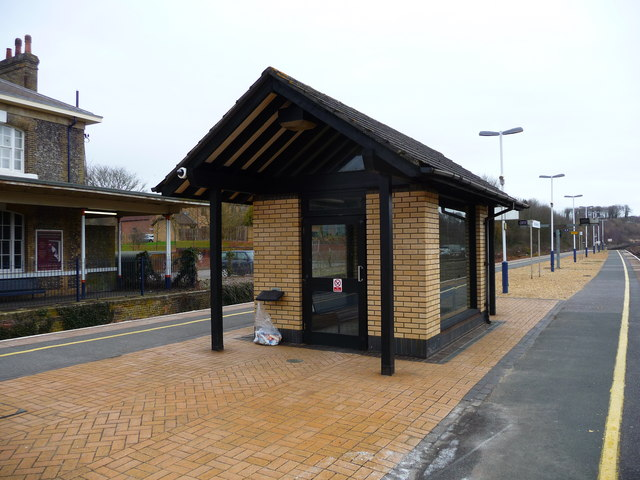
Waiting room and island platform, 2009

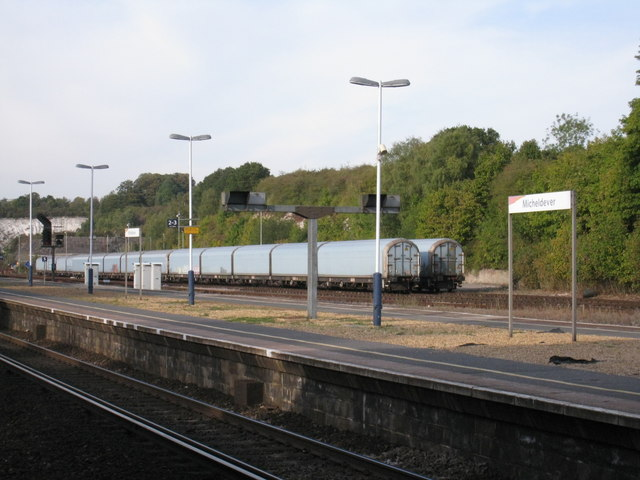
Wagons in the goods yard, 2009
