= Bullington, Hampshire =

Civil parish in the Test Valley district of Hampshire, England

Coordinates: 51.166667°N 1.333333°W

Bullington
- Location within Hampshire
- District: Test Valley
- Shire county: Hampshire
- Region: South East
- Country: England
- Sovereign state: United Kingdom
- Post town: WINCHESTER
- Postcode district: SO21
- Dialling code: 01962
- Police: Hampshire and Isle of Wight
- Fire: Hampshire and Isle of Wight
- Ambulance: South Central
- UK Parliament: Romsey and Southampton North

Bullington is a civil parish in the Test Valley district of Hampshire, England. The parish contains Upper Bullington and Lower Bullington, both about 9 miles (14 km) south-east of Andover. According to the 2001 census the parish had a population of 101.
