= West Stratton =

Village in Hampshire, England

Coordinates: 51.160298°N 1.244546°W

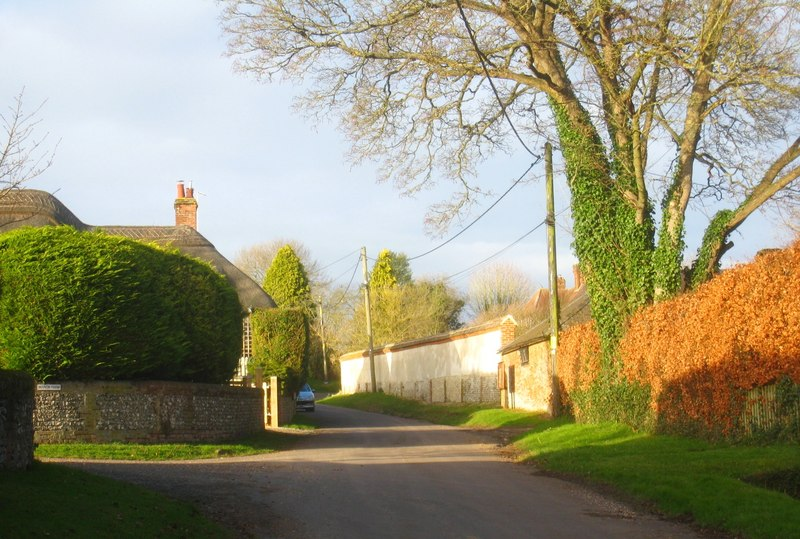

- Location within Hampshire
- OS grid reference: SU5292540387
- Civil parish: Micheldever
- District: City of Winchester
- Shire county: Hampshire
- Region: South East
- Country: England
- Sovereign state: United Kingdom
- Post town: WINCHESTER
- Postcode district: SO24
- Dialling code: 01962
- Police: Hampshire and Isle of Wight
- Fire: Hampshire and Isle of Wight
- Ambulance: South Central
- UK Parliament: Winchester

West Stratton is a village in the civil parish of Micheldever in the City of Winchester district of Hampshire, England. The village lies close to the M3, which has separated West Stratton from East Stratton. It is 2 kilometres (1.2 mi) north-east of Micheldever.
