= Western Weald =

Coordinates: 51.05°N 0.75°W

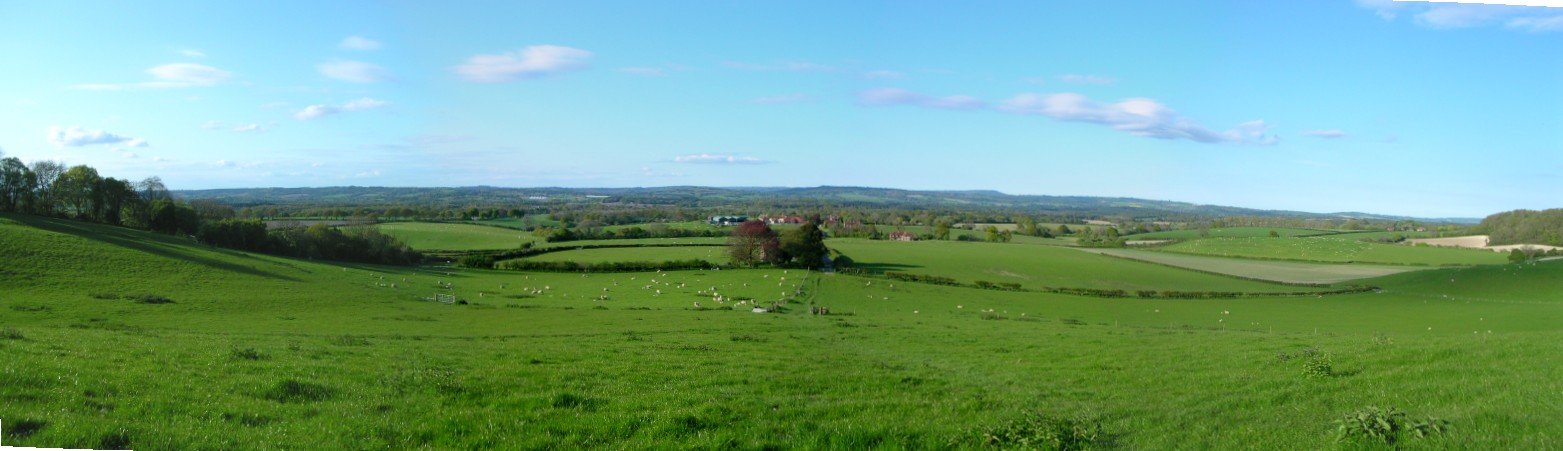
The Western Weald seen from Didling Hill

The western Weald is an area of undulating countryside in Hampshire and West Sussex containing a mixture of woodland and heathland areas.

It lies to the south of the towns of Bordon, Haslemere and Rake and to the west of the town of Pulborough. It includes the towns of Liss and Petersfield on its western boundary and the towns of Midhurst and Petworth to the south. Natural features include Blackdown, the highest point in Sussex, and Woolmer Forest in Hampshire. The chalk escarpment of the South Downs forms a prominent boundary to the south and west.

The western Weald forms part of the larger Weald. Geologically it consists of a mixture of sandstone and clay strata which have been exposed by the erosion of the Weald-Artois Anticline. The resulting soils include acid heathland and poorly draining clay soil which support deciduous, particularly oak, woodlands interspersed with small irregularly shaped fields, with many surviving medieval boundaries.

The western Weald came to prominence as the result of a protracted and sometimes heated dispute about whether or not the area should be included in the South Downs National Park. The original public inquiry into the proposal to create the national park concluded that it should be excluded, in large part because of its different geology from the chalky South Downs. However, following a second inquiry the government decided that the whole of the western Weald should be included, a decision which took effect when the new national park formally came into existence on 31 March 2010.

== West Weald Landscape Project ==
The West Weald Landscape Project refers to itself as "a visionary partnership project that promotes the integrated management of a viable and enhanced landscape in the West Weald for people and nature." The project covers an area of 240 square kilometres (93 sq mi) north of Petworth in the Chichester District of West Sussex and the borough of Waverley in Surrey. It is funded by a partnership of 15 organisations including environmental bodies and local authorities. The project seeks to conserve and enhance the special natural environment of the area, which it considers to be internationally important for the following reasons: it is one of the most wooded landscapes in Britain; it is a rare example of a more natural forest ecosystem; it is home to rare wildlife species; it has a historic living landscape dating back to before medieval times; and it is an island of tranquillity in south-east England. The project has four objectives:

- enhanced conservation of four core forest areas: Ebernoe, The Mens, Chiddingfold Forest, and the Greensand Woods;
- improved connections and sympathetic land management across the whole landscape;
- informed conservation from applied research, surveys and monitoring;
- increased enjoyment, understanding and involvement of the public.

== Landscape character ==
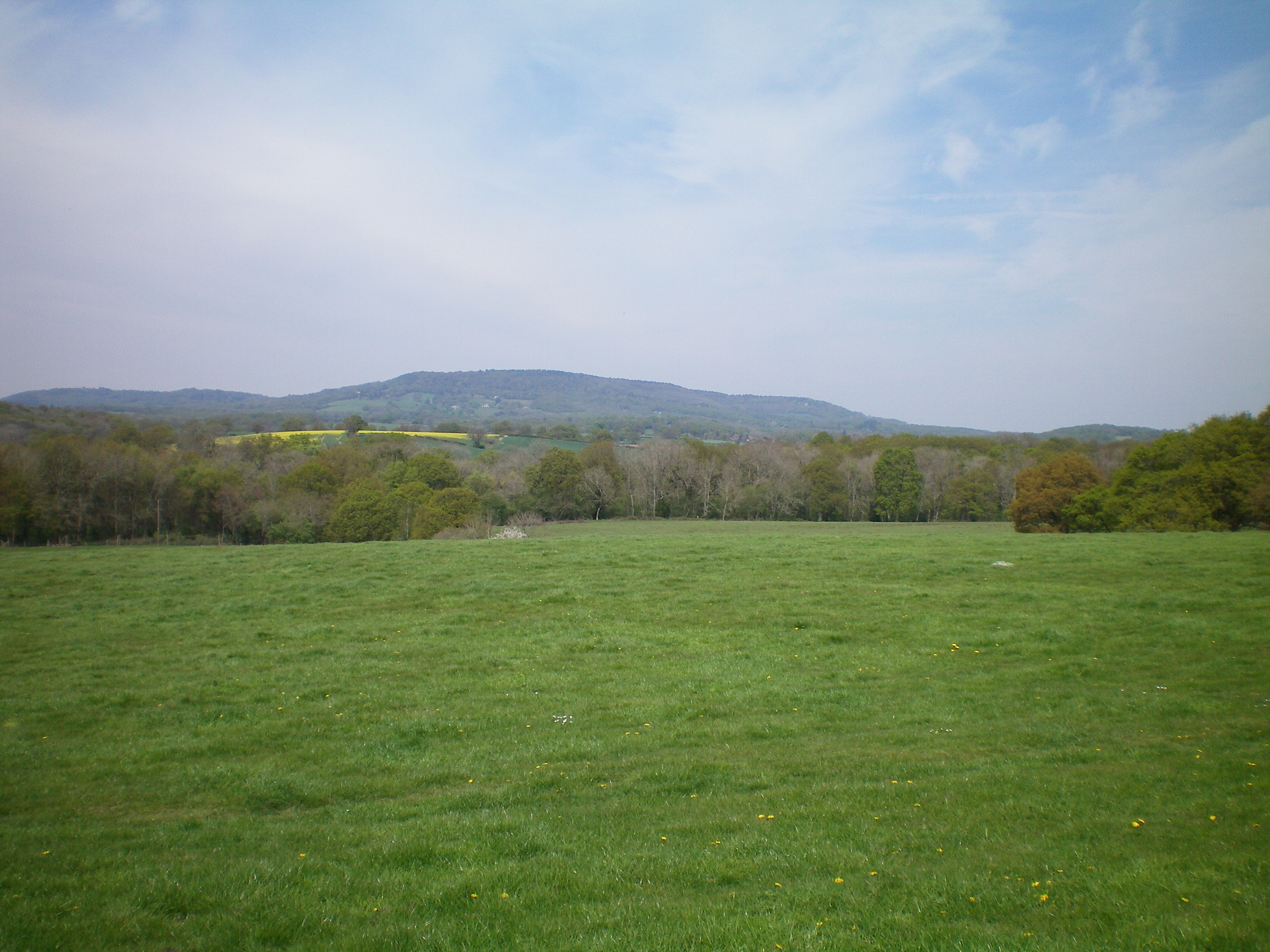
View across the western Weald to Blackdown (centre) and Marley Heights (left).

The western Weald comprises the Low Weald, a vale of Weald Clay, and the hills of the Greensand Ridge.

The Low Weald has an undulating, well-wooded character. A patchwork of farmland, woodland and commons, with many hedgerows, form a landscape which has changed little since the Middle Ages. Almost one third of the area is woodland, and two-thirds of that is ancient, including old growth forest at The Mens and wood-pasture at Ebernoe Common. The area has many man-made lakes and ponds, often created to power the Wealden iron industry or for water mills, although others were created for sporting purposes. The western Weald has been described as a rare example of a part-functioning forest ecosystem.

== Geology and soils ==
The predominant geology underlying the western Weald is the Weald Clay of the Wealden Series of the Lower Cretaceous, including in a few places Paludina limestones, used as a building stone. To the west there are extensive hills and ridges formed of Lower Greensand, including Blackdown, the highest point in Sussex. There are patches of drift overlying the clay and some river terrace gravels and alluvium in the river valleys. Beyond the Weald Clay a generally narrow band of Gault Clay outcrops to form the boundary between the Weald and the chalk downlands. At Alice Holt Forest, north of Woolmer Forest, a wide outcrop of this blue clay was exploited on an industrial scale for pottery production during the Roman era.

Six soil condition types have been identified by the National Soils Map, the most widespread being slowly permeable, seasonally wet, slightly acid but base-rich, loamy and clayey soils which have moderate natural fertility and impeded drainage. Where groundwater levels are high, a wet low fertility variant of the first type occurs. Very acid, free-draining soils with very low natural fertility occur over the Lower Greensand. Freely draining, slightly acid loamy soils are found along the Rother valley where they are used for intensive arable farming and vegetable growing. Freely draining, slightly acid sandy soils are found at Cowdray Park and around Hambledon. Wet loamy and clayey floodplain soils of moderate natural fertility are found along the River Arun, where they provide summer grazing for cattle.

== Water quality ==
The western Weald is drained by the Western Rother and its tributaries, notably the River Lod, and by the River Kird and Loxwood Stream, all of which are tributaries of the River Arun. Water quality is above average for south eastern England, with chemical water quality variable but biological quality good to exceptional in all of the rivers, according to the Environment Agency. Silt from intensive arable farming on silty erosion prone soils on the greensand is a problem in the Western Rother. The Environment Agency is working with farmers to control run off from fields, by using reduced cultivations with less ploughing, having grass margins at the foot of slopes and moving gateways away from the foot of slopes. Flow rates, which are measured for the River Lod and Loxwood Stream, vary greatly with rainfall on the impermeable clay, with a tendency to flash flooding, and this has increased over the last thirty years.

== Air quality ==
The low population density of the western Weald leads to gaseous pollution levels from fossil fuels being around half those of surrounding districts. Methane coming from ruminant animals and nitrous oxide from soils mean there is less difference regarding these gases.

== Noise and light pollution ==
Low population density for south east England and the absence of trunk roads contribute to low noise levels in the area South east England has the most light polluted skies in Britain, especially in Greater London, with only about 1% truly dark sky. The Western Weald has some of the darkest skies in the region, with 3% of West Sussex being in the darkest category and 11% in the next darkest in 2000, all of it in the western weald. Between 1993 and 2000 the overall situation deteriorated but the darkest areas actually increased in parts of the western weald. As well as obscuring the starry sky light pollution is claimed to detrimentally affect foraging behaviour of bats, frogs and moths, the migration of birds and singing by song birds.

== Biodiversity ==
The range of habitats, broken topography and small field sizes in the Western Weald support a wide range of species. The large fragments of ancient woodland, heathlands and wet meadows are of special conservation value. Buzzards have been breeding in the area for a number of years, but red kites have not yet colonised the area. At least 4,400 species have been recorded, including many priority species for conservation, including 95 listed under the UK Biodiversity Action Plan.

Ebernoe Common is a national nature reserve and Site of Special Scientific Interest. Managed by the Sussex Wildlife Trust, it includes ancient woodland, glades and ponds, and supports a diversity of plants and animals, including 14 out of 16 species of bat which occur in the UK, including the rare Bechstein's and Barbastelle bats. Adjoining farmland has been purchased with a grant from Restore UK which will be allowed to revert to pasture woodland over a long period with managed grazing by cattle. The Barbastelle bats need old dying trees with loose bark for their roosts and travel great distances along traditional flight lines to feed over damp meadows, which may be as much as 20 kilometres from the roost, in the Arun and Rother valleys. Local landowners are being encouraged to maintain and enhance continuous tree cover along these routes so that the bats can travel out on summer evenings, avoiding predation by sparrow hawks.

== Public access ==
There are substantial areas of open access land on commons across the area and extensive footpath and bridleway networks. The Serpent Trail long distance path between Petersfield and Haslemere is designed to pass through most of the heathlands in the area, passing from Haslemere west to Rake, West Sussex then east to Fittleworth, north of the River Rother, and then westwards again, south of the river, to Petersfield. The A272 road is the only major road across the Western Weald, and is nearly all single carriageway, while the A283 and A286 roads provide north–south access. Local roads tend to be narrow and winding.

== South Downs National Park ==
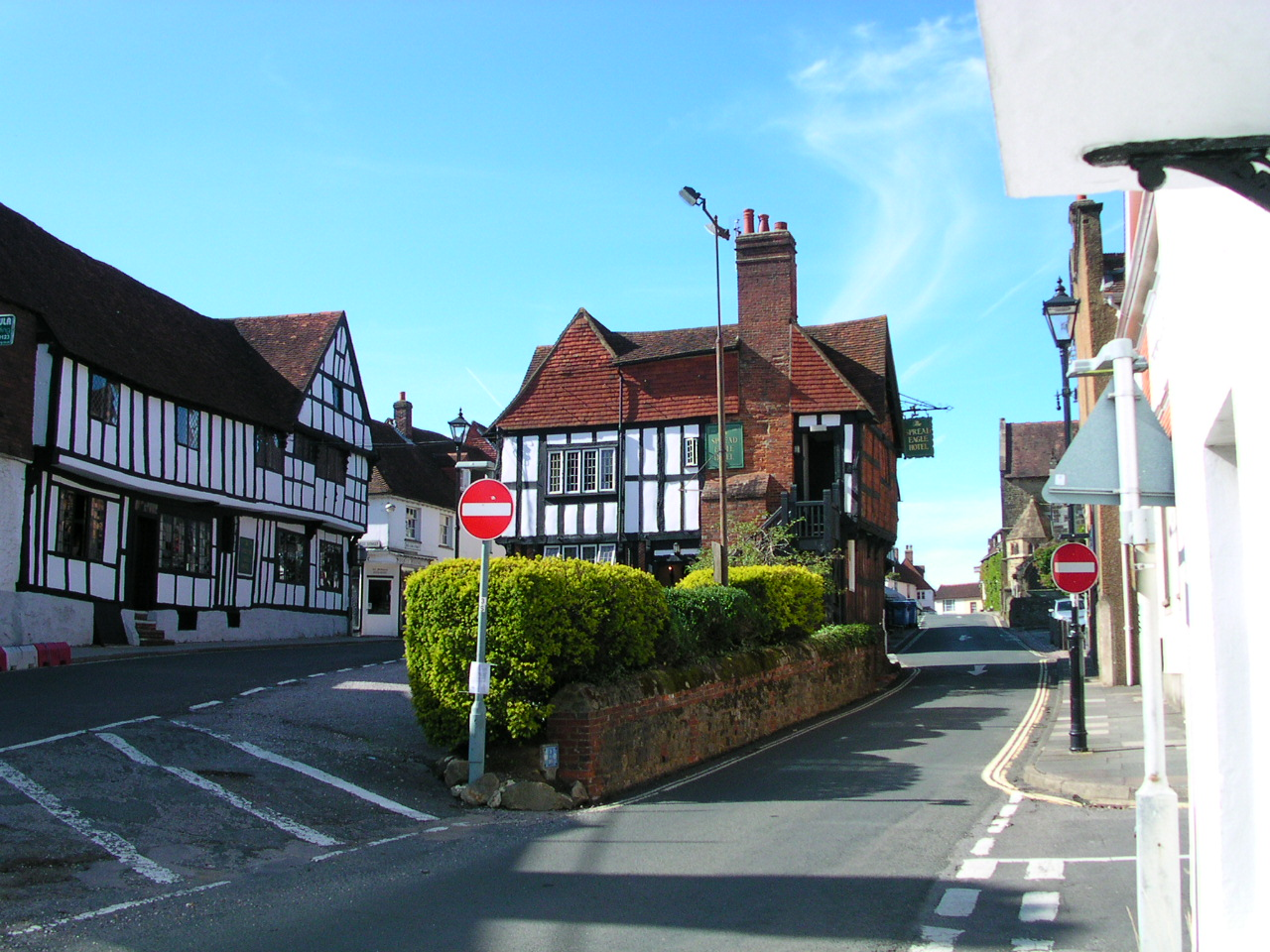
The historic market town of Midhurst, now to be included in the national park.

The inclusion of the western Weald in the South Downs National Park was a matter of great controversy. The report on the original public inquiry into the creation of the national park, which was published on 31 March 2006, concluded that its boundaries should be confined to the chalk downs, and thus exclude the wealden area of East Hampshire and the Chichester District of West Sussex. The inspector claimed new housing developments and intensive agriculture had degraded the Rother Valley so that it was unsuitable to be included. Seasonal use of plastic film on intensive vegetable crops along the fertile valley has a strong visual impact.

This conclusion was disputed by a number of organisations, including Natural England, the Ramblers' Association, Sussex Wildlife Trust and the Campaign for National Parks who pointed to the diverse geology of existing national parks such as the Lake District and Peak District. The Campaign to Protect Rural England, which had been campaigning for a South Downs national park since 1929, vigorously supported inclusion of the western Weald. Its president, Bill Bryson, claimed that failure to include the area would be a "national tragedy".

Critics of the decision countered that there had been only limited new housing, and the area had been an AONB for forty years, showing that it did not need the greater protection of being in a national park. After much public outcry and petitioning of government it was decided to re-open the public inquiry to take new submissions regarding the western Weald and a number of other disputed areas; the inquiry re-opened on 12 February 2008 and closed on 4 July 2008 after 27 sitting days. On 31 March 2009 the result of the inquiry was published. The government announced that the South Downs would be designated a national park, and that the western Weald would be included within it.

Until the creation of the national park, the western Weald had been protected by two Areas of Outstanding Natural Beauty, the East Hampshire AONB and the Sussex Downs AONB, both administered by the South Downs Joint Committee; these areas remained in existence until 31 March 2010, when the South Downs National Park formally came into being.

=== Local authority positions ===
West Sussex County Council, which had consistently opposed the creation of any national park for the South Downs, sought at least to restrict the park boundary to the chalk escarpment of the South Downs, arguing that existing AONB designations gave the western Weald an equal level of protection. The leader of the council told the re-opened South Downs National Park inquiry that "there continues to be no support for inclusion of the Wealden area in the South Downs National Park", though this claim came only two weeks after a meeting with a number of parish and town councils from that area who had expressed strong support for its inclusion in the national park. Chichester District Council also expressed opposition to the creation of the national park, which was to cover two-thirds of its area, and to the inclusion of the western Weald. By contrast, Hampshire County Council and East Hampshire District Council, together with all the parish councils in the Hampshire part of the western Weald, took a positive view of the proposed park and welcomed the public enquiry inspector's decision in favour.
