= Asham =

Asham may refer to:

- Asham (dessert), Caribbean corn-based dessert
- Asham Quarry, geological site in East Sussex, England
- Asham Wood, biological site in Somerset, England
- Arron Asham (born 1978), Canadian ice hockey right winger
- Guilt offering (Hebrew: asham), a type of Biblical sacrifice

== See also ==
- Ash-Shām, the area known as Greater Syria, synonymous with (or part of) the Levant
