= South Downs National Park =

National park in South East England

- IUCN category V (protected landscape/seascape)
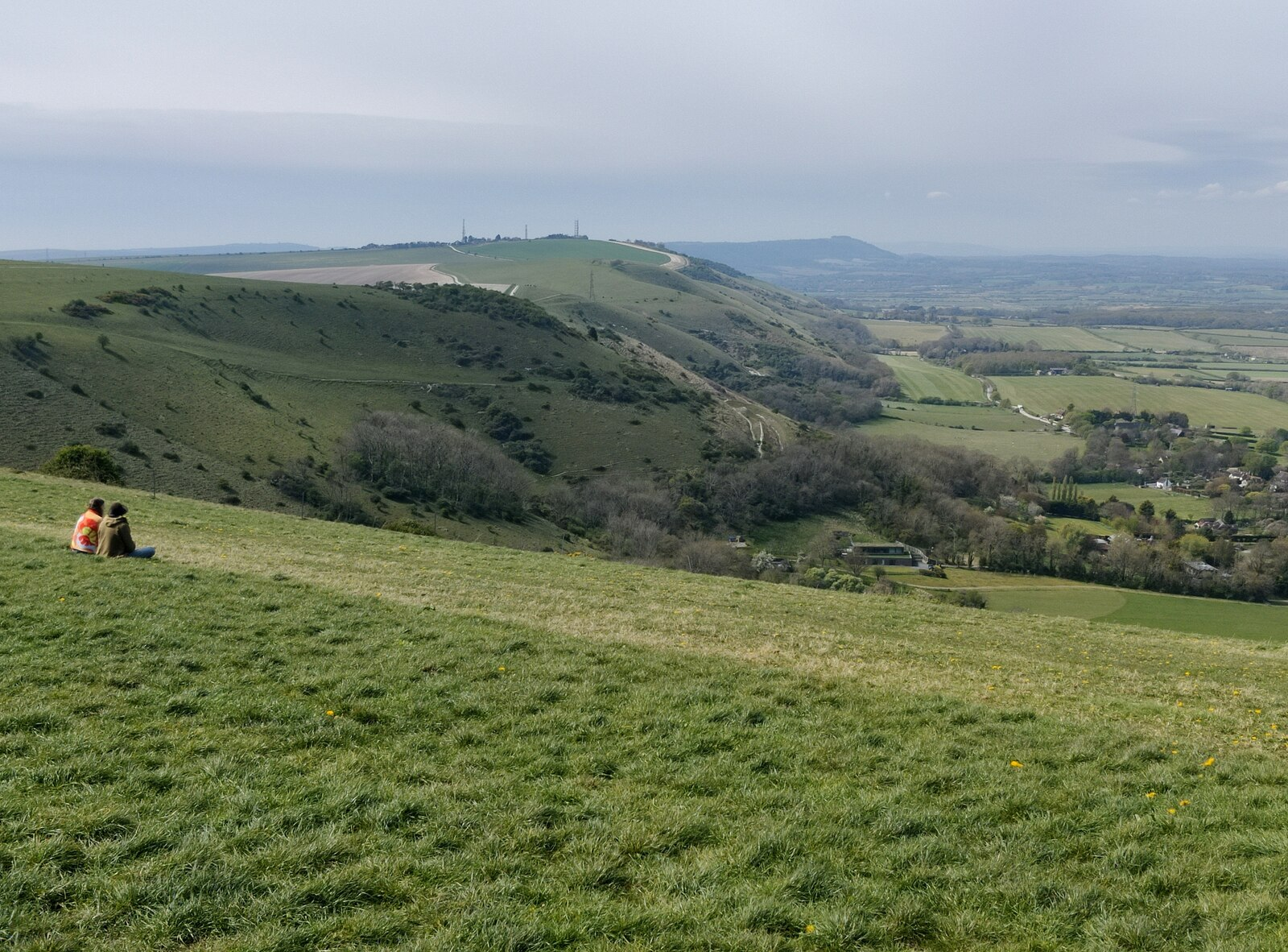
- View of the South Downs from Devil's Dyke

- Map of the South Downs National Park
- Location: United Kingdom (South East England)
- Coordinates: 50.911°N 0.367°W
- Length: 140 km (87 mi)
- Width: 11.2 km (7.0 mi)
- Area: 1,627 km^{2} (628 sq mi)
- Established: 1 April 2010
- Visitors: 18 million (in 2024)
- Governing body: South Downs National Park Authority
- Website: www.southdowns.gov.uk

The South Downs National Park is England's newest national park, designated on 31 March 2010. The park, covering an area of 1,627 square kilometres (628 sq mi) in southern England, stretches for 140 kilometres (87 mi) from Winchester in the west to Eastbourne in the east, through the counties of Hampshire, West Sussex and East Sussex. The national park covers the chalk hills of the South Downs (which on the English Channel coast form the white cliffs of the Seven Sisters and Beachy Head) and a substantial part of a separate physiographic region, the western Weald, with its heavily wooded sandstone and clay hills and vales. The South Downs Way spans the entire length of the park and is the only National Trail that lies wholly within a national park.

== History ==
The idea of a South Downs National Park originated in the 1920s, when public concern was mounting about increasing threats to the beauty of the downland environment, particularly the impact of indiscriminate speculative housing development on the eastern Sussex Downs (Peacehaven was an example of this). In 1929, the Council for the Preservation of Rural England, led by campaigners including the geographer Vaughan Cornish, submitted a memorandum to the Prime Minister urging the case for national parks, including a national park on part of the South Downs. When however, towards the end of World War II, John Dower was asked to report on how a system of national parks in England and Wales might be established, his 1945 report, National Parks in England and Wales, did not identify the South Downs for national park status, but rather included it in a list of "other amenity areas". Sir Arthur Hobhouse's 1947 Report of the National Parks Committee took a different view, and he included the South Downs in his list of twelve areas recommended for designation as a national park, defined by John Dower as an "extensive area of beautiful and relatively wild country in which, for the nation's benefit...the characteristic landscape beauty is strictly preserved".

The South Downs was the last of the original twelve recommended national parks to be designated. Extensive damage to the chalk downland from 1940 onwards through arable farming, and a resulting decline in sheep grazing, militated at an early stage against further work on designation. When in 1956 the National Parks Commission came to consider the case for the South Downs as a national park, it found designation no longer appropriate, noting that the value of the South Downs as a potential national park had been reduced by cultivation. It did however recognise the "great natural beauty" of the area, and proposed it be designated as an Area of Outstanding Natural Beauty. In due course two AONBs were designated, split along the county boundary, namely the East Hampshire AONB in 1962 and the Sussex Downs AONB in 1966. These were later to form the basis of the South Downs National Park.

In September 1999, the government, following a review of national parks policy, declared support for a South Downs National Park and announced a consultation on its creation. In January 2003 the then Countryside Agency (now Natural England) made an Order to designate the proposed park in 2003 which was submitted to the Secretary of State for the Environment on 27 January 2003.

As a result of objections and representations received on the proposed Order, a public inquiry was conducted between 10 November 2003 and 23 March 2005, with the aim of recommending to ministers whether a national park should be confirmed and, if so, where its boundaries should be. The results of the inquiry were expected by the end of 2005, but were delayed pending a legal issue arising from a High Court case challenging part of the Order designating the New Forest National Park.

Following an appeal on the High Court case and new legislation included in the Natural Environment and Rural Communities Act 2006, the South Downs Inquiry report was published on 31 March 2006. It recommended a 23% reduction in the size of the originally proposed national park, focussing it more narrowly on the chalk downland and excluding from it a large part of the existing East Hampshire and Sussex Downs AONBs. This proved controversial, leading to calls from the Campaign for the Protection of Rural England and others for the inclusion of the so-called western Weald, a region within the two AONBs possessing a geology, ecology and landscape quite different from the chalk hills of the South Downs, within the park boundary to ensure that it remained protected from development. The Secretary of State invited objections and representations on new issues relating to the proposed national park in a consultation that ran from 2 July to 13 August 2007. In the light of the responses received, the Secretary of State decided that it was appropriate to re-open the 2003–05 public inquiry. The inquiry re-opened on 12 February 2008 and was closed on 4 July 2008 after 27 sitting days. The Inspector's report was submitted on 28 November 2008.

On 31 March 2009, the result of the inquiry was published. The Secretary of State, Hilary Benn, announced that the South Downs would be designated a national park, and on 12 November 2009 he signed the order confirming the designation. He confirmed that a number of disputed areas – including the western Weald, the town of Lewes and the village of Ditchling – would be included within the national park.

Sussex Downs Conservation Board was an English local government organisation based in East and West Sussex to promote and manage the Sussex Downs Area of Outstanding Natural Beauty. In March 2010 the status of the AONB was revoked and the management of the Sussex Downs AONB was merged with the East Hampshire AONB under the South Downs Joint Committee pending the formation of a national park authority.

The new national park came into full operation on 1 April 2011 when the new South Downs National Park Authority assumed statutory responsibility for it. The occasion was marked by an opening ceremony which took place in the market square of Petersfield, a town in the western Weald just 4 km (2.5 mi) north of the chalk escarpment of the South Downs.

In 2016 the national park was granted International Dark Sky Reserve status, to restrict artificial light pollution above the park. It was the second such area in England and the 11th in the world.

== Administration ==
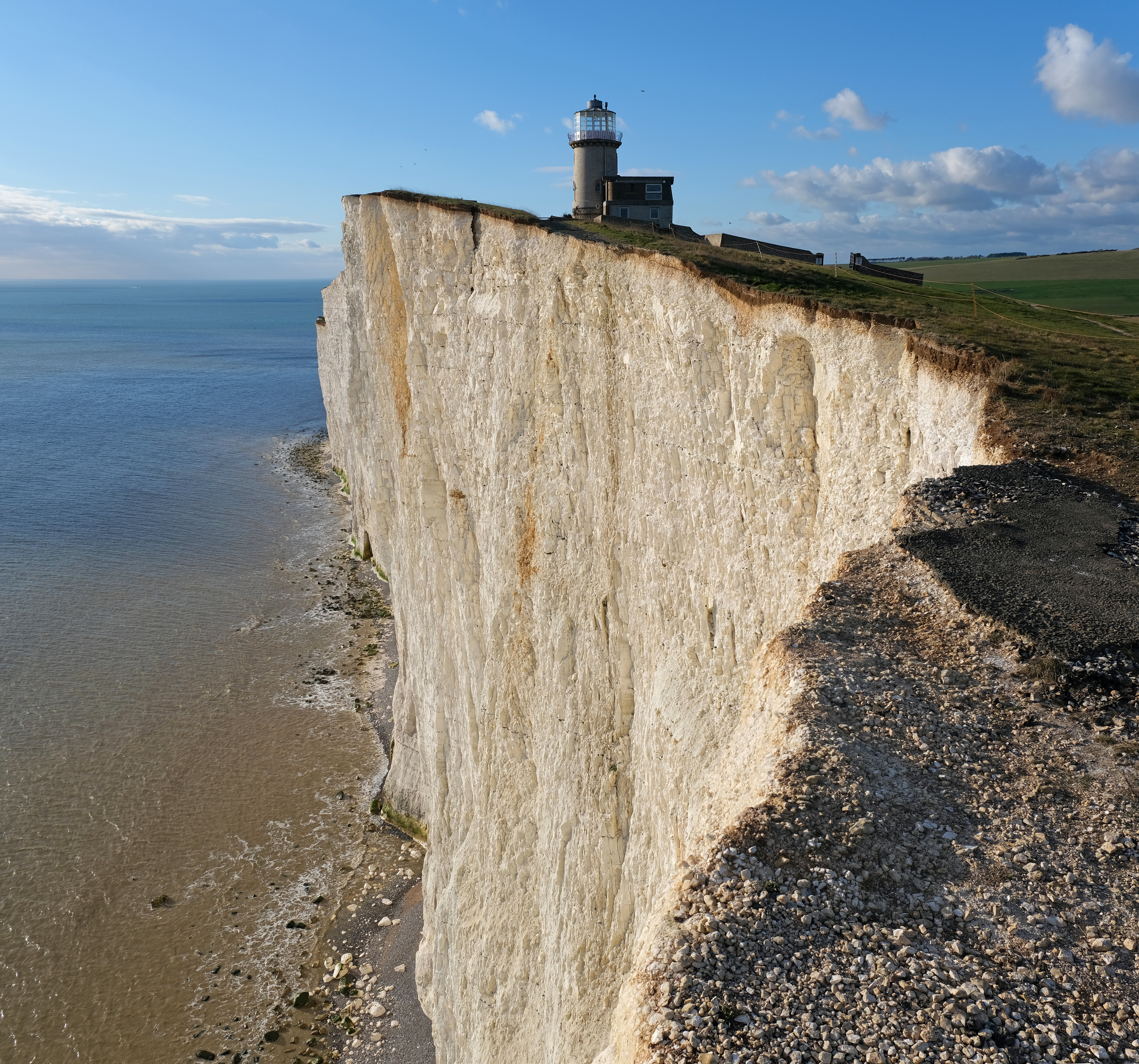
The headland of Beachy Head lies within the national park, seen here with the Belle Tout Lighthouse.

The national park is administered by the South Downs National Park Authority (SDNPA). The body was established on 1 April 2010, and became fully functioning, including becoming the planning authority for the national park, on 1 April 2011. It is responsible for promoting the statutory purposes of the national park and the interests of the people who live and work within it. The statutory purposes of the SDNPA, as a national park authority, are specified by the Environment Act 1995; these are:

- To conserve and enhance the natural beauty, wildlife and cultural heritage of the area
- To promote opportunities for the understanding and enjoyment of the Park's special qualities by the public.

It must also fulfil the following duty:

- In carrying out its role, the authority has a duty to seek to foster the economic and social well-being of the communities living within the national park.

The SDNPA is a public body, funded by central government, and run by a board of 27 members. The board consists of seven national members, appointed by the environment secretary by means of an open recruitment process; fourteen local authority nominees drawn from the fifteen local authorities covering the park area (with Adur and Worthing opting to share a place); and six parish council representatives, two for each county.

As at June 2024, the chair of SDNPA is Vanessa Rowlands, and the chief executive (interim) is Tim Slaney.

== Geography ==
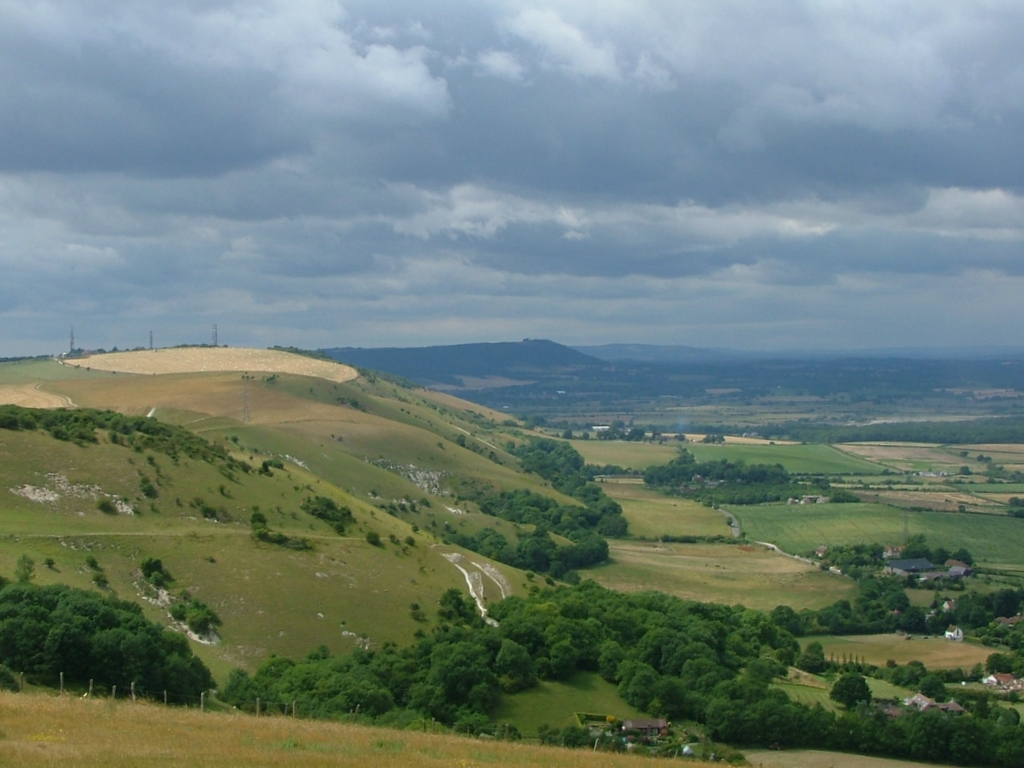
A view west from Devil's Dyke valley

The South Downs National Park stretches for 140 km (87 mi) across southern England from St Catherine's Hill near Winchester in Hampshire in the west to Beachy Head, near Eastbourne in East Sussex in the east. In its western half, the southern boundary of the park lies up to 10 km (6.2 mi) inland from the south coast; it thus excludes the major coastal towns and cities of Southampton, Portsmouth, Chichester, Bognor Regis and Littlehampton. Further east, where the park's southern boundary lies much closer to the coast, it has been carefully drawn to exclude the urban areas of Worthing, Brighton and Hove, Newhaven, Seaford and Eastbourne, which had all made substantial encroachments onto the Downs during the 19th and 20th centuries. By contrast, the park includes a number of settlements in the western Weald, including Petersfield, Liss, Midhurst and Petworth, and the two historic Sussex towns of Arundel and Lewes.

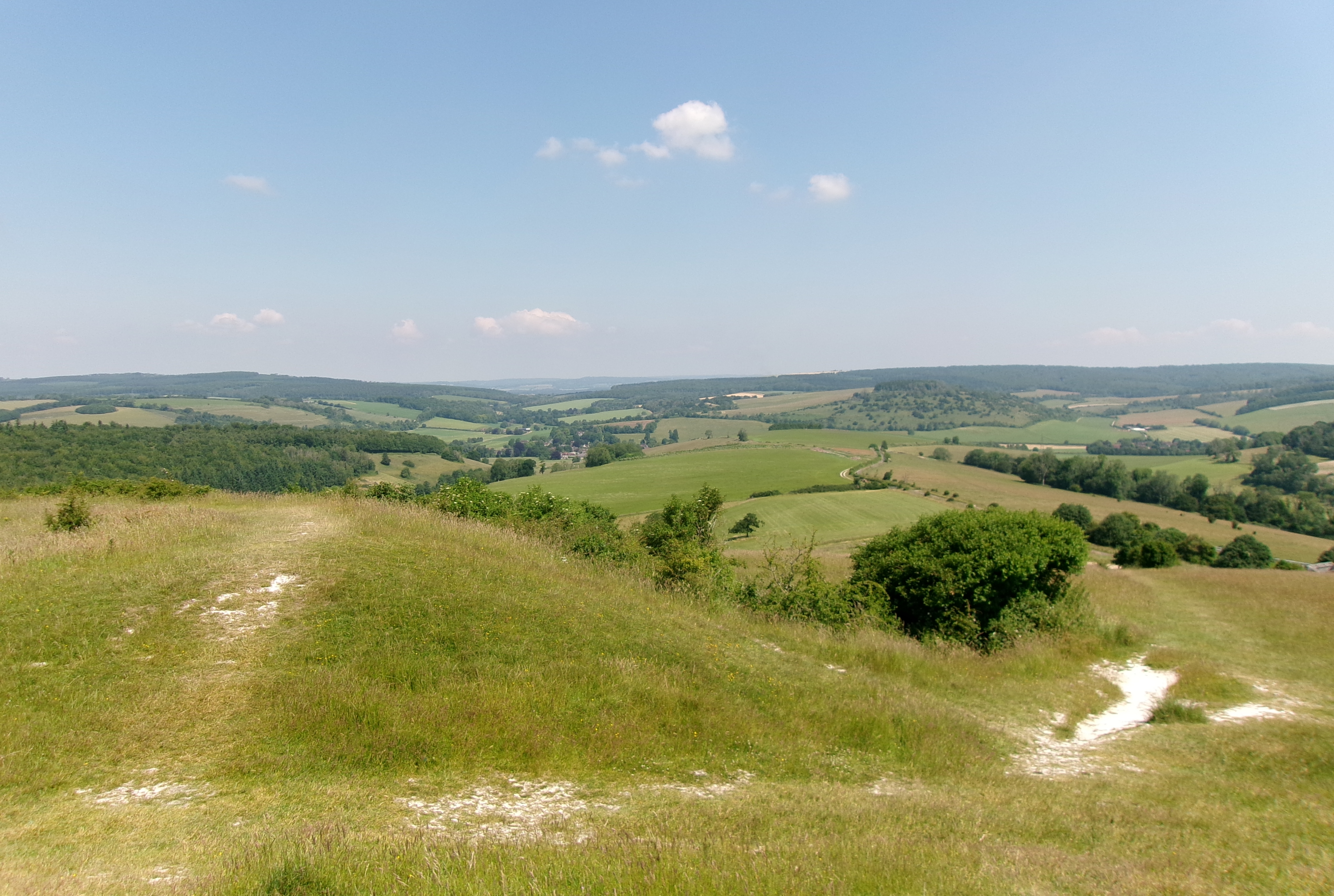
View north from St Roche's Hill, West Sussex

The population living within the national park is approximately 108,000. Of these 42,000 live in Hampshire, 40,000 in West Sussex and 25,000 in East Sussex. East Hampshire District Council area and Chichester District each have around 30,000 residents in the area, and Lewes District 22,000. Winchester has 11,500 residents in the park, with much smaller numbers for the other districts and boroughs. In 2024, the park authority stated that it received around 18 million visitors each year.

The national park has an area of 1,625 km^{2} (627 sq mi), of which 544 km^{2} (210 sq mi) is in Hampshire, 807 km^{2} (312 sq mi) in West Sussex and 237 km^{2} (92 sq mi) in East Sussex. Among the district council areas, Chichester District has the largest area at 544 km^{2} (210 sq mi), followed by East Hampshire District with 279 km^{2} (108 sq mi), Winchester with 265 km^{2} (102 sq mi), Lewes District with 159 km^{2} (61 sq mi) and Arun 102 km^{2} (39 sq mi). 93 km^{2} (36 sq mi) are in Horsham District and 60 km^{2} (23 sq mi) in Wealden District.

Apart from a number of boundary revisions, the park incorporates two areas previously designated as Areas of Outstanding Natural Beauty, the East Hampshire AONB and Sussex Downs AONB. The park also includes the Queen Elizabeth Country Park near Petersfield. The park contains 86 national Sites of Special Scientific Interest (SSSIs) and 13 international Special Areas of Conservation. A comprehensive review of tick populations in the park was reported in 2024, on data gathered in 2015 and 2016.

The South Downs National Park's chalk downland sets it apart from other national parks in Britain. However, almost a quarter (23%) of the national park consists of a quite different and strongly contrasting physiographic region, the western Weald, whose densely wooded hills and vales are based on an older Wealden geology of resistant sandstones and softer clays. The highest point in the national park, Blackdown, at 280 m (919 ft) above sea level, is within the Weald, on the Greensand Ridge, whereas the highest point on the chalk escarpment of the South Downs, Butser Hill, has an elevation of 271 m (889 ft) above sea level.

Within the national park there are two chalk hill figures, the Litlington White Horse and the Long Man of Wilmington.

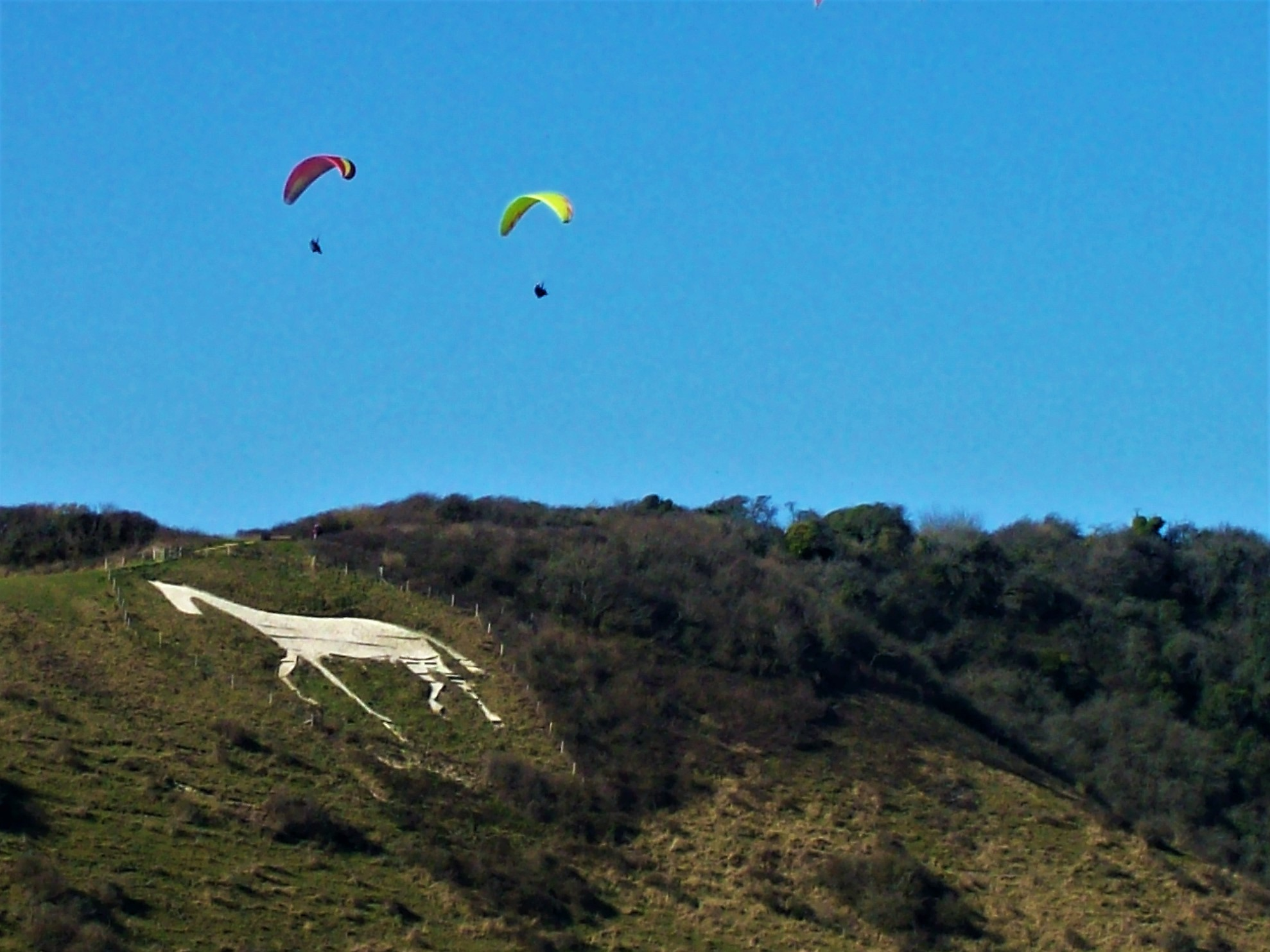
The Litlington White Horse

== Geology ==
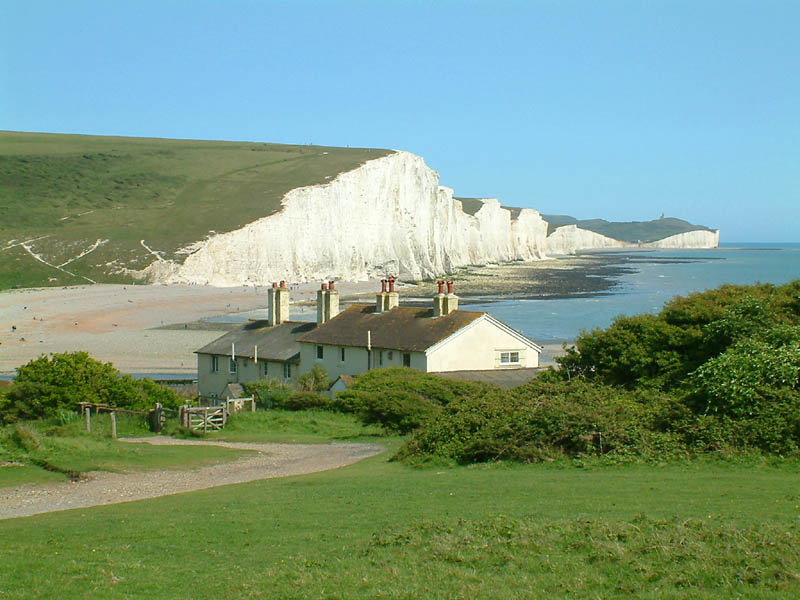
The Seven Sisters cliffs and the coastguard cottages, from Seaford Head across the mouth of the River Cuckmere

Most of the national park consists of chalk downland, although a significant part consists of the sandstones and clays of the western Weald, a strongly contrasting and distinctive landscape of densely wooded hills and vales.

The chalk was formed in the Late Cretaceous epoch, between 100 million and 66 million years ago, when the area was under the sea. During the Cenozoic era the chalk was uplifted as part of the Weald uplift which created the great Weald–Artois Anticline, caused by the same orogenic movements that created the Alps. The relatively resistant chalk rock has, through weathering, resulted in a classic cuesta landform, with a northward-facing chalk escarpment that rises dramatically above the low-lying vales of the Low Weald.

The chalk escarpment reaches the English Channel west of Eastbourne, where it forms the dramatic white cliffs of Beachy Head, the Seven Sisters and Seaford Head. These cliffs were formed after the end of the last ice age, when sea levels rose and the English Channel was formed, resulting in under-cutting of the chalk by the sea.

The South Downs run linearly west-north-westwards from the Eastbourne area through southern Sussex to the Hampshire downs, separating the south coastal plain from the clays and sandstones of the Weald. Behind the escarpment, on the dip slope, are the characteristic high, smooth, rolling downland hills interrupted by dry valleys and wind gaps, and the major river gaps of the Cuckmere, Ouse, Adur and Arun.

The chalk is a white sedimentary rock, notably homogeneous and fine-grained, and very permeable. It consists of minute calcite plates (coccoliths) shed from micro-organisms called coccolithophores. The strata include numerous layers of flint nodules, which have been widely exploited as a material for manufacture of stone tools as well as a building material for dwellings. Similar areas in Britain include the North Downs and the Chilterns.

In its western section, the national park extends north beyond the chalk escarpment of the South Downs into a quite different and strongly contrasting physiographic region, the western Weald, taking in the valley of the western River Rother, incised into Lower Greensand bedrock, and the densely wooded hills and valleys of the Greensand Ridge and Weald Clay south of Haslemere.

== See also ==
- Wiston House
- Butser Ancient Farm
