= Asham (dessert) =

Caribbean corn-based dessert

- Type: Dessert Snack
- Place of origin: Caribbean
- Main ingredients: Corn, sugar or salt

Asham is a corn-based Caribbean dessert. It is thought to have originated in Africa, with the name asham derived from the Akan word o-sĭám meaning "parched and ground corn". Other names include Brown George (Jamaica), asham (Grenada), ashum (Antigua), sansam and chilli bibi (Trinidad), caan sham, casham and kasham (Belize).

It is made by shelling dry corn, parching it, and then grinding it finely. Salt or sugar can then be added to the mixture and it can be eaten dry or with water.

== See also ==
- Cocktion
- Duckunoo
- List of desserts
