= Serpent Trail =

64-mile footpath in southern England

Coordinates: 51.092°N 0.711°W

The Serpent Trail
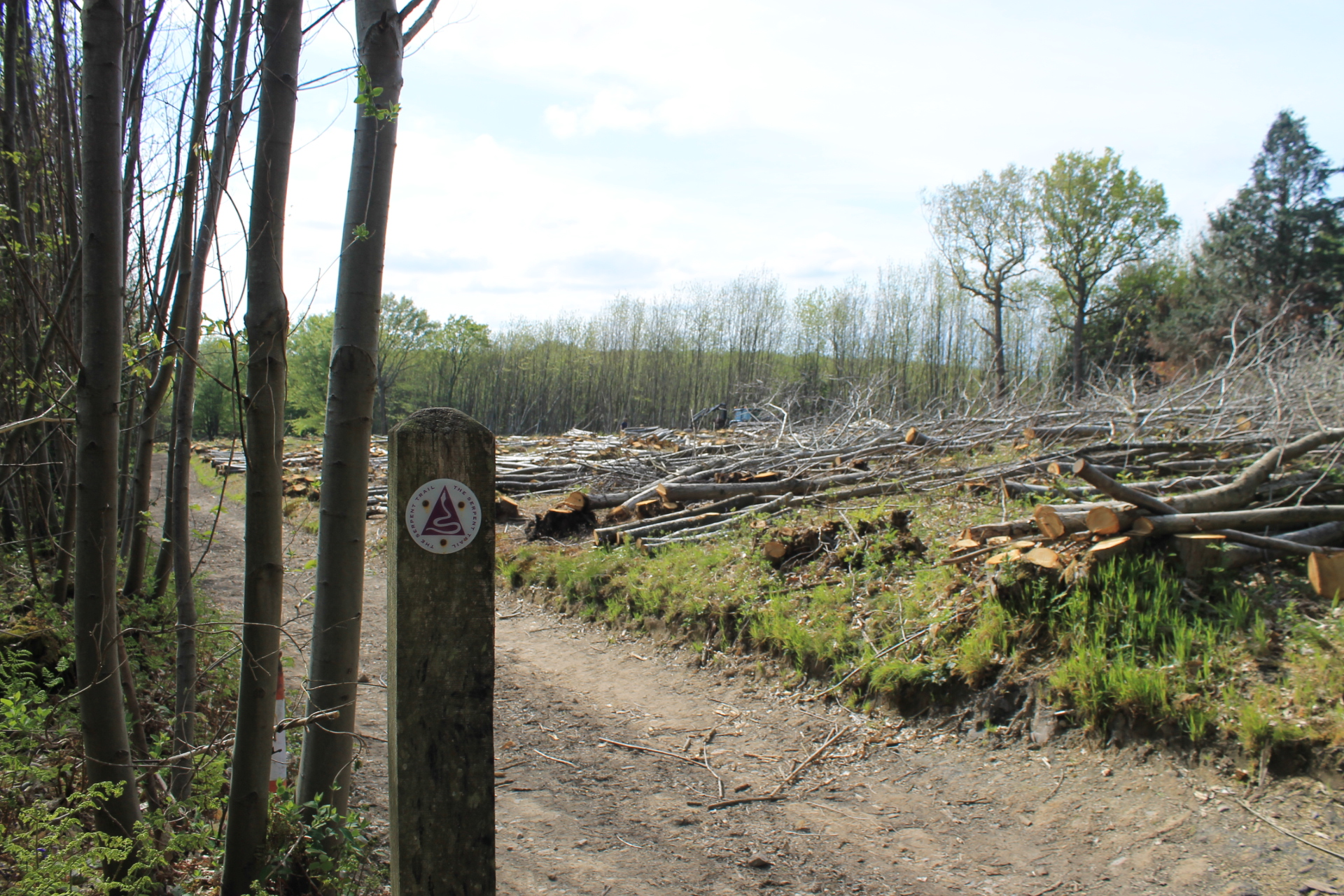
- The Serpent Trail passing through chestnut coppice near Petworth, May 2015
- Length: 64 mi (103 km)
- Location: Hampshire, Surrey and West Sussex, England
- Trailheads: Haslemere - Petersfield
- Use: Hiking
- Highest point: Blackdown, 280 m (920 ft)
- Lowest point: The River Rother at Fittleworth, 6 m (20 ft)
- Season: All year

The Serpent Trail is a 64-mile (103 km) long distance footpath. It runs from Haslemere to Petersfield, which are 11 miles apart in a straight line, by a route which is designed to join up the many heathland areas on greensand in the western Weald. The path takes its name both from its serpentine shape and from passing through habitat of all three British species of snake (adder, grass snake and smooth snake).

== The route ==
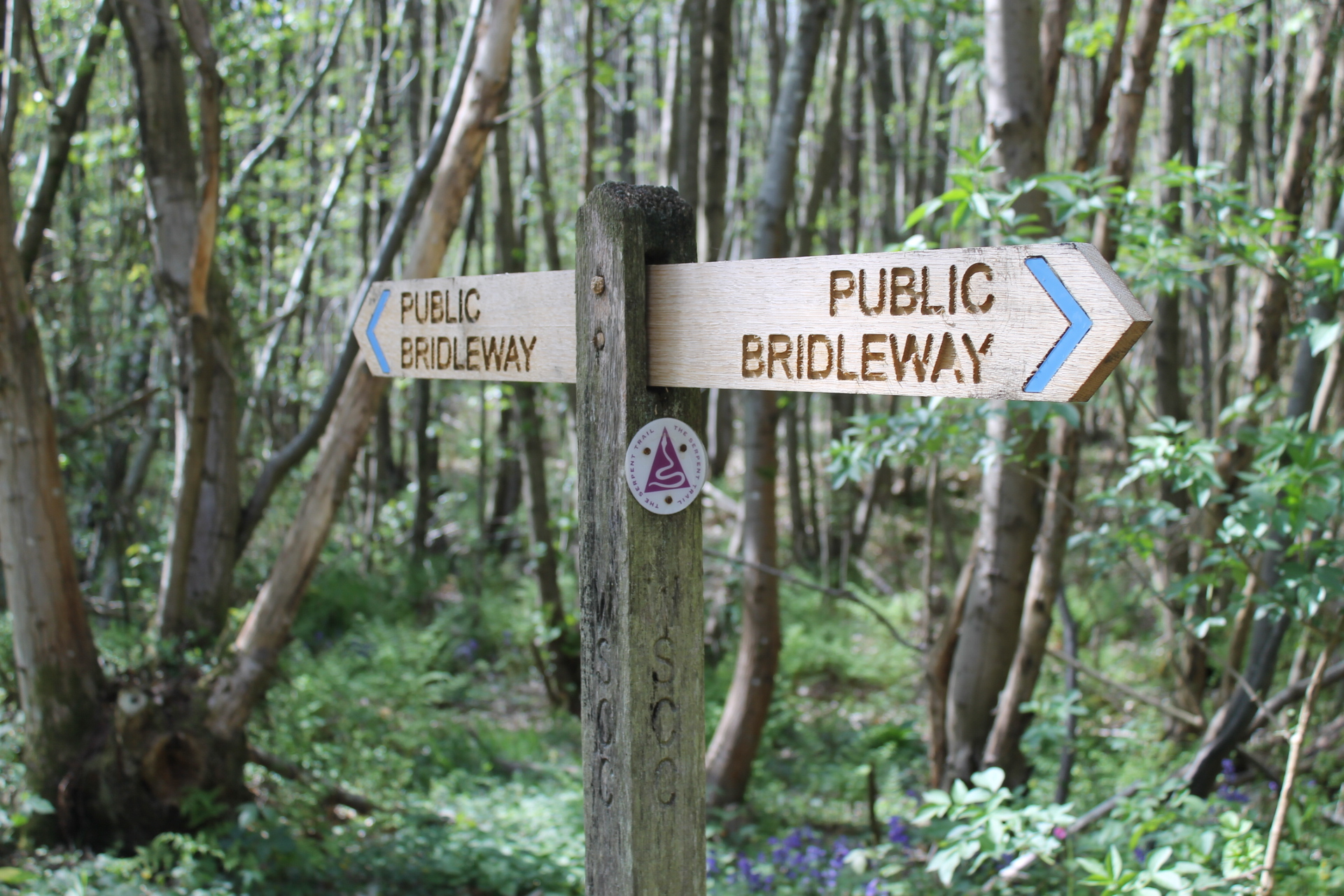
A fingerpost on the Serpent Trail, May 2015

From Haslemere High Street the trail goes south to Blackdown, then westward through Marley Common, Linchmere Common, Stanley Common and Chapel Common to Rake. South of Rake the trail turns east, heading over Fyning Hill to Iping Marsh, Woolbeding Common, Henley Common, Bexley Hill and Leggatt Hill to Upperton Common. From Upperton to Petworth the official route follows the public road, but many walkers may prefer to cross Petworth Park, which can be entered down some steps by the southernmost house in Upperton. A tunnel on the northern side of Petworth House leads into the town, as do the lodge gates south of the house. From the east side of Petworth the trail crosses the Shimmings valley and climbs the sandstone ridge, passing through Flexham Park to Bedham, where it turns southward in a gentle descent to Fittleworth passing, at its easternmost part, close to Brinkwells, the former home of composer Sir Edward Elgar.

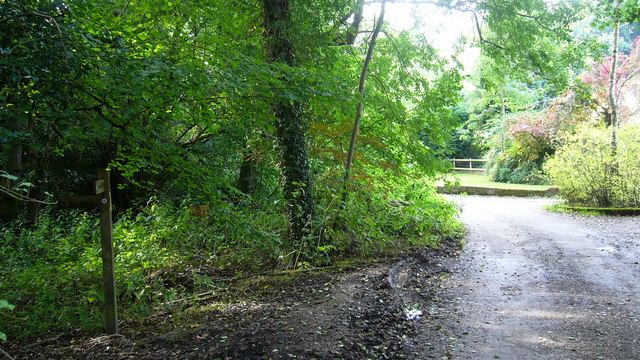
A concurrency with the Sussex Border Path along the Serpent Trail, September 2008

From Lower Fittleworth the trail crosses the River Rother and follows the greensand stratum that lies between the river and the South Downs escarpment, passing through Sutton Common, Burton Park, Duncton Common, Lavington Common, Graffham Common and Heyshott Common to Cocking Causeway. Crossing the A286 the trail skirts the west side of Midhurst to Midhurst Common and passes through Stedham Common, Iping Common and Trotton Common to Dumpford. The trail continues along Dumpford Lane to Nyewood, then crosses farmland to West Heath Common, reaching the A272 road at Durleighmarsh, then passing the site of Durford Abbey to Heath Common at Petersfield, ending at Heath Pond.

== Way markers ==
The trail is waymarked with white plastic discs showing a snake in the approximate shape of the route on a purple triangle.
