= Asham Quarry =

Protected area in East Sussex, England

Coordinates: 50.834°N 0.045°E

- Site of Special Scientific Interest
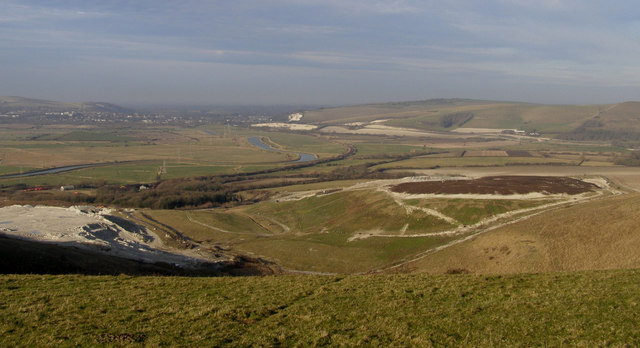
- Location of Asham Quarry.
- Area of search: East Sussex
- Grid reference: TQ 441 058
- Interest: Geological
- Area: 2.6 hectares (6.4 acres)
- Notification date: 1999
- Location map: Magic Map

Asham Quarry is a 2.6-hectare (6.4-acre) geological Site of Special Scientific Interest north of Newhaven in East Sussex. It is a Geological Conservation Review site and in the Sussex Downs Area of Outstanding Natural Beauty.

This site provides important biostratigraphical and lithostratigraphical evidence about environmental conditions during the last 100,000 years, the Last Glacial Period and the Holocene. It is notable for its extensive early and mid Holocene deposits and for having yielded a series of radiocarbon dates.
