= Cocktion =

Jamaican dessert

- Course: Dessert
- Place of origin: Jamaica
- Main ingredients: Corn, sugar

Cocktion is a dessert in Jamaican cuisine made from parched corn and sugar rolled into balls and sometimes colored.

== See also ==
- List of Jamaican dishes
