= Blackdown, West Sussex =

Hill summit in the South Downs National Park in Sussex, England

Blackdown
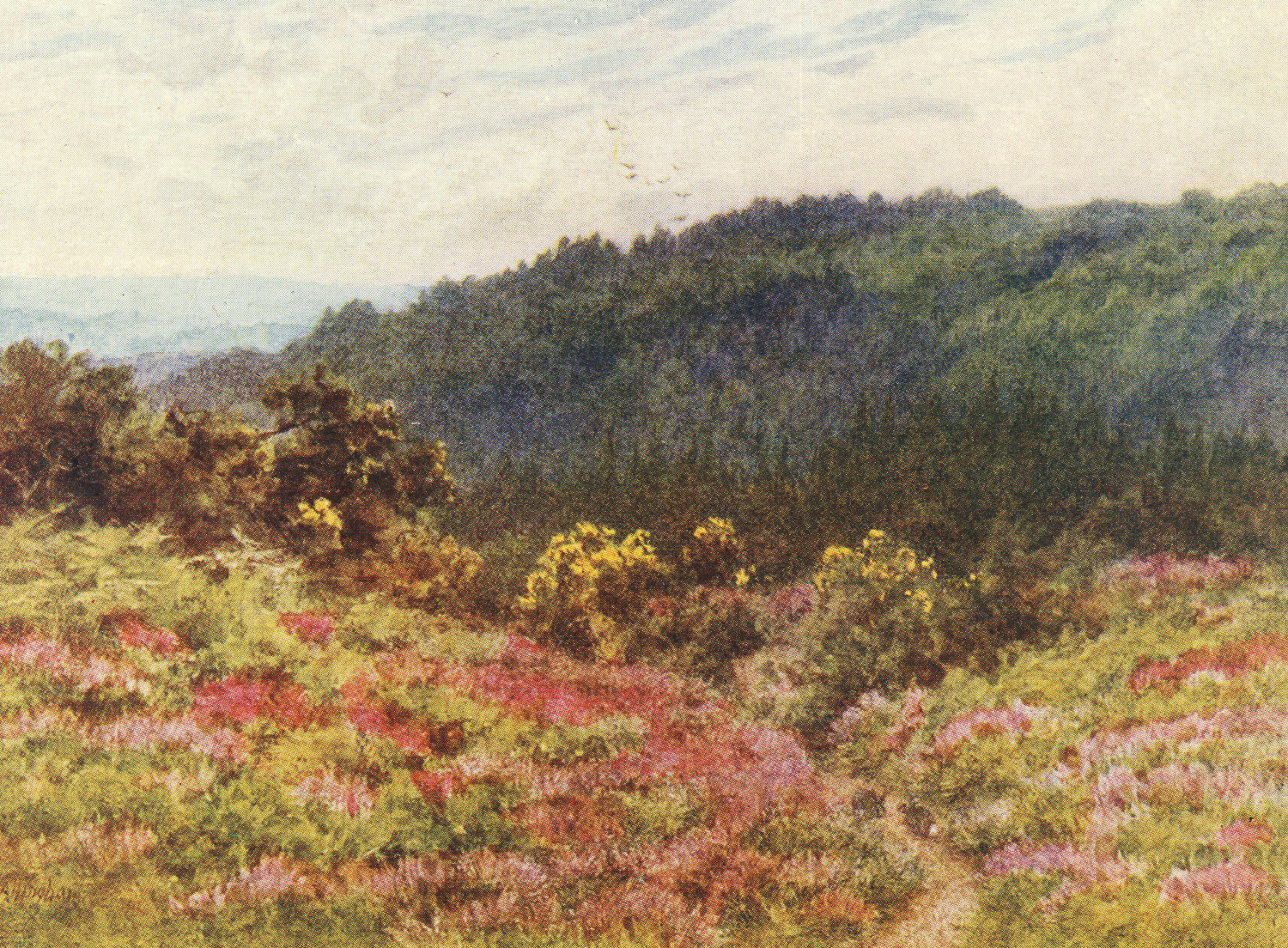
- View of Blackdown, watercolour by Helen Allingham, (1902)

Highest point
- Elevation: 279.7 m (918 ft)
- Prominence: 191 m (627 ft)
- Parent peak: Leith Hill
- Listing: Marilyn, County Top
- Coordinates: 51°03′31″N 0°41′22″W

Geography
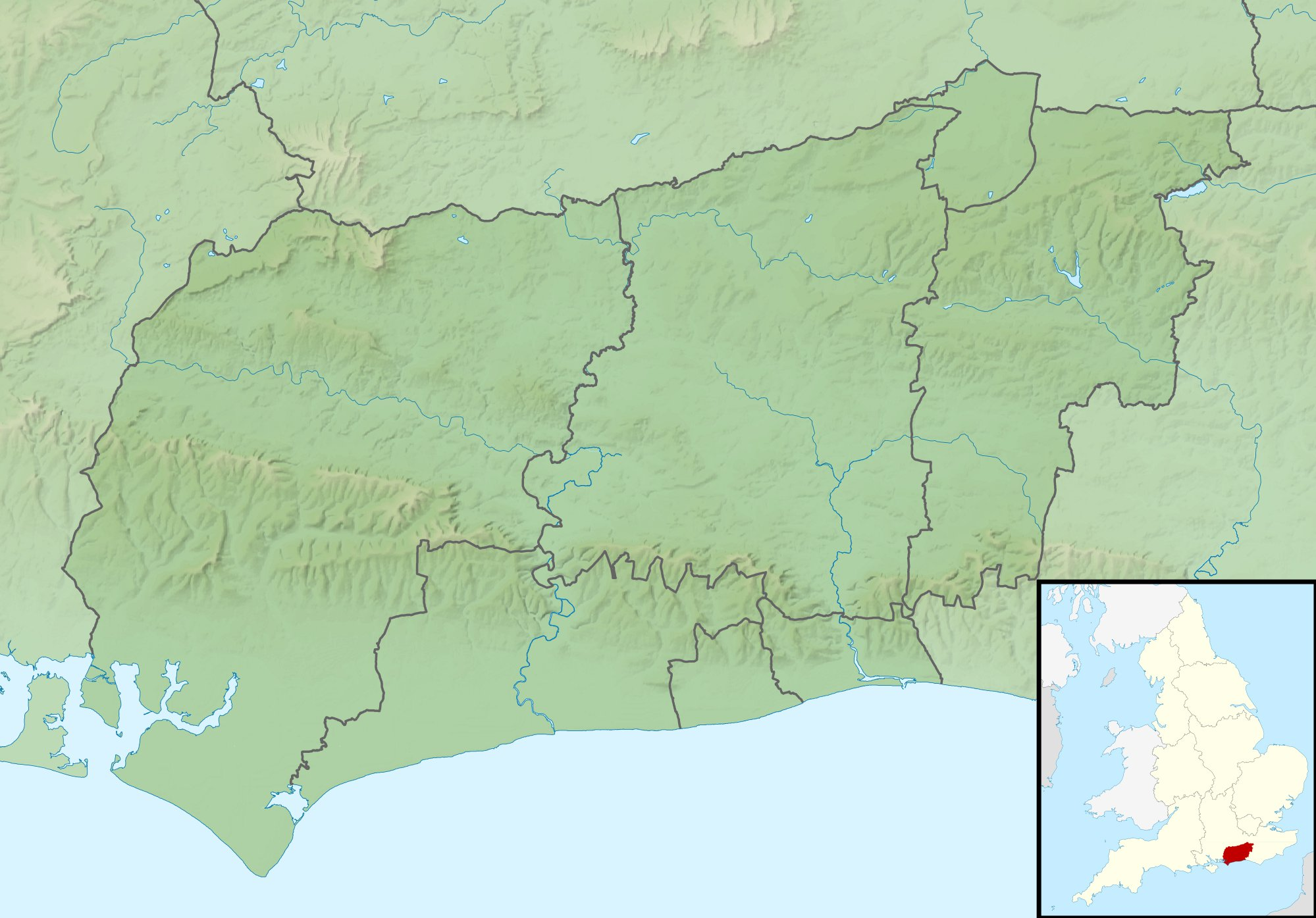
- Location within West Sussex
- Location: Western Weald, South Downs National Park, England
- Parent range: Greensand Ridge (broken range)
- OS grid: SU919296
- Topo map: OS Landranger 197, Explorer OL33

Climbing
- Easiest route: Wall along Tennyson's Lane. 3 car parks at Tennysons Lane (to north), 1 at Fernden Lane (to south)

Blackdown, or Black Down, is the highest point in Sussex, located in the South Downs National Park in England, with a summit elevation 279.7 metres (918 ft). It is one of the highest points in the south east of England, exceeded by Walbury Hill, Leith Hill and Pilot Hill. Blackdown is protected as part of the South Downs National Park.

== Location ==
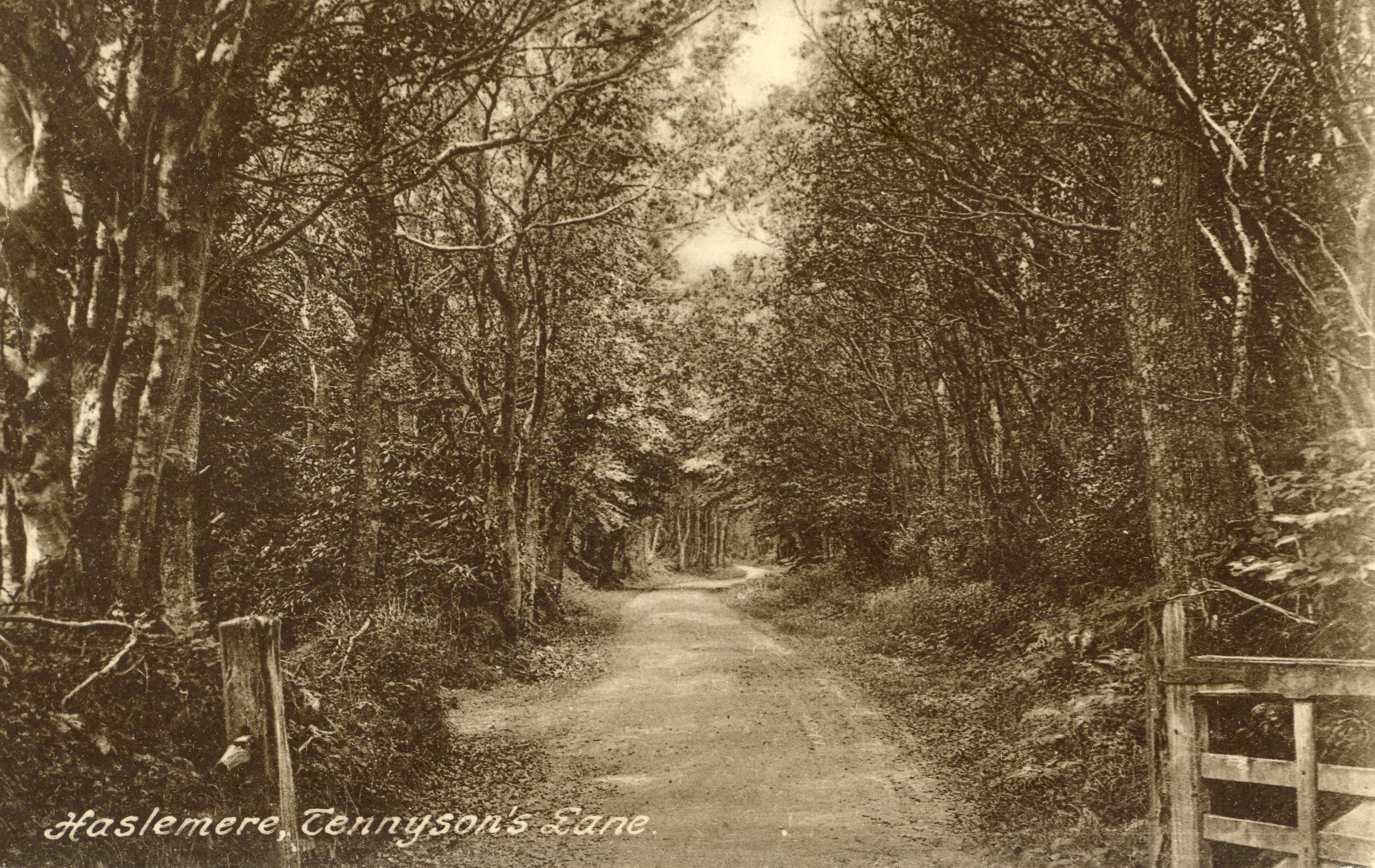
Tennyson's Lane c. 1900. The gate marks the Surrey/Sussex border, and was a favourite destination for Lord Tennyson's walks.

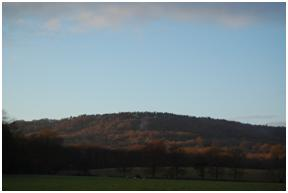
View from two miles (3 km) away

Blackdown is in the far northwest of West Sussex. The hill presents as a dark-sided mass that towers over the western parts of the Low Weald and south-west Surrey. There is no village or hamlet on Blackdown although it lies approximately equidistant from the railway town of Haslemere 2 miles (3.2 km) to the northwest, Fernhurst to the southwest, and Lurgashall to the southeast.

There are three National Trust car parks on Tennyson's Lane, which runs up Haste Hill from Haslemere. There are numerous footpaths from the surrounding villages, including a steep walk up the southern escarpment from Lurgashall. Blackdown is crossed by the Sussex Border Path and the Serpent Trail.

Tennyson's Lane is named in memory of the poet who lived here. The lane is a sunken, tree-tunnel lane that runs from Haslemere, past Aldworth House (today a couple of dwellings) to near the summit. The lane keeps to Arthur Paterson's description in 1905:

Trees meet overhead, copsewood surrounds it, and later, it is hedged by high sandy banks thickly overgrown with plant and scrub; squirrels and rabbits, and all other small woodland creatures, disport themselves over it. It twists and turns, and to the stranger appears to lead nowhere in particular.

== Natural history ==
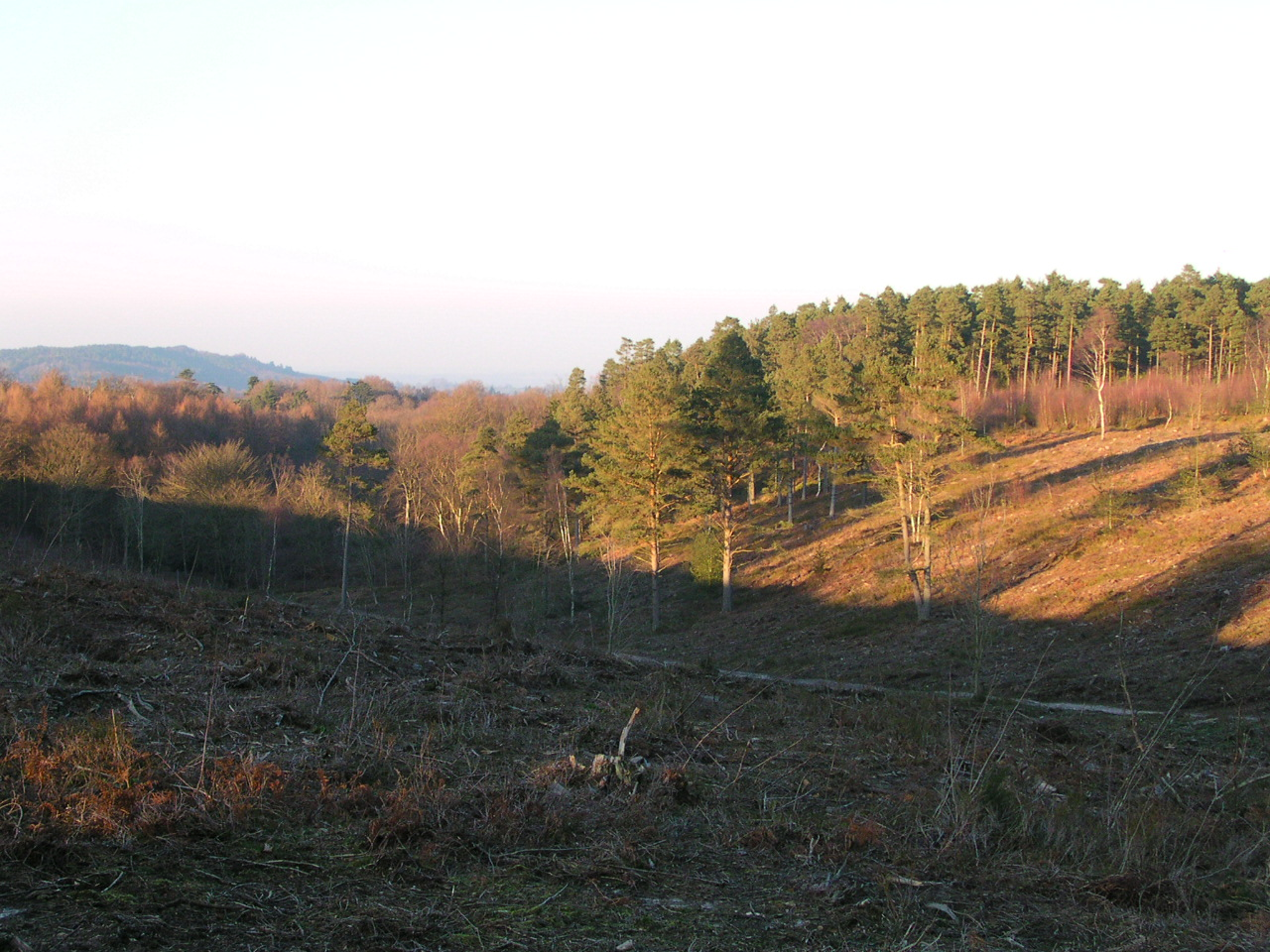
Pine trees cleared and thinned to restore heathland

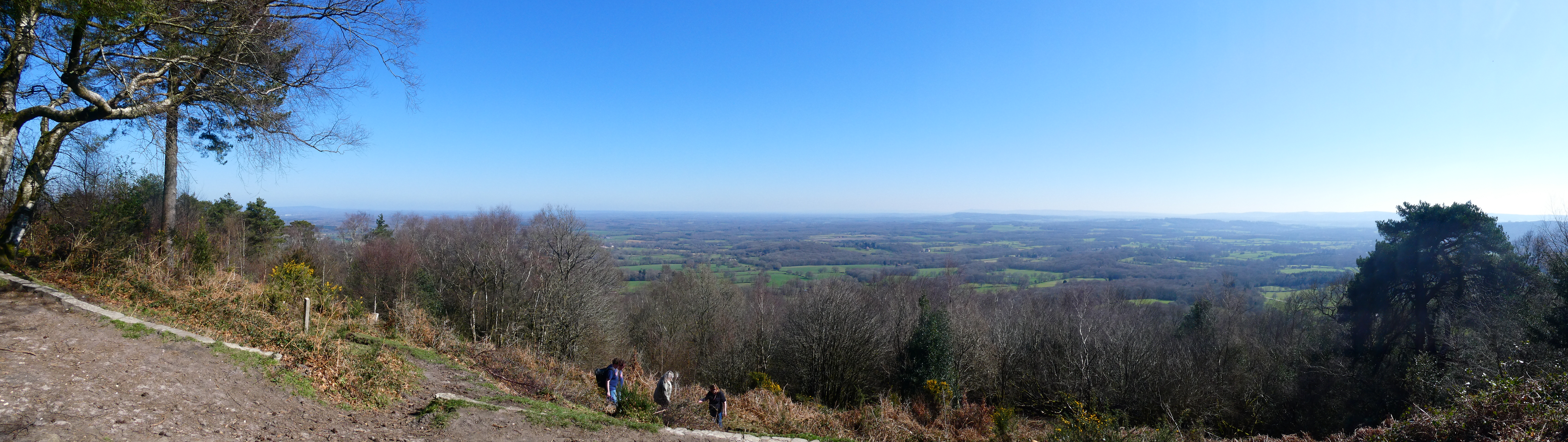
View south from Blackdown Hill over West Sussex and Hampshire

Geologically, Blackdown is part of the Greensand Ridge. The acid sandstone of Blackdown limits the range of plants. Until the beginning of the 20th century, Blackdown was a grazed common where trees were kept down by sheep, and heather dominated. After the end of regular grazing, Scots pine became the dominant species. The National Trust now carries out a programme of tree-felling and controlled burning to maintain and regenerate areas of open heath. The reserve has been fenced so that conservation grazing with cattle can be used as a management tool. Blackdown is an important habitat for insects and birds.

The pine- and heather-covered slopes are owned by the National Trust and have many paths and organised walks supported by volunteers, the local authorities, charities and guidebooks. The north of the long hilltop is pitted with very small old sand and gravel pits.

From north, large woods are: Homewood, shared with Surrey, Jays Wood (woven up with a farmstead of similar size), Abester's Copse lining the eastern slope, Quellwood Common, Quell Copse and Windfell Wood/Ewhurst Copse (together a tapering triangle on the south side), Leazers Wood, Bridge Reeds, Sheetland, Lye Wood (a break in a linear farm), and the belts of woodland of Alder and Chase Woods, south of the town.

A geological relief model of Blackdown, and much information on its natural history, can be found in the Haslemere Educational Museum.

== History ==
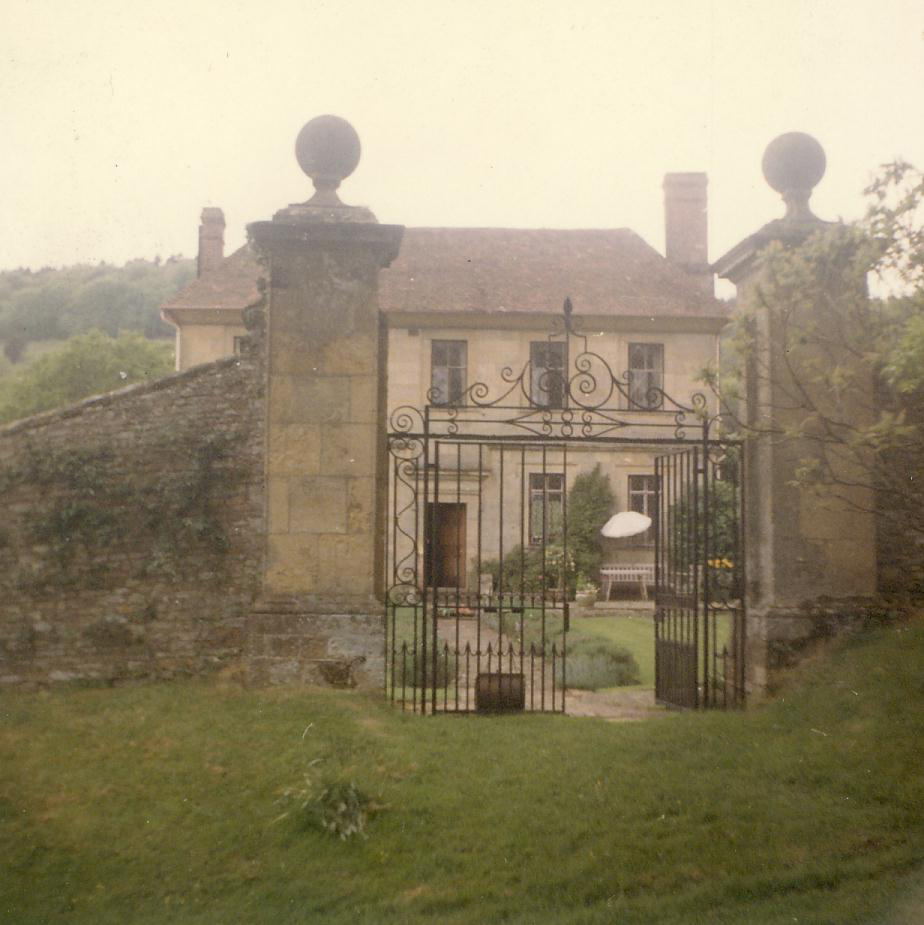
Old Manor Farm, Tennyson's Lane

Flint artefacts show there has been settlement on Blackdown since at least the Mesolithic period, around 6000 BC.

The ownership of the Blackdown Estate can be traced back to the 14th century, to William Yaldwyn of Blackdown (1298–1375), who received the Patent of Esquire in 1330. The Yaldwyn family tree shows the estate as having been inherited by eight successive generations. William de Blackdown and Sutton (1342–1418) is said to have fought at the Battle of Agincourt.

Although the Yaldwyns had owned extensive farmlands in Sussex since at least the year 1300, it was William Yaldwyn the elder who succeeded to the property in 1600 and made full commercial use of the estate and surrounding lands. In 1627 he secured the sole right to purchase iron ore mined on the extensive Petworth Estate. This made him a wealthy man and by 1640 he had built the central portion of the present Blackdown House.

During the English Civil War (1642–1651), there was an enormous increase in the demand for iron for the production of ordnance and materiel. Oliver Cromwell was said to have stayed at Blackdown House. Although the exact date of his visit is unknown, it was probably during 1644–45 when he went to assist the Earl of Essex and Sir William Waller during the campaigns in the west of England. The room where the Cromwell slept at Blackdown is still known as the Oliver Cromwell bedroom. The four-poster bed remained in the house until Blackdown was sold by William Henry Yaldwyn (1801–1866) in 1844.

When Richard Yaldwyn died in 1807, the Blackdown Estate consisted of 1300 acres and included Blackdown, Brockhurst, Vale Wool, High Diddlesford, Cotchett, Reeth, Sheetland, Cooks Bridge Farms and Blackdown Cottage Barfold-under-Beacon. Many members of the Yaldwyn family are buried at St. Laurence's at Lurgashall.

In 1944 the then owner W. E. Hunter donated Blackdown to the National Trust as a memorial to his wife. The Hunters are remembered by an inscribed stone seat at the Temple of the Winds. Today, the site is managed by the National Trust, with guidance and financial assistance from the Blackdown Committee of the National Trust.

== Architecture and buildings ==
As well as Aldworth House on the steep eastern flank and Foxholes (which together formed the estate of Alfred, Lord Tennyson), there is a range of architecture, especially in Victorian and turn-of-the-20th-century, rustic styles (such as Arts and Crafts). These include, to the west, Blackdown House, which is surrounded by daffodils in the spring; and to the east Old Manor Farm.

Because of its elevation, from 1796 to 1816 Blackdown hosted a shutter telegraph chain station, which linked the Admiralty in London to the Royal Navy in Portsmouth.

== Lord Tennyson ==
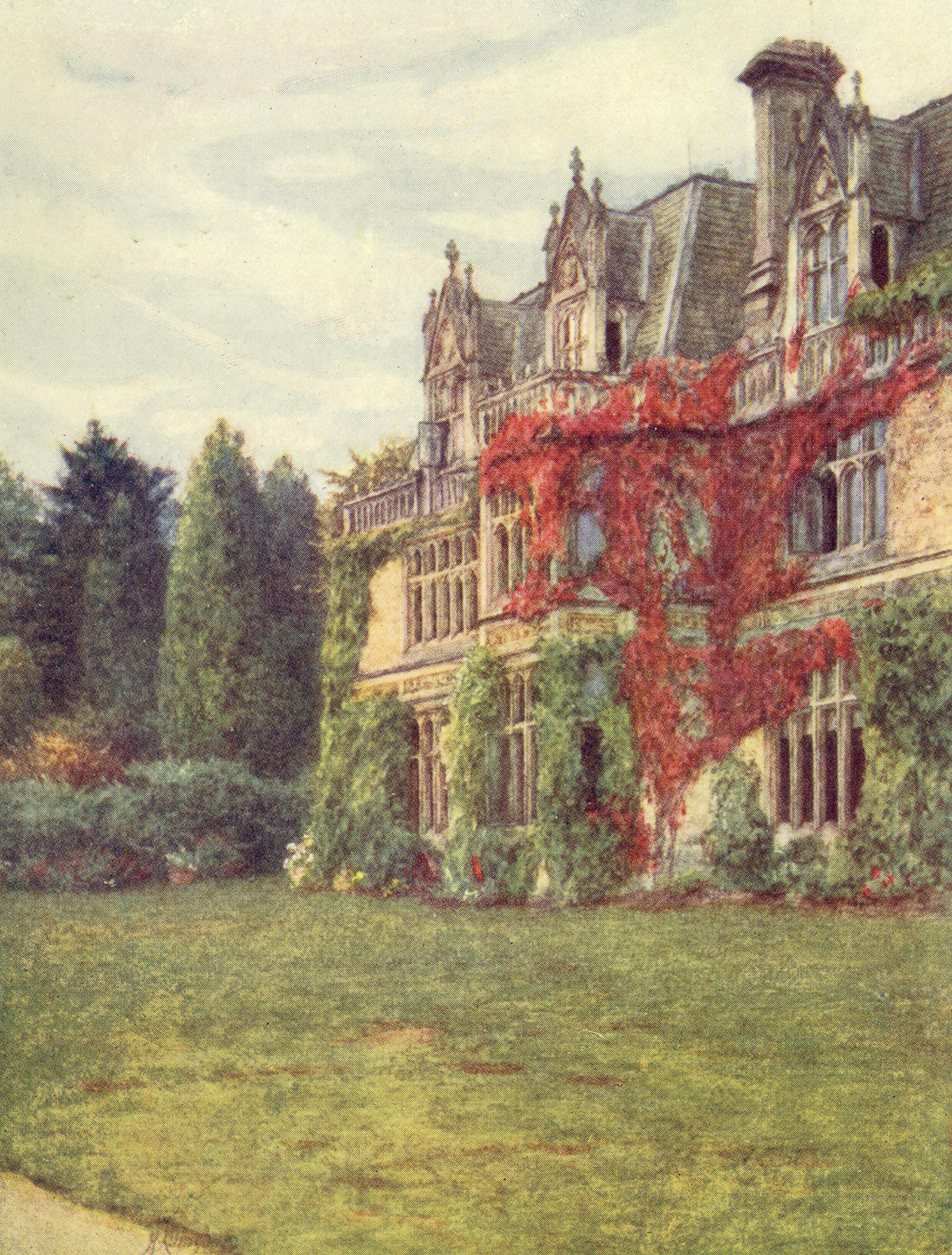
Aldworth, painted by Helen Allingham

Aside from its elevation and beauty, Blackdown is best known as the site of the poet Tennyson's houses, Aldworth and Foxholes. Keen to escape the summer "trippers" who came to his Isle of Wight home, Farringford House, Tennyson purchased Blackdown, and built Aldworth in 1869. The French-style Gothic revival house was designed by Sir James Knowles and built with local sandstone. It stands on a ridge overlooking the Weald, with far-reaching views. Lord Tennyson used it as his summer home, taking long walks over Blackdown. Helen Allingham was a frequent visitor then, and her illustrations to The Homes of Tennyson capture the landscape. Tennyson died in the house on 6 October 1892.

== Blackdown air crash ==
Iberia Flight 062 was a twin-engined Sud Aviation Caravelle registered EC-BDD operating a scheduled flight from Málaga Airport, Spain, to London Heathrow Airport. While on approach to Heathrow on 4 November 1967, the Caravelle descended far below the flight level assigned to it and flew into the southern slope of Blackdown Hill in West Sussex, killing all 37 on board. Lost were the all-Spanish crew of six, 25 Britons (including the actress June Thorburn), two Americans, two Spaniards and two Australians. The crash also killed a flock of sheep, damaged parts of the roof of Upper Black Down House and destroyed a garage.

Next station upwards	Admiralty Shutter telegraph line 1795	Next station downwards
Hascombe	Blackdown, West Sussex	Beacon Hill
