= East Hampshire AONB =

Protected area in England (1962–2010)

Coordinates: 51.00°N 1.05°W

East Hampshire
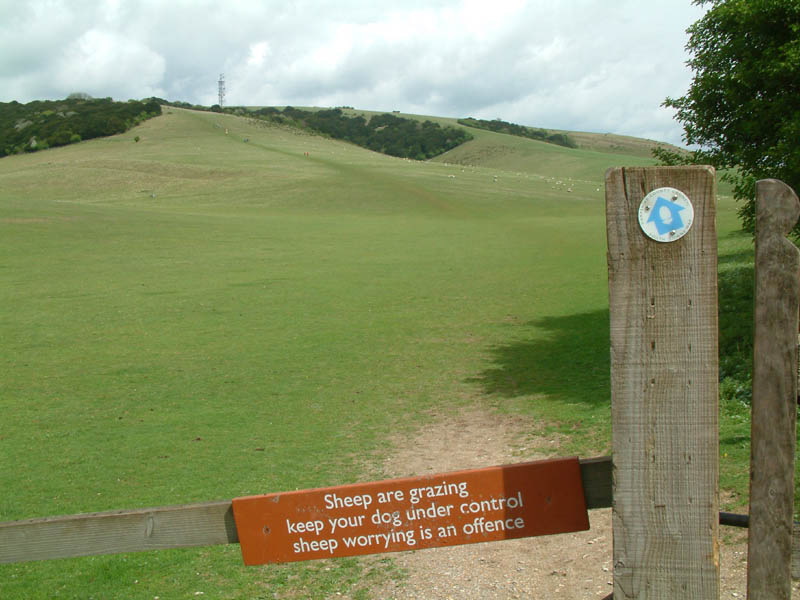
- Butser Hill near Petersfield, Hampshire
- Interactive map of East Hampshire
- Location: Hampshire, England

East Hampshire Area of Outstanding Natural Beauty (AONB) in England was designated in 1962. The designation was revoked in March 2010, together with the neighbouring Sussex Downs AONB, upon the establishment of the South Downs National Park. The southern part of the area is mainly rolling chalk downland used for farming that is a westward extension of the Sussex Downs. The north and east includes steep wooded hills and heathland.

Features include: Petersfield, the Rother valley, Warnford and West Meon. Four National Nature Reserves and several Sites of Special Scientific Interest fall within the AONB. The Hanger's Way, South Downs Way, Staunton Way and Wayfarer's Walk long-distance paths pass through it.

Notable hills include Butser Hill near Petersfield, Beacon Hill and Old Winchester Hill near Corhampton and St Catherine's Hill and Cheesefoot Head near Winchester.

There was controversy in 1994 when a new stretch of the M3 motorway was cut through Twyford Down, separating St Catherine's Hill from the main AONB.
