= Sussex Downs AONB =

Protected area in England (1966–2010)

Coordinates: 50°57′N 0°42′W

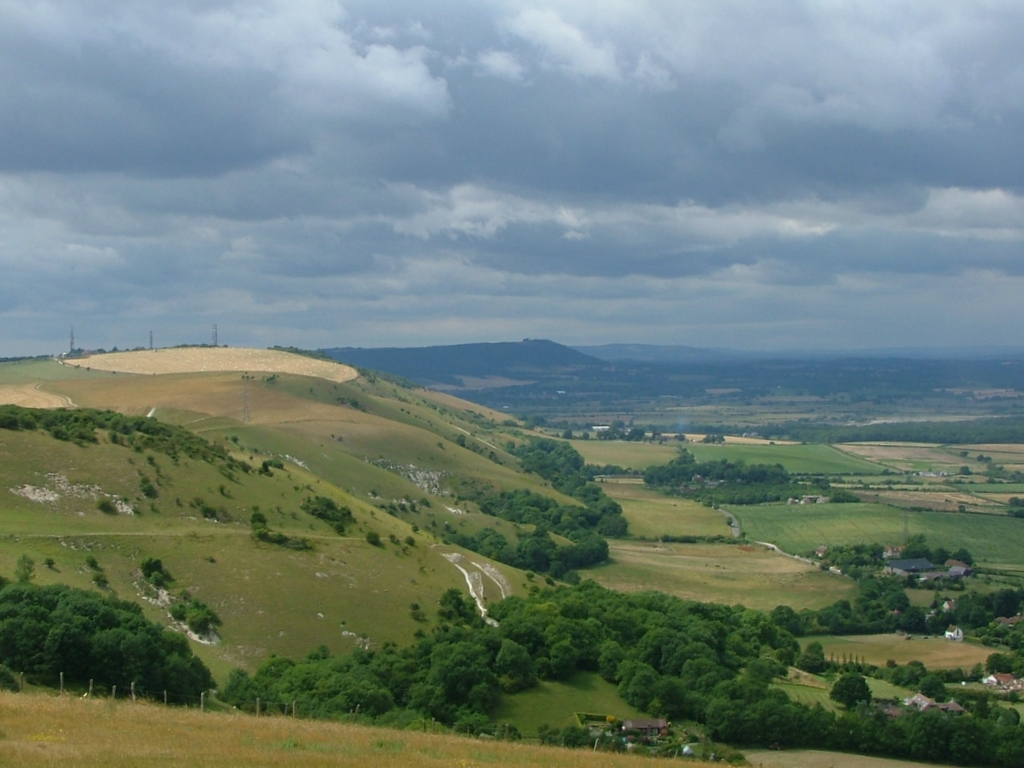
View of South Downs

Sussex Downs Area of Outstanding Natural Beauty in England was designated in 1966. The designation was revoked in March 2010, together with the neighbouring East Hampshire AONB, upon the establishment of the South Downs National Park.

The area of the AONB was largely the same as the portion of the National Park within East and West Sussex, containing the South Downs as well as part of The Weald.

In the latter years of the AONB, the management of the two AONBs of Sussex Downs and East Hampshire was combined under the South Downs Joint Committee, taking responsibility for conservation within the two areas in anticipation of the National Park.
