= Inkpen =

Coordinates: 51°22′37″N 1°28′05″W

- Village and civil parish
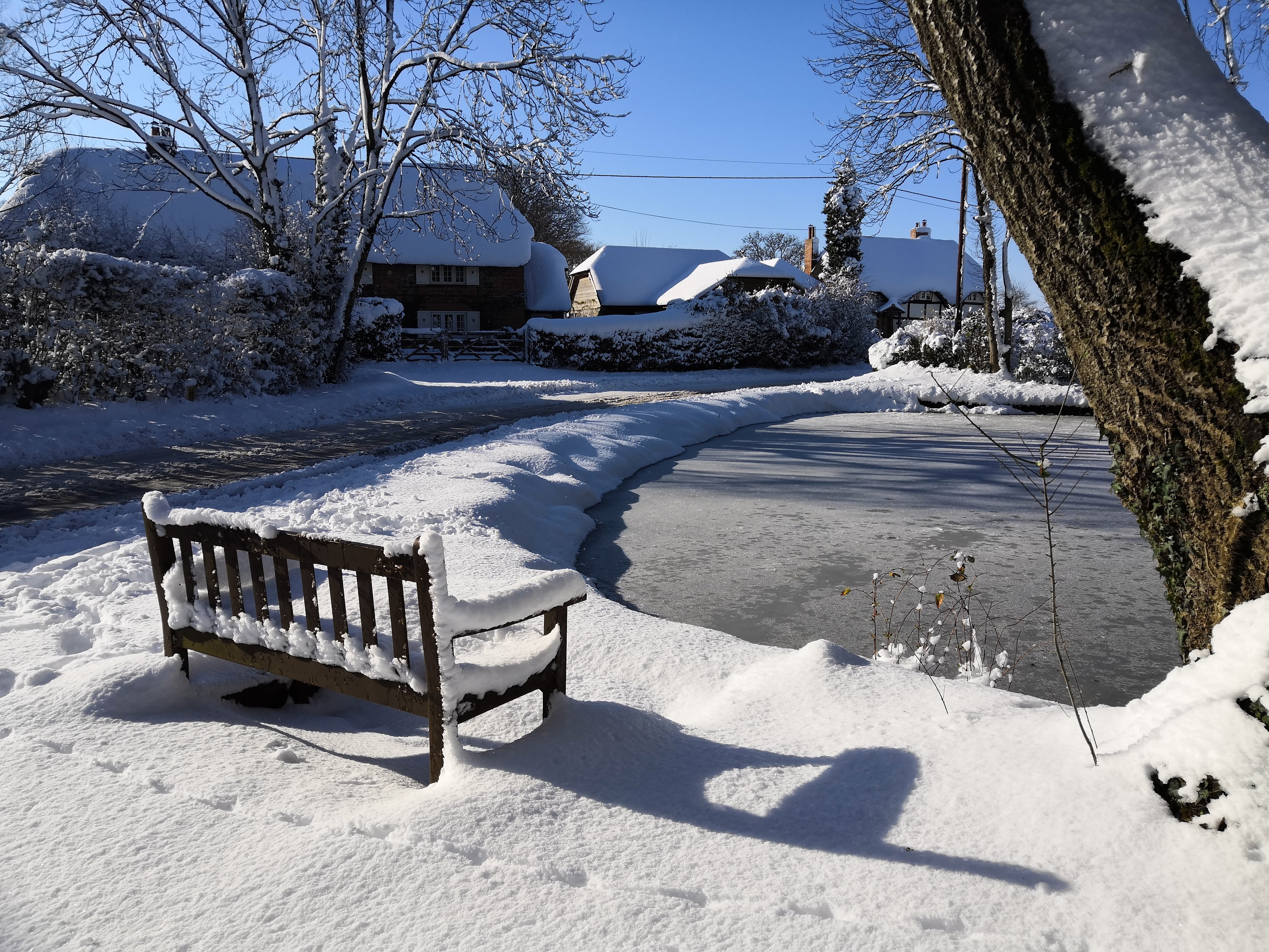
- Inkpen Pond in winter

- Location within Berkshire
- Area: 12.9 km^{2} (5.0 sq mi)
- Population: 855 (2011 census)
  - Density: 66/km^{2} (170/sq mi)
- OS grid reference: SU3664
- Civil parish: Inkpen
- Unitary authority: West Berkshire
- Ceremonial county: Berkshire
- Region: South East
- Country: England
- Sovereign state: United Kingdom
- Post town: Hungerford
- Postcode district: RG17
- Dialling code: 01488
- Police: Thames Valley
- Fire: Royal Berkshire
- Ambulance: South Central
- UK Parliament: Newbury
- Website: Inkpen Village

Inkpen is a village and civil parish in West Berkshire, 3.5 miles (5.6 km) southeast of Hungerford, most of the land of which is cultivated fields with scattered woodland once part of a former forest of Savernake. Inkpen has boundaries with Wiltshire and Hampshire, including parts of Walbury Hill, the highest point in South East England, and Inkpen Hill.

== History ==
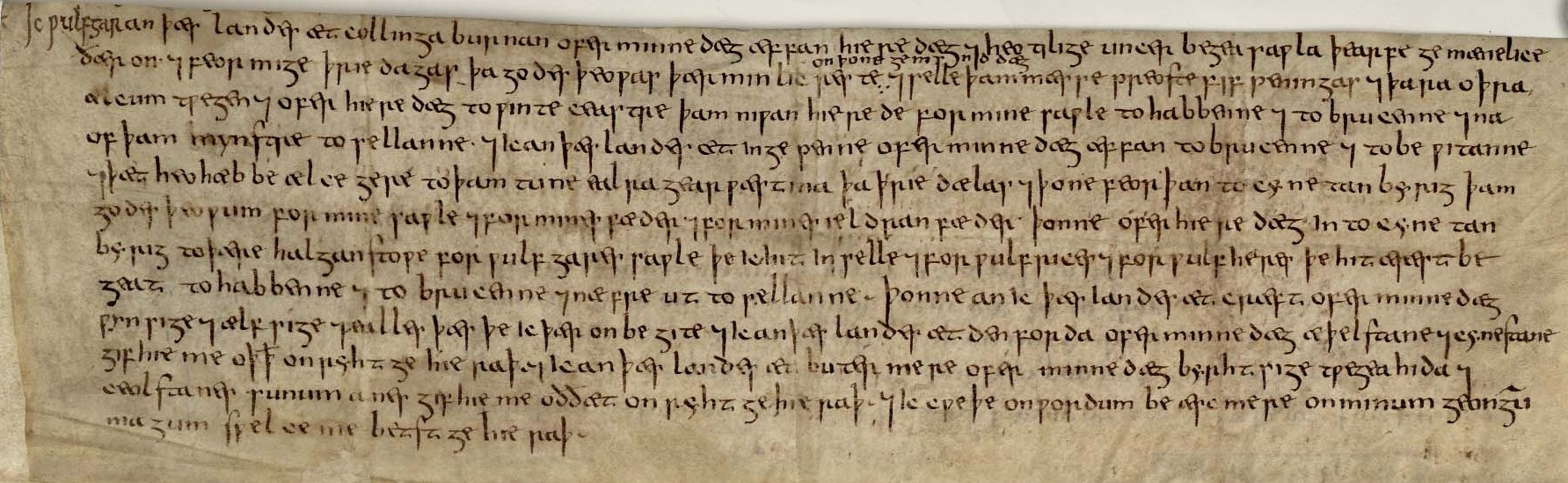
Will of Wulfgar, AD 931–939, granting land in Inkpen to the "holy place" (halgan stowe) at Kintbury (Cynetanbyrig)

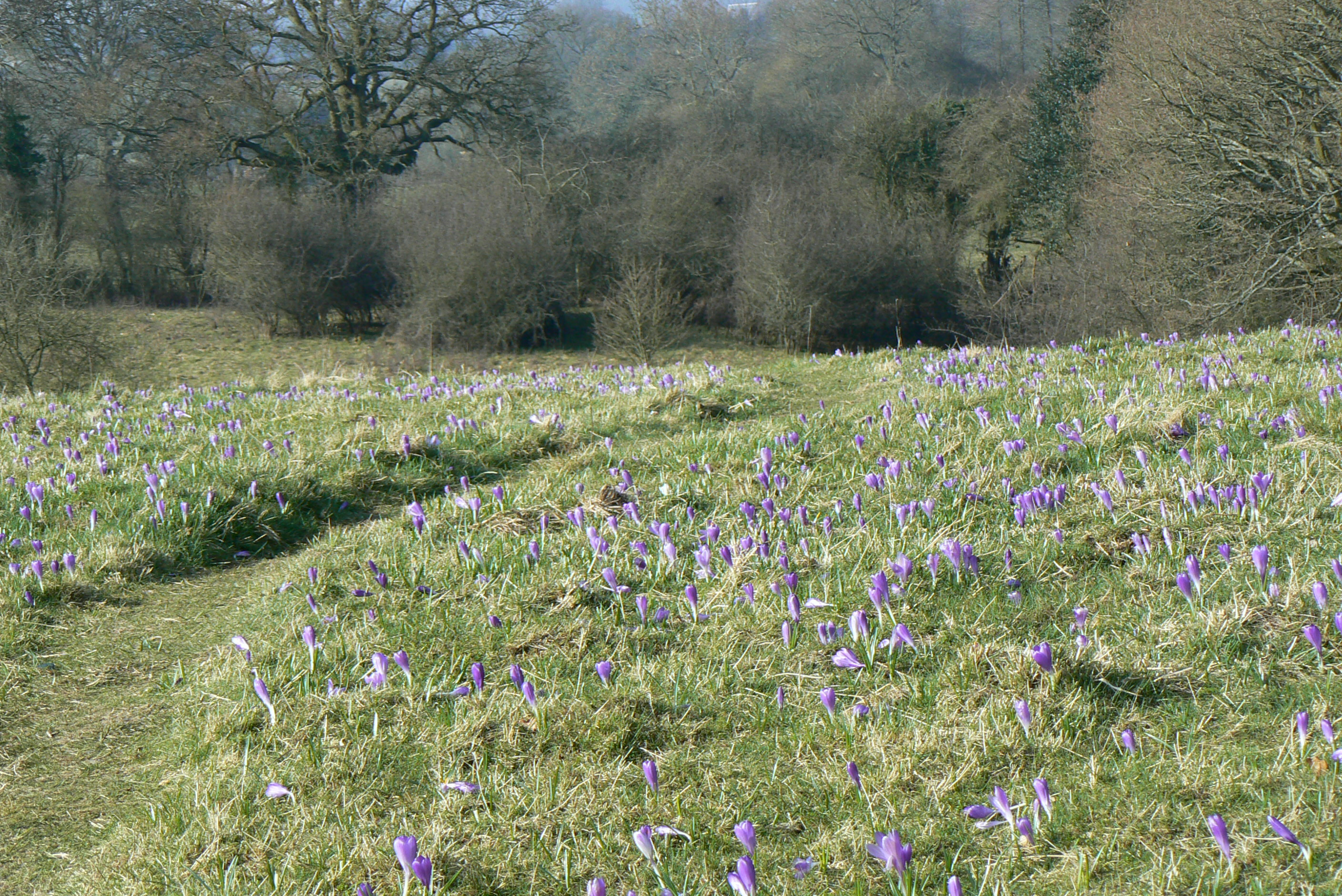
Crocus field in March

The earliest record of Inkpen is in the Cotton Charter viii, dated between AD 931 and 939. This includes the will of a Saxon thegn named Wulfgar, whose name means "wolf-spear". Wulfgar owned "land at inche penne" which he "had from Wulfric, who had it from Wulfhere who first owned it", his father and grandfather respectively. Wulfgar left this to be divided amongst named heirs: three quarters to his wife, Aeffe, the other quarter to "the servants of God" at the holy place in Kintbury. Following Aeffe's death, her share was also to go to the holy place at Kintbury "for the souls of Wulfgar, Wulfric and Wulfhere".

=== Evolution of the name ===
Below is a selection of subsequent spellings of a dictated Inkpen over a period of some three hundred years by various scribes:

- Ingepenne 935.
- Hingepene 1086.
- Ingepenna 1167, Ingepenn 1167, Ingepenne 1167, Yngepenn 1167, Yngepenne 1167.
- Ynkepenee 1230, Yngelpenne 1235, Ynkepenne 1241, Ingelpenne 1241, Hingepenna 1242, Ingepepenn 1242, Ingelpenn 1252, Enkepenne 1282, Inckepene 1292.

=== Stone Age ===
The area was part of Savernake Forest, one of the first landscapes to reappear in all but southernmost Britain when the Ice Age receded at least 10,000 years ago. The ice left the deposits of heavy clay soil found in Inkpen that give rise to the occasionally saturated lowland areas. From the Berkshire Downs, pockets of ancient woodland scattered in and around Inkpen persist. The earliest sign of habitation in Inkpen dates to the Mesolithic period between 10,000 and 5500 BC. Only one artefact has been uncovered, to the west of the gibbet, but even this helps confirm the traditional view of small groups of Mesolithic people following established cyclic seasonal trails through the forested countryside, often along hilltops. They may have attempted to manipulate resources through forest clearance.

There were people living on the Downs of Inkpen some 5,000 years ago. Intact pots by the Beaker People have been unearthed at the Hungerford end of Craven Road in Inkpen, opposite Colnbrook Copse, as well as on the Downs. They show skill and artistic design and now reside in the West Berkshire Museum. Early Beaker People flint tools have been found close to the old saw mills at the end of Folly Road, along with evidence that suggests they were manufactured nearby. The pottery finds at Craven Road were found in a layer of sand close to where an ancient brook known as the Ingeflod would have run. At the bottom of the hill, on Hungerford Road, leaving Inkpen, flooding in wet weather, still sometimes re-enacts the meanderings of this river through the fields to the northeast. It seems likely that this fresh water attracted the beaker people to settle and live in their round houses there, using the fertile soil for crops and livestock grazing. Evidence of an ancient field system is certainly still visible not far from the Inkpen Long barrow.

The West Berkshire Museum has a number of bone tools and a bronze knife found in Inkpen that date from this period. In 1908 trenches dug at Sadler's Farm, the site of a ploughed-out barrow, revealed a large quantity of animal and some human bones, horns and some early or pre-Romano-British potsherds. The Beaker People buried their dead in simple stone mounds since called round barrows, often with a beaker alongside the body. Several of these remain on the hilltop to the west of the Gibbet. Four were explored in 1908 when Neolithic tools and small urns with burnt human bones, suggesting cremation, were found. Later, in the Bronze Age, communal long barrows were used, like the one under Combe Gibbet.

=== Iron Age ===
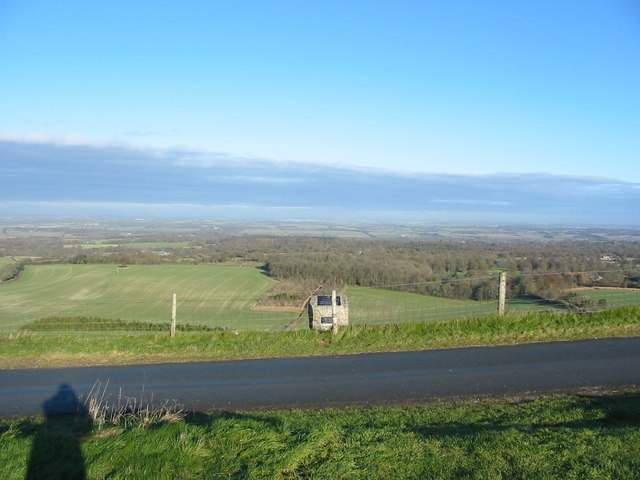
View from Walbury Hill looking north

In the Iron Age burial mounds and circles gave way to permanent fields and hillforts such as Walbury Camp on Walbury Hill adjacent to Gallows Down. It was built in around 600 BC and remained in use until about the time of the Roman conquest of Britain. The construction of its massive banks and ditches, encircling some 80 acres (32 ha), would have been an enormous feat. It would have been defended by a timber fence or palisade and populated with round houses and, maybe, pens for livestock. Walbury Camp was built, not only for the protection of the locals from attack by warring groups, but also in response to the increasing importance of the hilltop tracks for trade and the movement of livestock.

=== Roman ===
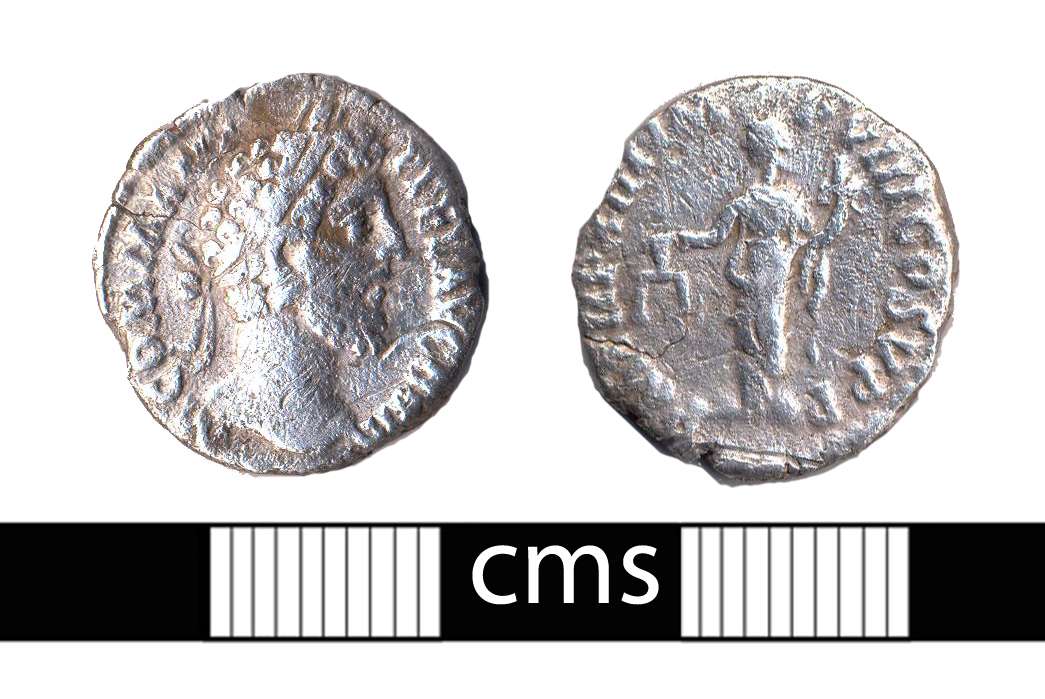
A silver denarius from the reign of Commodus, found in Inkpen and dated to c. 187 – c. 188

There is little evidence of Roman activity in Inkpen. Some of the hill trail trade was diverted down to the Ermin Way and Romanized Britons certainly lived in the area. In 1984 archaeological finds were discovered near Lower Green suggesting the presence of a Roman dwelling of some kind, possibly not unlike the Roman villas found at nearby Kintbury and Littlecote. During building work near Combe in 2003, a Roman burial was found.

=== Saxon ===
The Roman army withdrew from Britain in around AD 410 and the settlement of Anglo-Saxons from Denmark and Northern Germany followed soon afterward. At the foot of Inkpen Beacon is, what some believe to be, the eastern end of the Wansdyke, a long ditch and bank or linear defensive earthwork, built sometime between 400 and 700. Current theory suggests a date around 470 when some hill forts were being refortified by the Romano-Britons. It runs east–west between Inkpen Beacon and Portishead near Bristol. Although its eastern end is generally thought to be just south of Marlborough, this small section is named "Wansdyke" on Inkpen's enclosure award map of 1733. Its construction clearly points to danger from the north, perhaps from the first Saxons of what is now Berkshire, who settled around Abingdon. Early Saxon coins, known as sceattas, have been found on the Downs.

== Amenities and landmarks ==
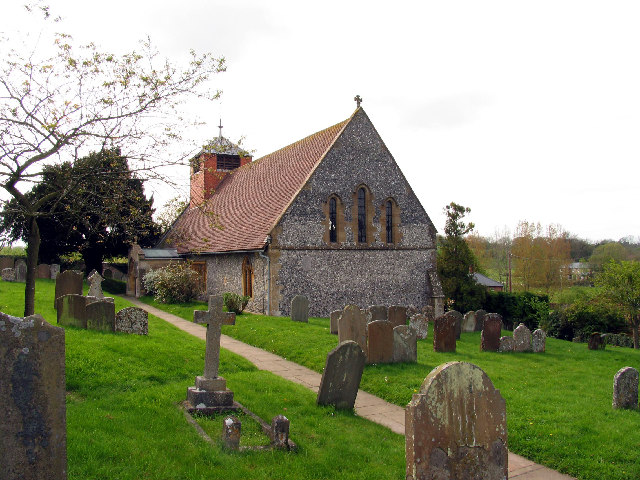
St. Michael's parish church

The parish church of Saint Michael is 13th century. The east window of the chancel and west window of the nave were added in the 15th century. The church was restored by Clapton Crabb Rolfe in 1896; he added the south porch, south window and north aisle. The church's new reredos, altar tables, rood and rood screen, pulpit, lectern and much new seating were carved for Rolfe by Harry Hems of Exeter. The church is a Grade II* listed building.

Near the centre of the village, just off Post Office Road, is Inkpen Crocus Fields a large field of saffron crocuses, one of only two in the United Kingdom. According to the information plaque, the plants are believed to have been brought here by the Knights Templar in the Middle Ages for the production of saffron. It is currently owned by the Berkshire, Buckinghamshire and Oxfordshire Wildlife Trust.

Inkpen House, the old rectory, was built in 1695 and is a Grade II* listed building. Behind is a remarkable miniature Versailles garden inspired by the great French landscape architect, André Le Notre. Kirby House, a Grade II* listed building, was built in 1733 and West Court House, Grade II listed, in two stages in the 18th century. There are several listed cottages around the village.

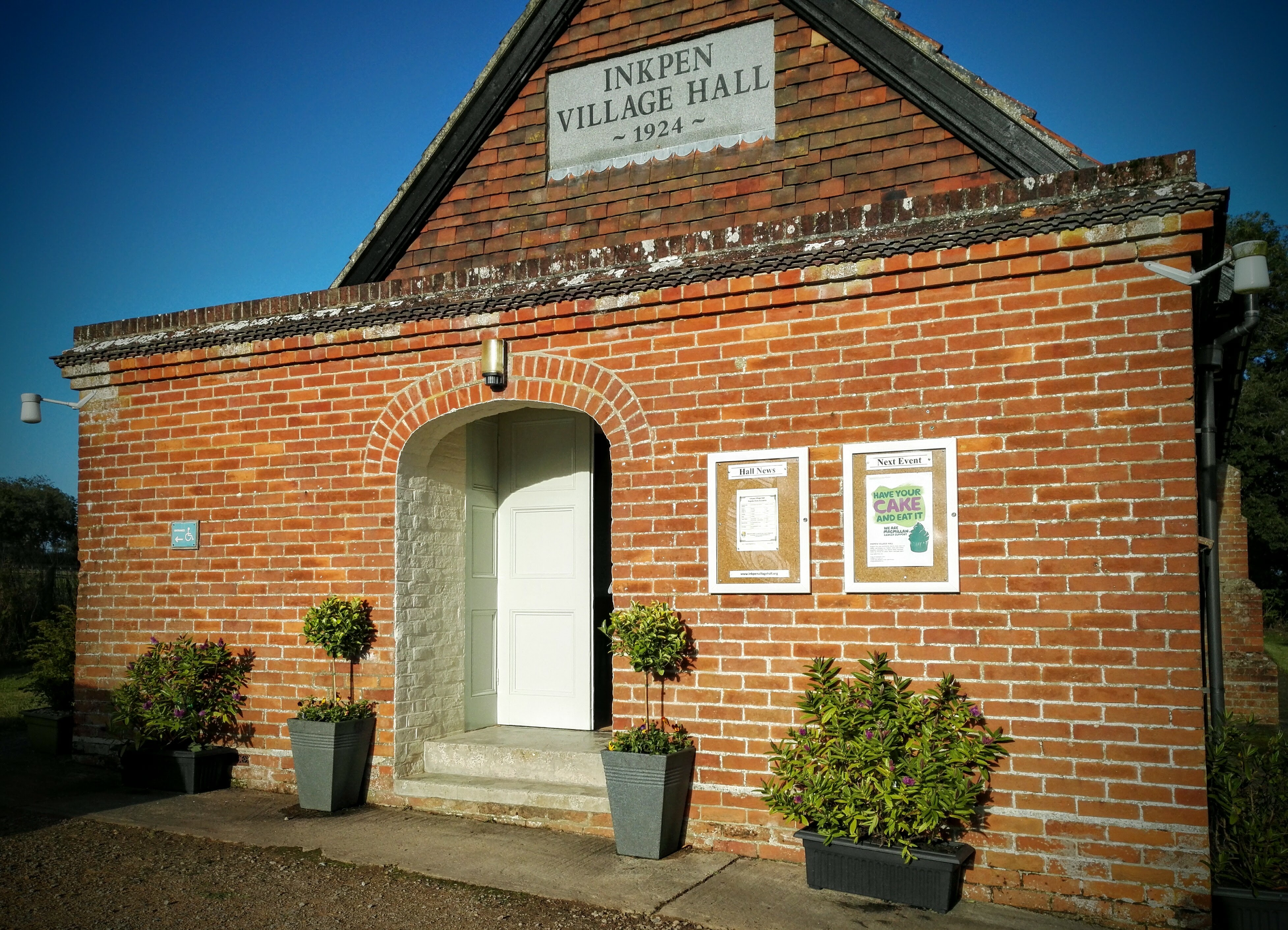
Inkpen Village Hall

Inkpen Village Hall, near the village pond, was built in 1924 and holds social, sports, hobbies and events for the whole village. The hall has a monthly farmers' market. Inkpen primary school, designed by G.E. Street and built in 1850, has about sixty pupils and is a Grade II listed building. Inkpen had two public houses, the Crown & Garter and the Swan Inn, the latter closed in April 2018 and was for sale as of December 2018. Both were hotels and had restaurants.

Half of the crest of Walbury Hill is in the parish, 1.5 miles (2.4 km) south of the village nucleus. The whole of the parish accordingly is in the North Wessex Downs area of outstanding natural beauty. At its summit, 974 feet (297 m) above sea-level, is Walbury Camp Iron Age hill fort, the start of the Test Way and the Wayfarers Walk. On the adjacent Gallows Down, but just within the parish of Combe, are Combe Gibbet and Inkpen long barrow.

== Demography ==
2011 Published Statistics: Population, home ownership and extracts from Physical Environment, surveyed in 2005
Output area	Homes owned outright	Owned with a loan	Socially rented	Privately rented	Other	km^{2} roads	km^{2} water	km^{2} domestic gardens	Usual residents	km^{2}
Civil parish	145	110	36	39	11	0.130	0.009	0.403	855	12.9

== See also ==
- Anvilles

== Sources ==
- Page, W.H.; Ditchfield, P.H., eds. (1924). A History of the County of Berkshire, Volume 4. Victoria County History. pp. 200–205.
- Pevsner, Nikolaus (1966). Berkshire. The Buildings of England. Harmondsworth: Penguin Books. pp. 158–159.
- Saint, Andrew (1970). "Three Oxford Architects". Oxoniensia. XXXV. Oxfordshire Architectural and Historical Society: 53ff. Archived from the original on 28 September 2007.
