= Wayfarer's Walk =

71-mile footpath in southern England

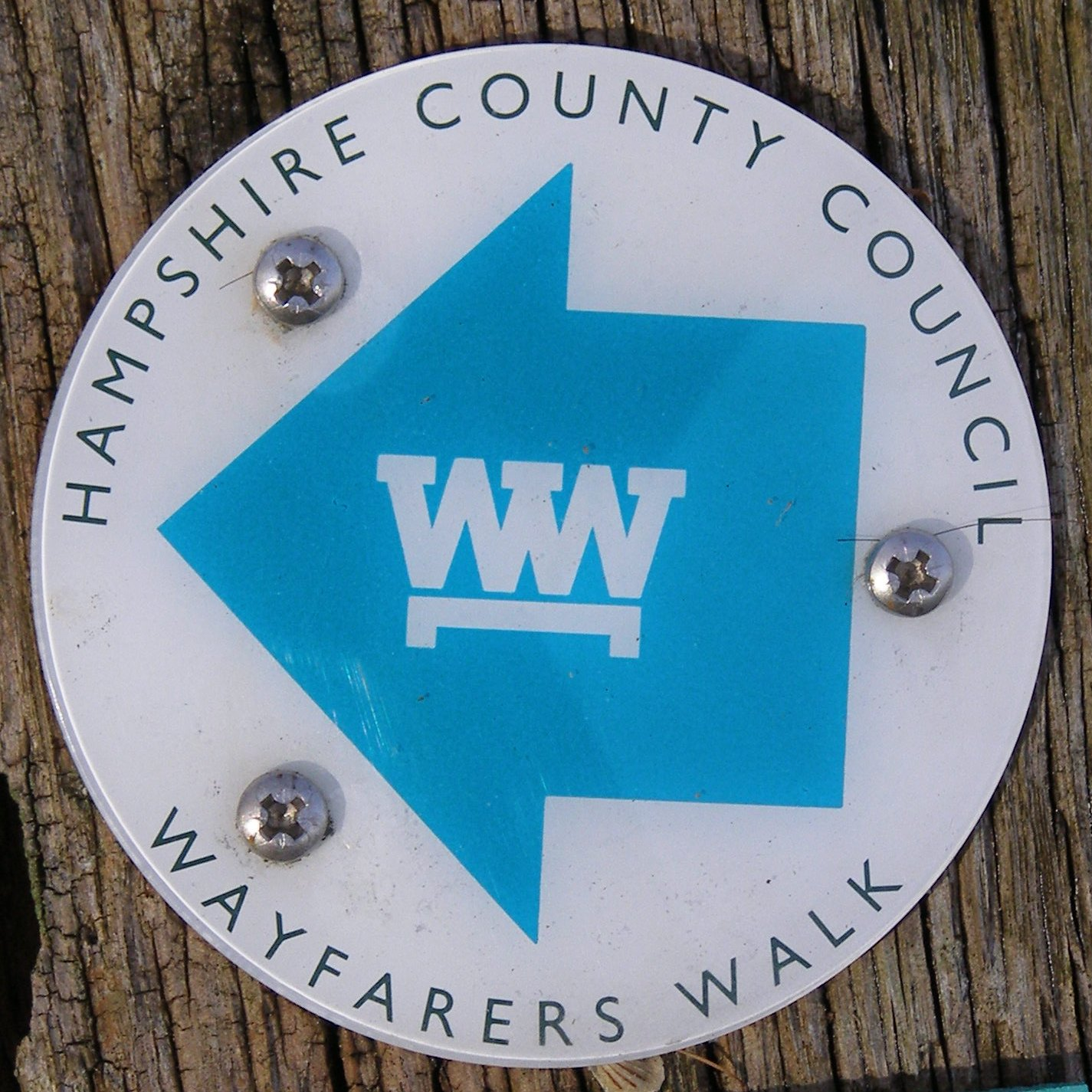
- Wayfarer's Walk waymarker
- Length: 70 mi (110 km)
- Location: England
- Trailheads: Walbury Hill in West Berkshire; 51.357°N 1.471°W; Emsworth in Hampshire; 50.844°N 0.932°W
- Use: Hiking
- Season: All year

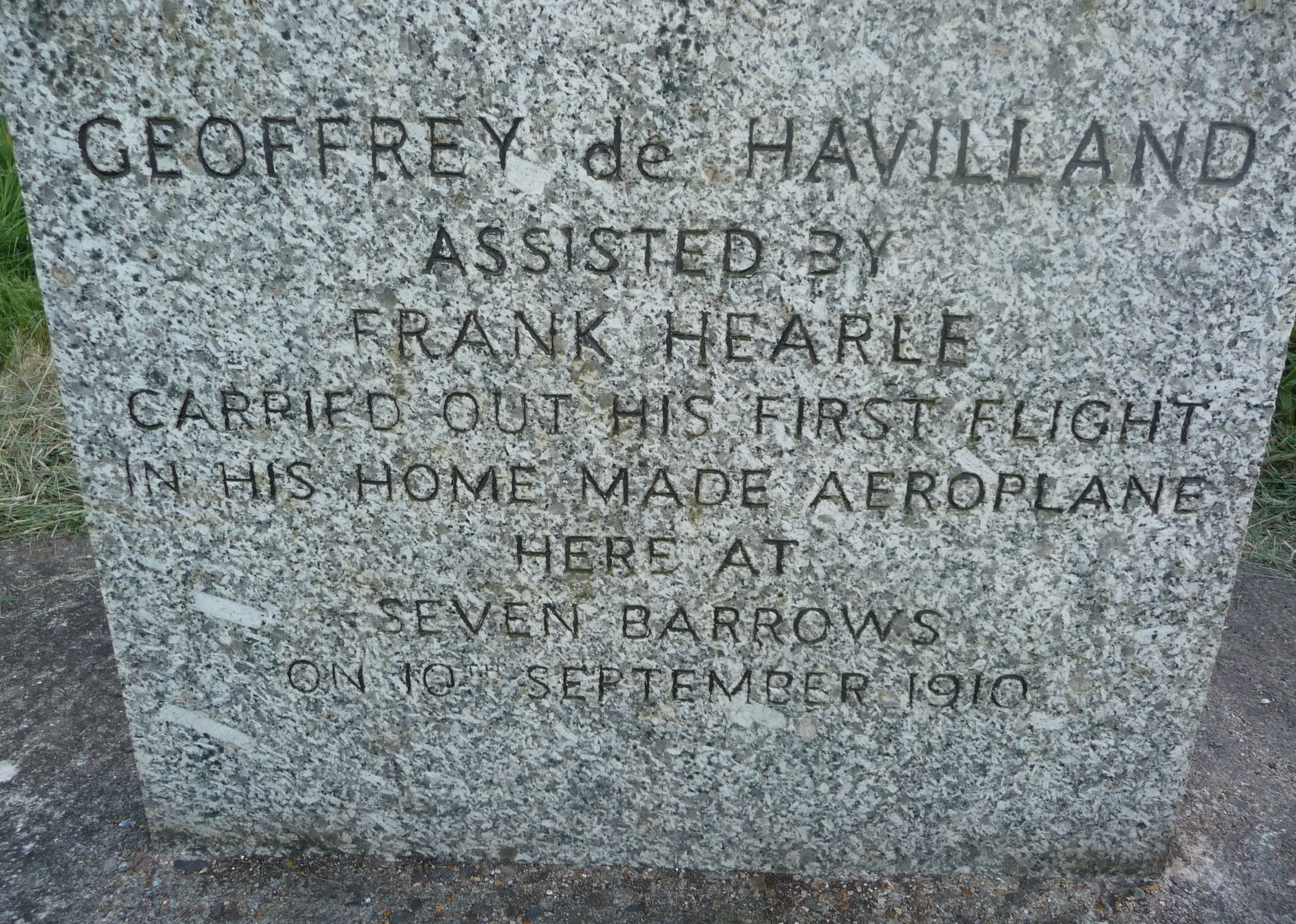
De Havilland Memorial Stone near Seven Barrows Field and Beacon Hill from A34

The Wayfarer's Walk is a 71-mile (114 km) long-distance footpath in England from Walbury Hill, Berkshire, to Emsworth, Hampshire.

The north-west end is at the car park on top of Walbury Hill, near the landmark Combe Gibbet, and the south-east end is Emsworth town square.

The footpath approximates an ancient route that might have been used by drovers taking cattle for export. It passes through the towns of New Alresford, Droxford, Hambledon, Havant and Emsworth and the villages of North Oakley, Deane, Dummer, Brown Candover, Abbotstone, Cheriton, Hinton Ampner, Kilmeston, Soberton, and Denmead.

By the path is a memorial to the first flight of Geoffrey de Havilland. The footpath also passes close to Watership Down.

The footpath is waymarked by metal and plastic disks on wooden and metal posts, trees and street furniture, and where this is not possible stickers on lampposts etc. It has also spawned several circular routes that use sections of the main footpath. These are also waymarked.

This route is shown as a series of green diamonds on Ordnance Survey 1:25,000 maps and as a series of red diamonds on Ordnance Survey 1:50,000 maps.

Walbury Hill is also the start of the Test Way and is the start of the Combe Gibbet to Overton 16 Mile Trail Race, the first 11 miles of its route being on Wayfarer's Walk.

== Places of interest ==
The following places of interest, hillfort sites and hills can be found along the length of the Walk (listed from southeast to northwest):

- Fort Purbrook
- The source of the River Itchen
- Tidley Hill
- Watership Down
- Ladle Hill and Iron Age hillfort and SSSI
- Pilot Hill and Dean Hill
- Walbury Hill and the Iron Age hillfort of Walbury Camp
- The start of the Test Way

== Map ==
These maps show the footpath in relation to nearby major roads. Maps are not on the same scale.

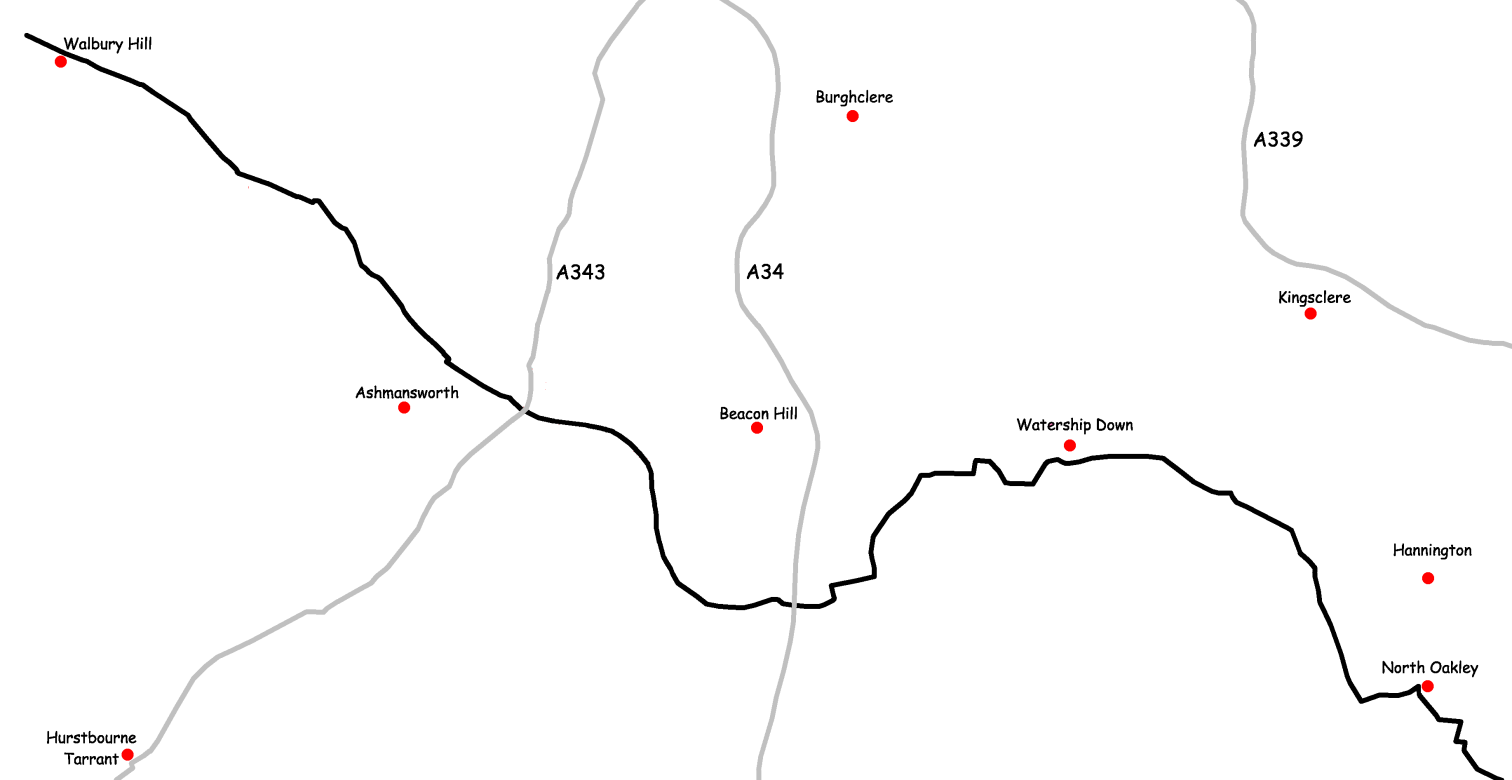
Walbury to North Oakley

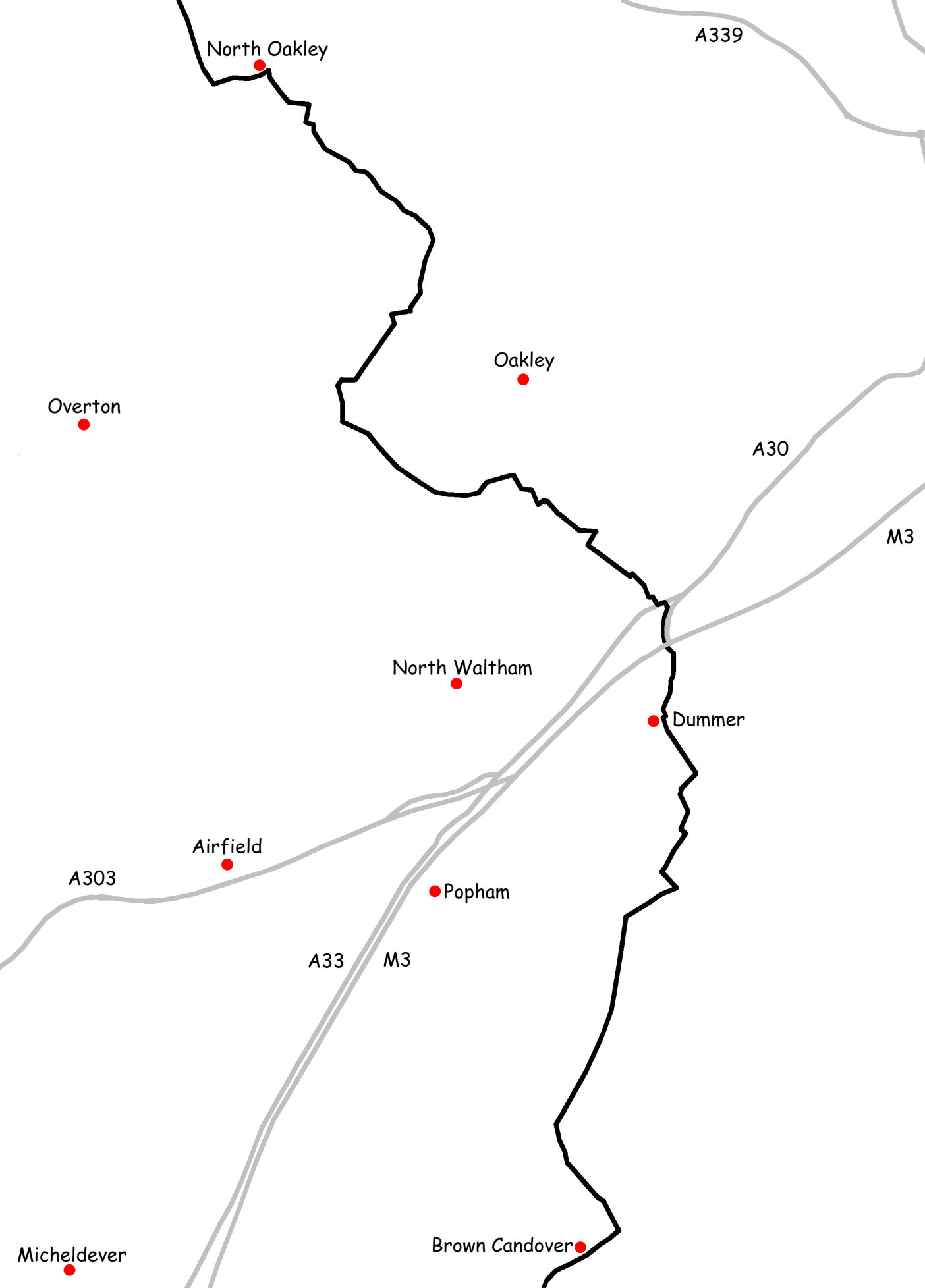
North Oakley to Brown Candover

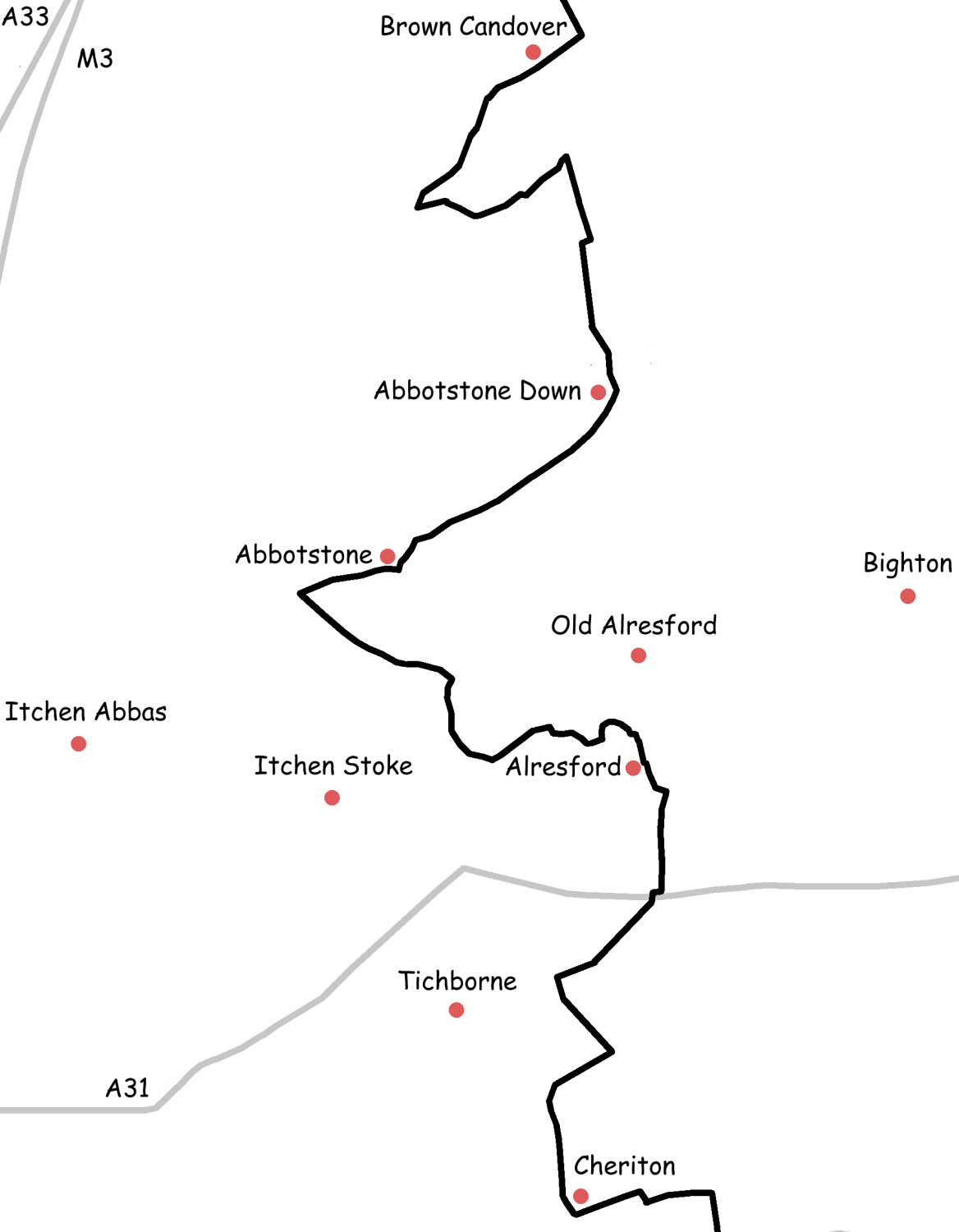
Brown Candover to Cheriton

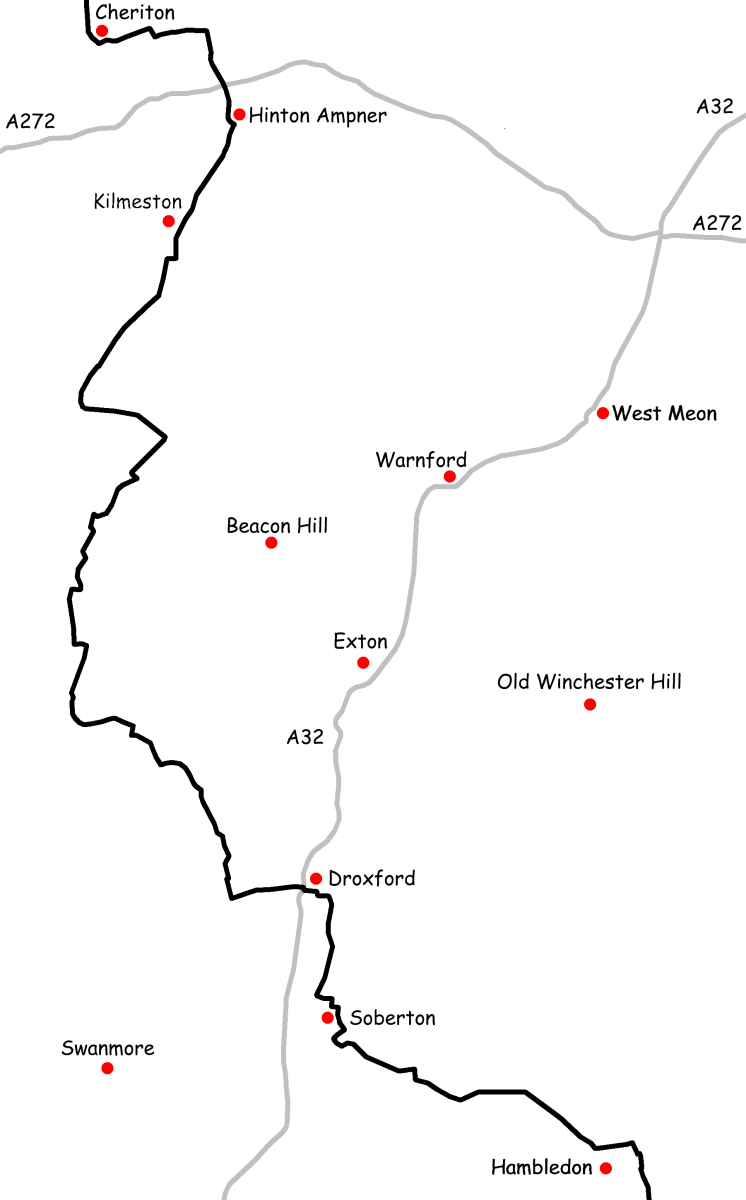
Cheriton to Hambledon

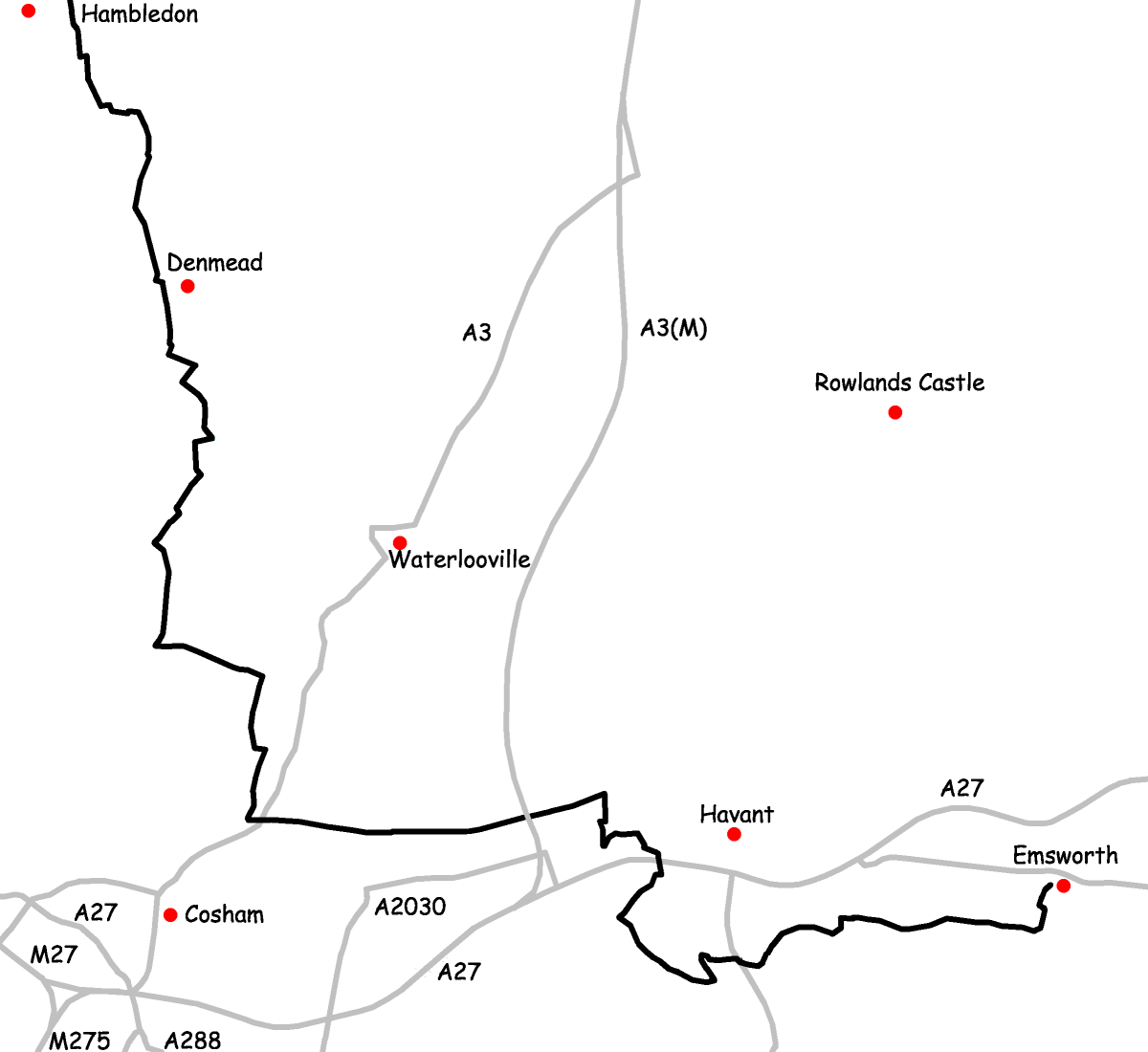
Hambledon to Emsworth

== See also ==
- Long-distance footpaths in the UK
- North Wessex Downs Area of Outstanding Natural Beauty
