= Hog's Hole =

Grassland in Berkshire, England

- Site of Special Scientific Interest
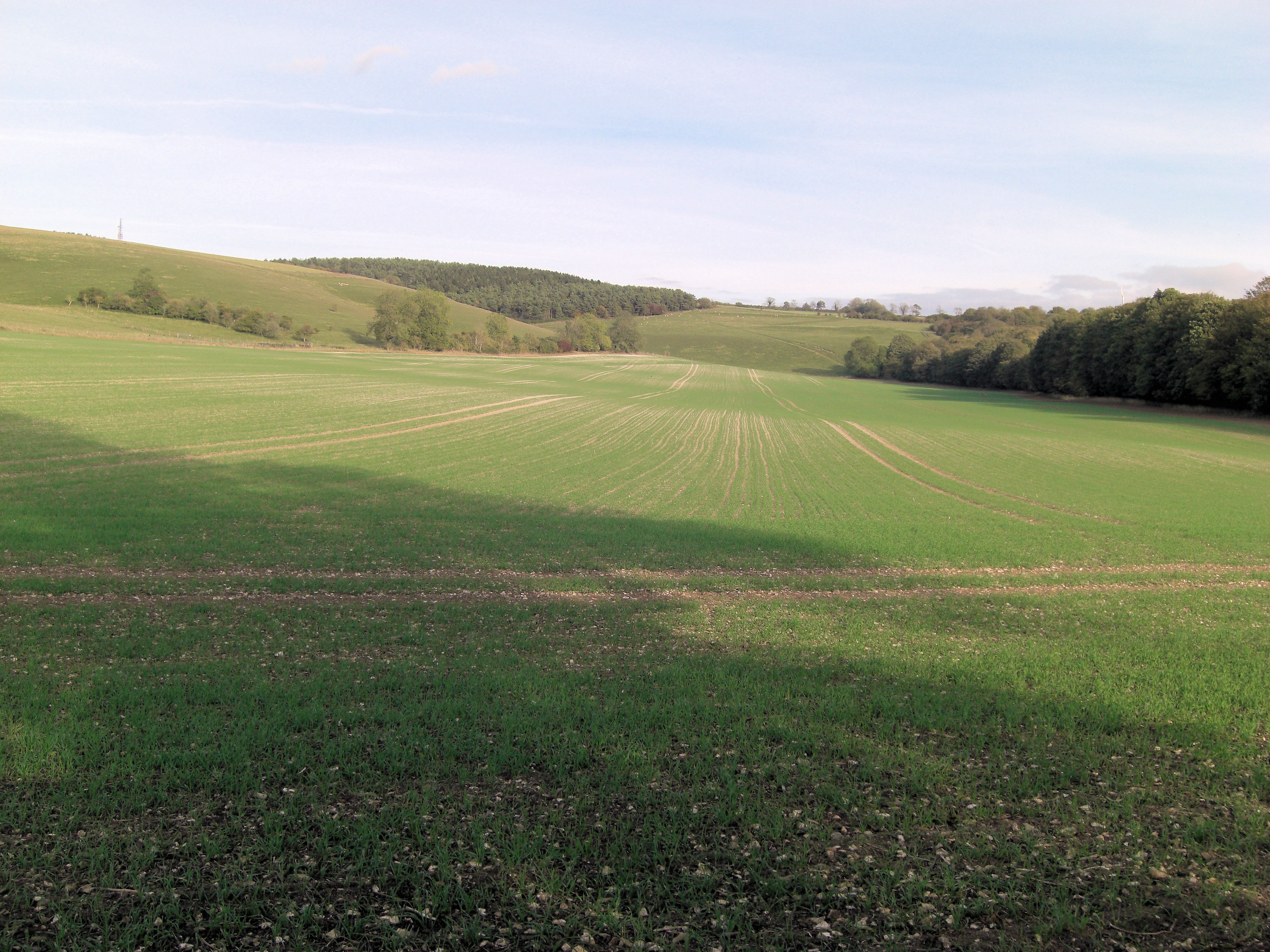

- Location within Berkshire
- Location of Hog's Hole.
- Area of search: Berkshire
- Grid reference: SU 378 597
- Coordinates: 51.334°N 1.459°W
- Interest: Biological
- Area: 23.7 hectares (59 acres)
- Notification date: 1988
- Location map: Magic Map

Hog's Hole is a 23.7-hectare (59-acre) biological Site of Special Scientific Interest in the civil parish of Combe in the English county of Berkshire.

== Geography ==
Hog's Hole is one of three nationally important chalk grassland sites that lie within the North Wessex Downs along with Rushmore and Conholt Downs (SSSI) and part of Inkpen and Walbury Hills (SSSI).

Hog's Hole consists of a dry valley, or combe, cut in the Middle and Upper Chalk. The steep east and west-facing valley sides support only thin rendzina soils, an unusual feature being lines of bare chalk and flint scree. The valley opens out in its southern part, the remainder of the site consisting of a moderately steep and undulating south-facing slope and a steep west-facing slope rising to a plateau area.

== History ==
The site has been predominantly used for grazing sheep.

== Fauna ==
The site has the following Fauna:

=== Birds ===
- Willow warbler
- Garden warbler
- Lesser whitethroat
- Long-tailed tit
- Yellowhammer

== Flora ==
The site has the following Flora:

=== Trees ===
- Crataegus
- elder
- Ligustrum vulgare
- Prunus spinosa
- Sycamore
- Malus
- Viburnum lantana
- Ash
- Whitebeam

=== Plants ===
- Festuca ovina
- Avenula pratensis
- Cirsium acaule
- Asperula cynanchica
- Festuca rubra
- Briza media
- Koeleria macrantha
- Avenula pubescens
- Holcus lanatus
- Trisetum flavescens
- Carex flacca
- Hieracium pilosella
- Leontodon hispidus
- Galium verum
- Clinopodium vulgare
- Common eyebright
- Sanguisorba minor
- Polygala vulgaris
- Plantago media
- Hippocrepis comosa
- Helianthemum nummularium
- Ranunculus bulbosus
- Viola hirta
- Gentianella amarella
- Carduus nutans
- Dactylorhiza fuchsii
- Carex caryophyllea
- Thymus praecox
- Thymus pulegioides
- Linum catharticum
- Arenaria serpyllifolia
- Silene dioica
- Geum urbanum
- Geranium robertianum
- Circaea lutetiana
- Bromus erectus
- Arrhenatherum elatius
- Lolium perenne
- Trifolium repens
- Urtica dioica
