= Walbury Hill =

Hill in, and highest point of, the English county of Berkshire

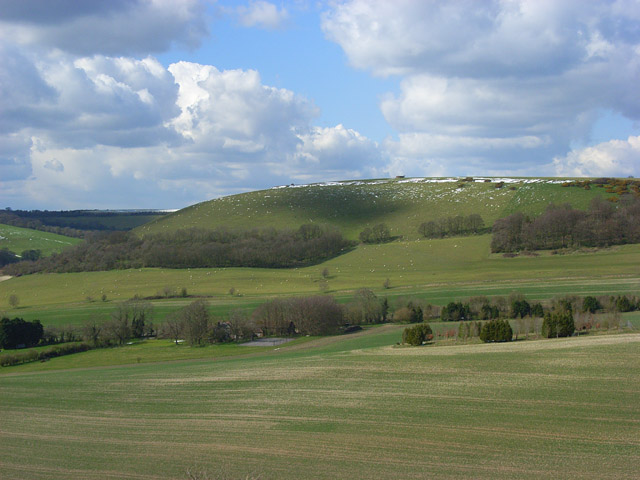
- Walbury Hill, seen from the south-east

Highest point
- Elevation: 297 m (974 ft)
- Prominence: c. 188 metres (617 ft)
- Parent peak: Beacon Batch
- Listing: Marilyn, County Top, Hardy
- Coordinates: 51°21′08″N 1°27′57″W

Geography
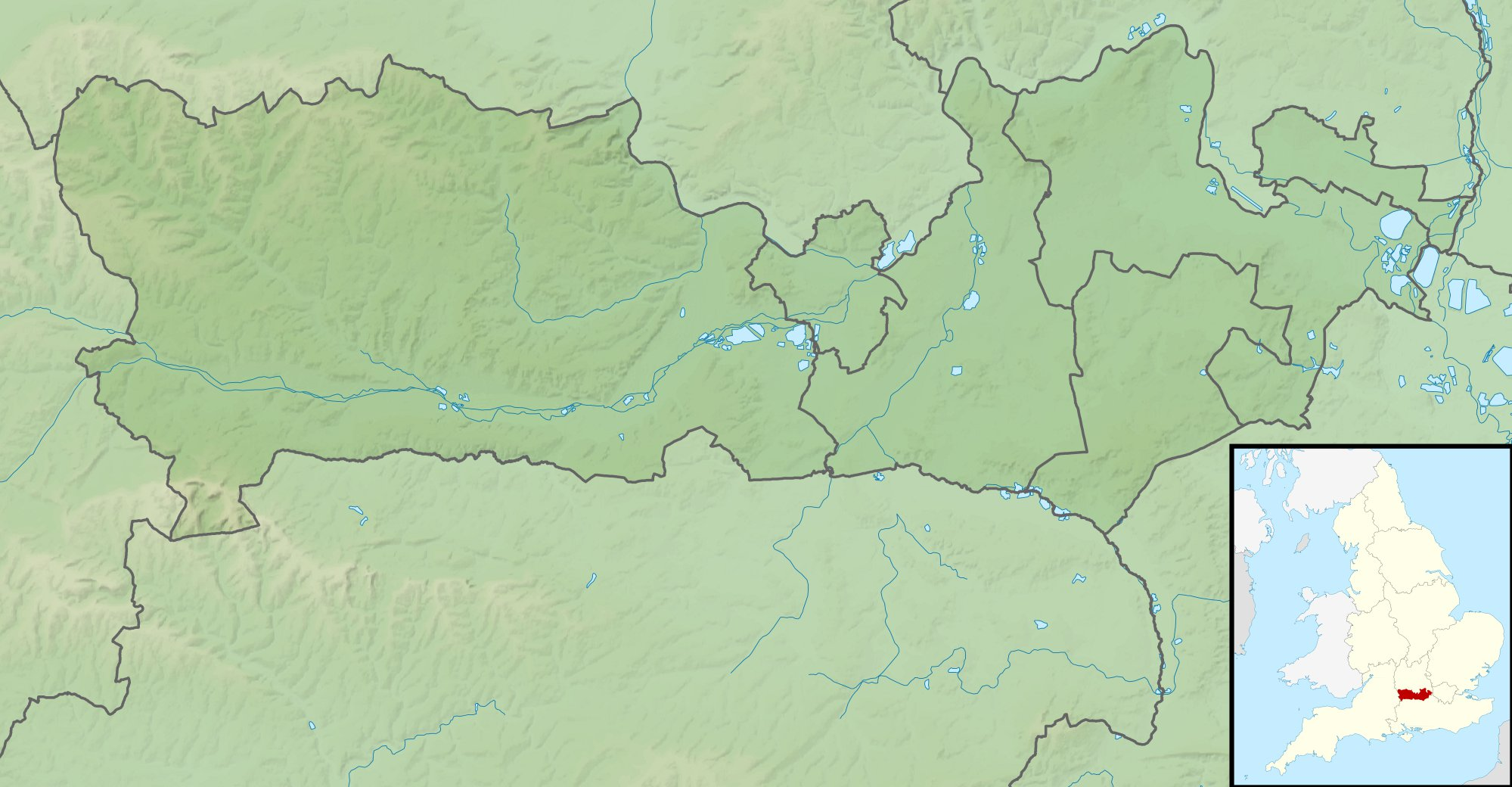
- Location within Berkshire
- Location: Berkshire, England
- Parent range: North Hampshire Downs
- OS grid: SU373616
- Topo map: OS Landranger 174

Walbury Hill is a summit of the North Wessex Downs in Berkshire, England. With an elevation of 297 metres (974 ft), it is the highest natural point in South East England. (Note: Walbury Hill is 3 metres (10 ft) higher than Leith Hill in Surrey.) On the hill's summit is the Iron Age hill fort of Walbury Camp, whilst the flanks of the hill lie within the Inkpen and Walbury Hills SSSI. The hill is one of three nationally important chalk wild grasslands in the North Wessex Downs, the others being in the Rushmore and Conholt Downs SSSI and the Hog's Hole SSSI. The summit of the hill is marked by a triangulation pillar, but lies on private land with no public access, although public access is available to the north of the summit via a byway.

Walbury Hill lies on the north-facing ridgeline of the North Hampshire Downs section of the North Wessex Downs, flanked to the west by Inkpen Hill and to the east by Combe Hill and Pilot Hill. Combe Gibbet stands to the west on Gallows Down between Walbury and Inkpen Hills. The town of Hungerford is around seven kilometres (4 1/2 mi) northwest.

The hill is accessible by minor roads at both its western and eastern sides, and there are car parks at the closest point of approach of each road. There is no paved road across the hill between these two points, but a byway open to all traffic connects them, passing some 200 metres (660 ft) north of the summit. The westerly car park at Walbury Hill is the starting point for both the Test Way and the Wayfarer's Walk long distance footpaths. The Wayfarer's Walk utilises the byway across the hill, before continuing south and east to Emsworth in Hampshire. The Test Way heads in the opposite direction, via Combe Gibbet and Inkpen Hill, before turning south to Eling in Hampshire.

The hill lies within the civil parishes of Combe (which includes the summit), Inkpen and West Woodhay, all of which are within the unitary authority area of West Berkshire and the ceremonial county of Berkshire. (Note: The summit of Walbury Hill became part of Berkshire when the civil parish of Combe was transferred from Hampshire in 1895. Pilot Hill, two miles (three kilometres) southeast, is now the highest point in Hampshire.) It forms part of the Kirby House estate, owned by the Astor family.

Before the use of satellites was commonplace, Walbury Hill was occasionally used by the BBC as a temporary relay station during events at Newbury Racecourse. There is a small low-level circular brick building, approximately 6 feet (1.8 metres) high, on the south side of the hill, which appears to be a disused reservoir.

Walbury Hill is the furthest point visible from The Shard in London.

Thomas Hardy mentions Walbury Hill, which he calls “Ingpen Beacon”, in his poem ‘Wessex Heights”.

== Gallery ==
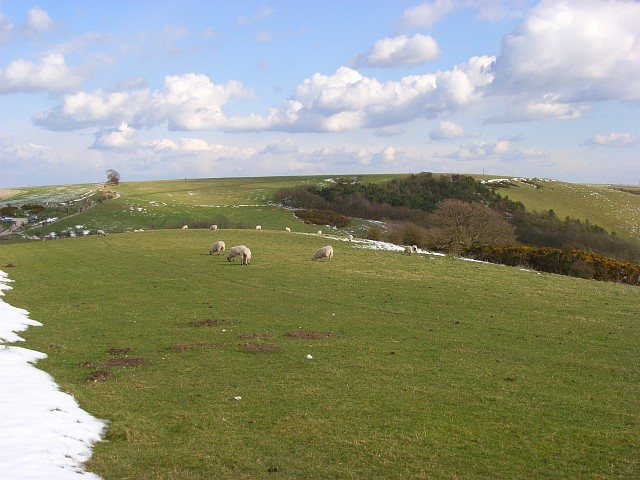
View of Walbury Hill from Combe Gibbet to the west

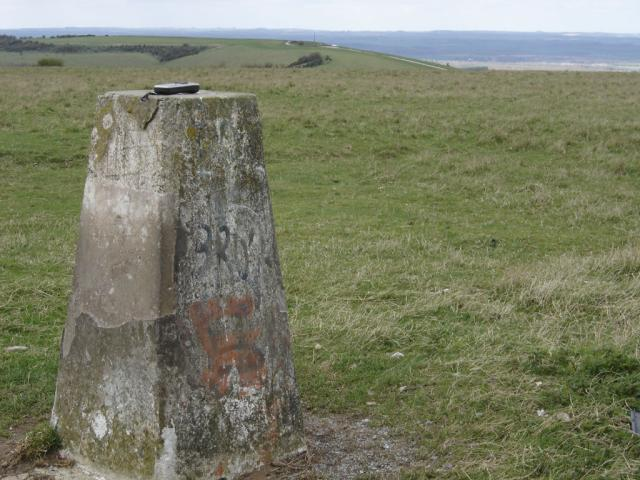
The triangulation pillar, looking west towards Coombe Gibbet

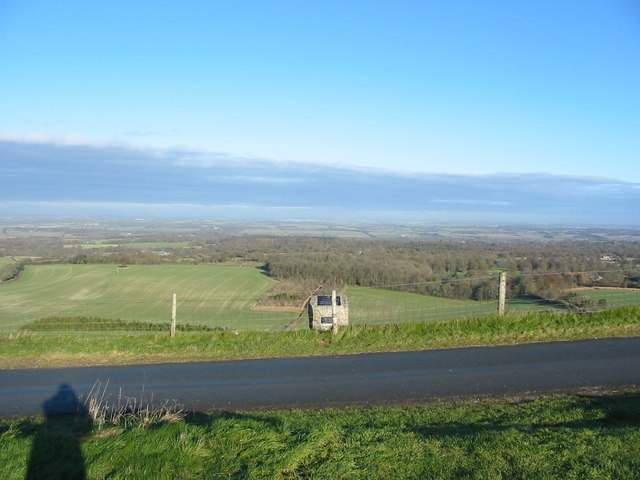
View looking north from Walbury Hill Car Park

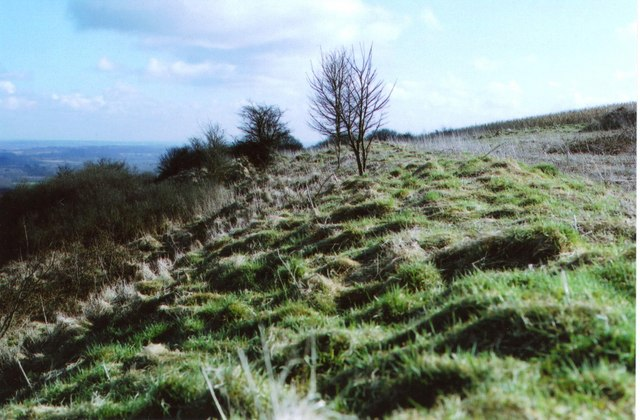
The remains of the hill fort
