= Combe Gibbet =

Combe Gibbet and Long Barrow
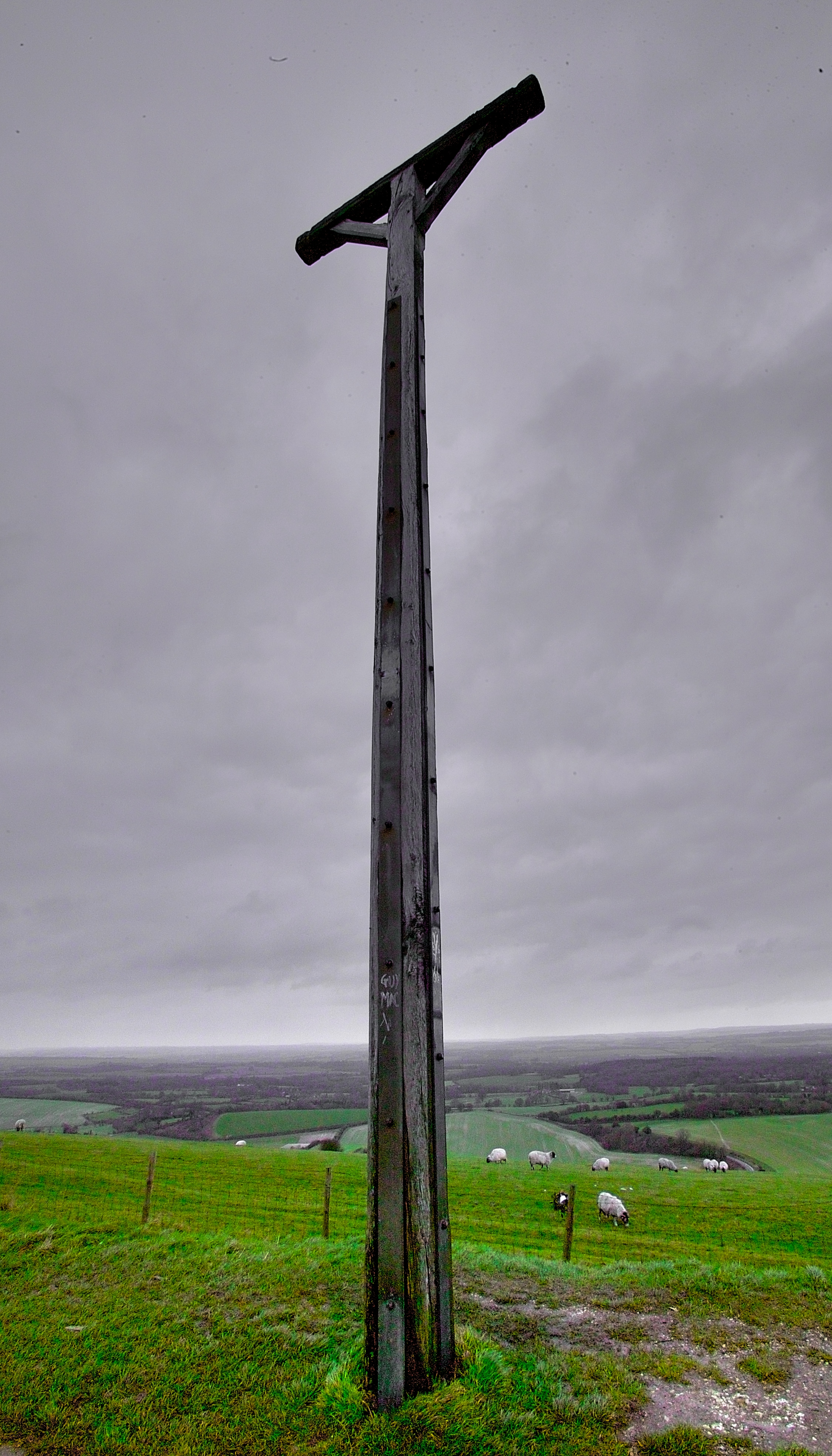
- The 1992 replica gibbet, seen in 2007

- Location within Berkshire
- 51.35594°N 1.48439°W
- Type: Gibbet and Long barrow
- Location: Combe, Berkshire
- OS grid reference: SU360620

History
- Built: 1676
- Rebuilt: 1992

Scheduled monument
- Official name: Long barrow at Combe Gibbet, Gallows Down.
- Designated: 26 August 1924
- Reference no.: 1013198

Combe Gibbet is a gibbet at the top of Gallows Down, near the village and just within the civil parish of Combe in Berkshire (formerly Hampshire), England.

== Location ==
The gibbet is located at grid reference SU360620, on the Test Way close to the Berkshire-Hampshire border, it is named after the village of Combe, but it is also close to Inkpen. The nearest sizeable town is Newbury in Berkshire. It is built on top of a long barrow known as the Inkpen long barrow. The long barrow is 60 m long and 22 m wide, and is a Scheduled Monument. Walbury Hill (the highest point in South East England) is a little further east.

== History ==
It was erected in 1676 for the purpose of gibbeting the bodies of George Broomham and Dorothy Newman and has only ever been used for them. The gibbet was placed in such a prominent location as a warning, to deter others from committing crimes.

Broomham and Newman were having an affair and were hanged for murdering Broomham's wife Martha, and their son Robert after they discovered them together on the downs. Unfortunately for the lovers, the murder was witnessed by "Mad Thomas", who managed to convey what he had seen to the authorities. The pair were hanged in Winchester before being gibbeted at Combe.

=== As a landmark ===
After the 1676 gibbet rotted, a total of 7 replica gibbets have stood in its place, the most recent having been erected in 1992. Over the years, two versions of the gibbet post have been cut down in protest against capital punishment. One version was struck by lightning.

In June 1970, the Newbury Weekly News reported that an effigy bearing political posters had been hung up on the gibbet, and that Labour Party candidate Tim Sims had come to Combe Gibbet to place flowers there, stating that this action was "in memory of the past injustice of a feudal system, brought to an end by a compassionate society and the never-ending fight by the common man for equality". In 2022, The Guardian reported that a rainbow Pride flag had flown from the post.

Today, local community attachment to the gibbet post is strong. The gibbet post marks the start of a scenic 16-mile (26 km) off-road race to Overton organised by the Overton Harriers and Athletic Club, which typically occurs in late March or early April of each year. The race takes in the highest hill in the South East of England, Walbury Hill; the highest in Hampshire, Pilot Hill; as well as Ladle Hill and the edge of Watership Down before entering Overton near the source of the River Test.

== Gallery ==
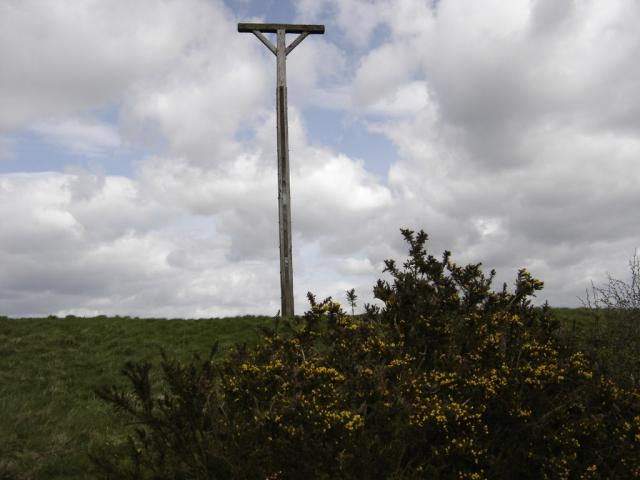
The Gibbet

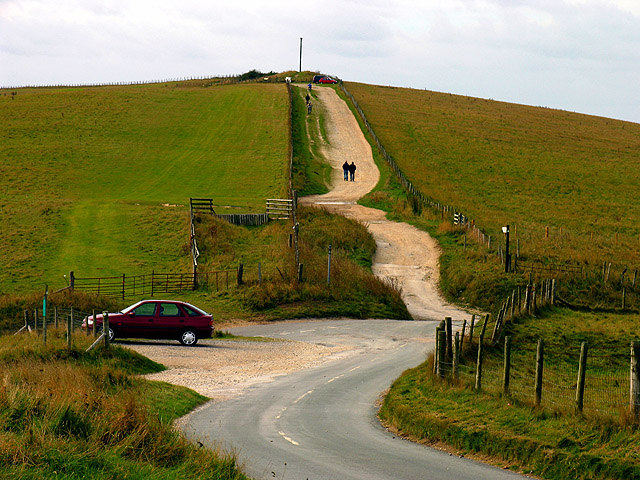
Looking up at Combe Gibbet from the East

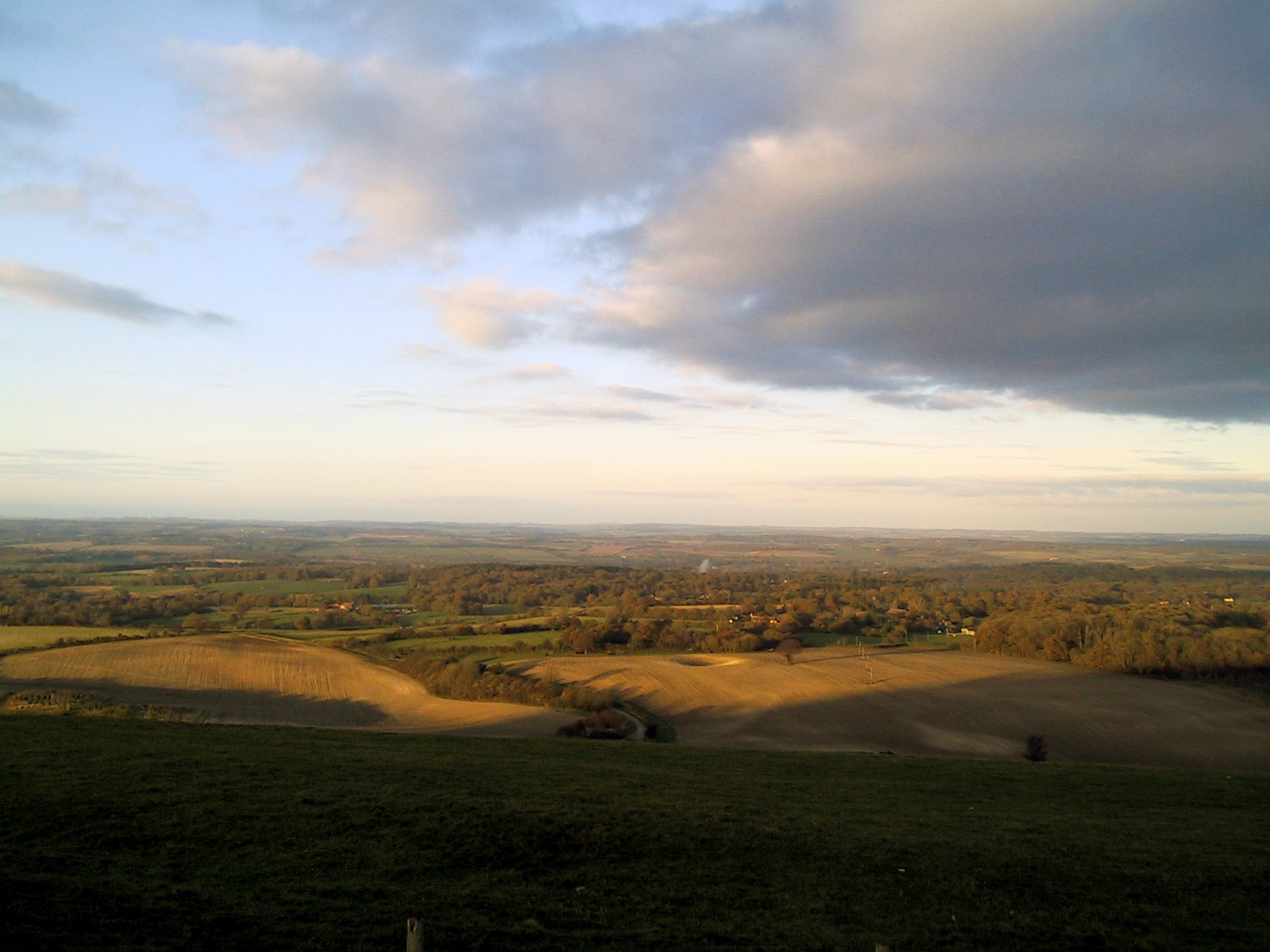
View from Combe Gibbet, looking north over the Kennet Valley

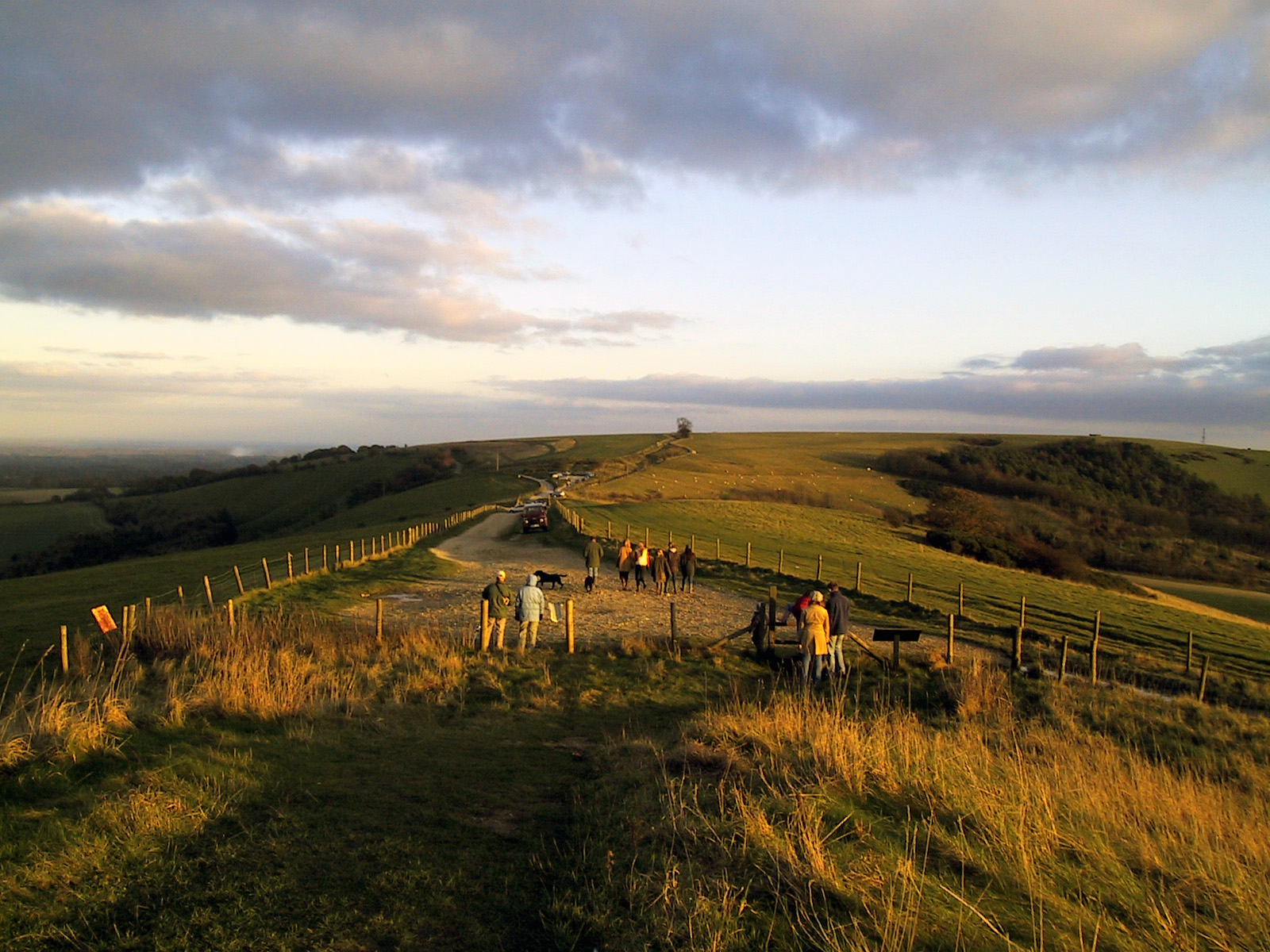
View from Combe Gibbet, looking east towards Walbury Hill

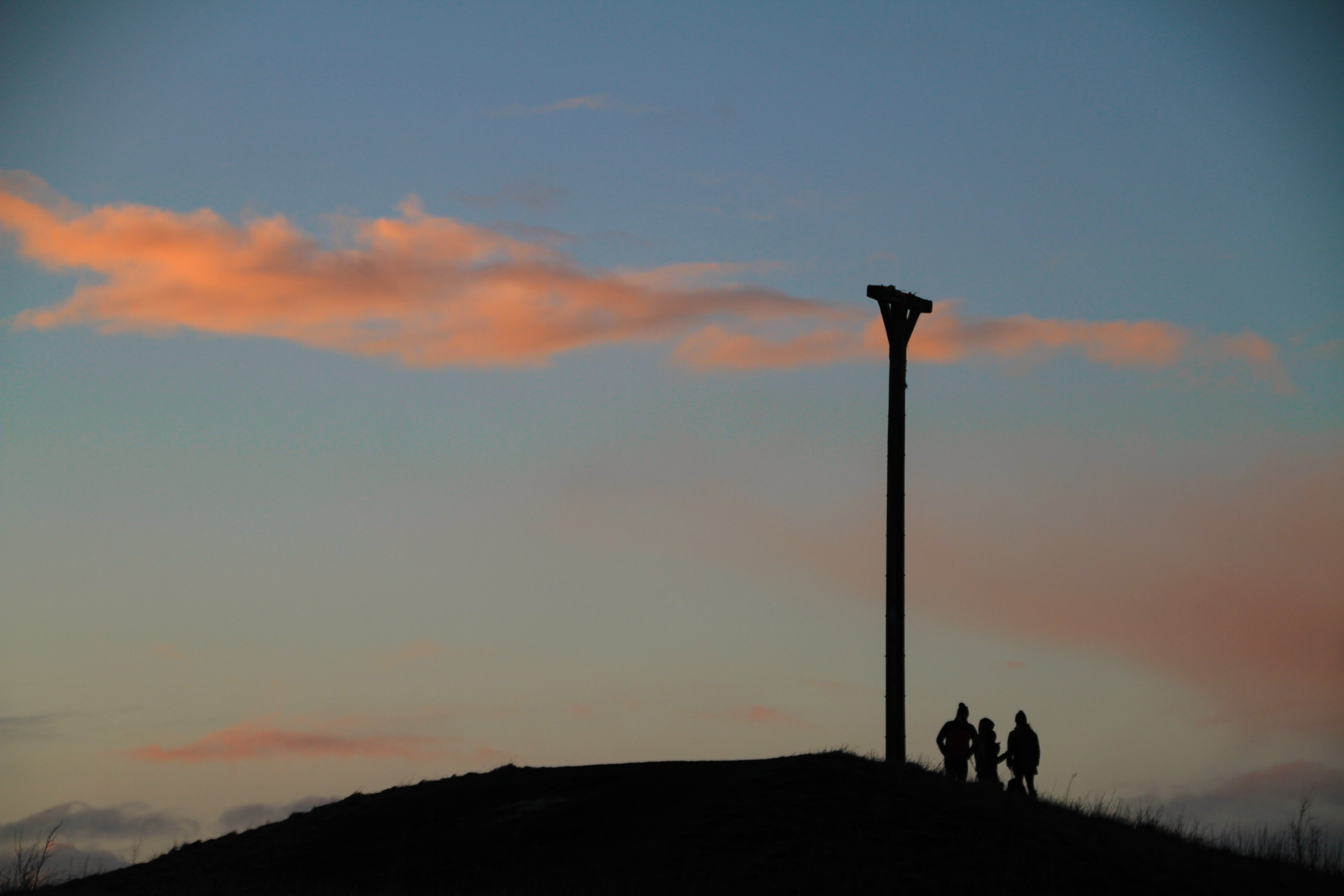
The Gibbet, seen at sunset
