= Combe, Berkshire =

Village in Berkshire, England

Coordinates: 51°20′44″N 1°28′10″W

Combe
- Village and civil parish
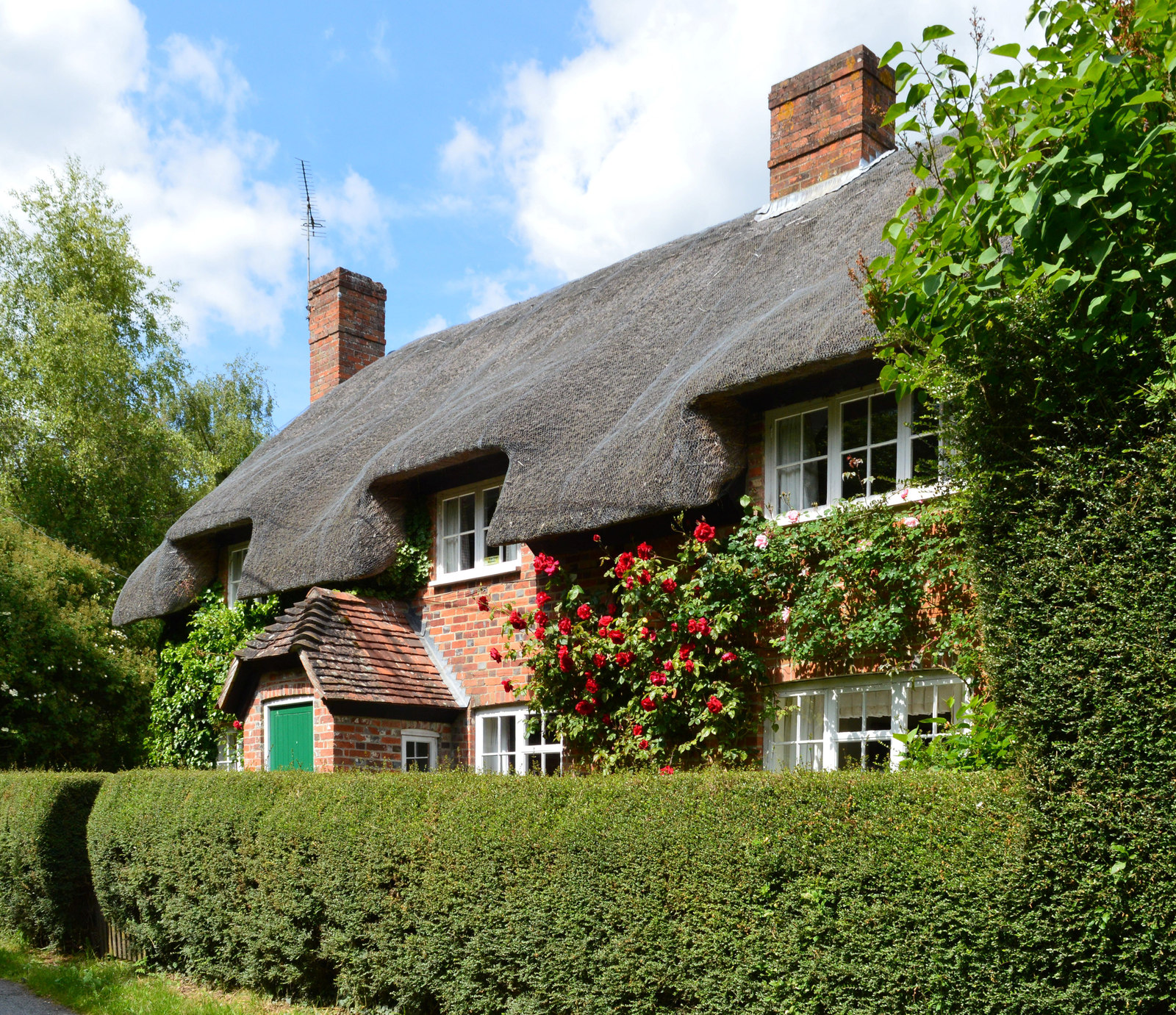
- Thatched cottage in Combe

- Location within Berkshire
- Population: 38 (2001)
- OS grid reference: SU370608
- Civil parish: Combe
- Unitary authority: West Berkshire
- Ceremonial county: Berkshire
- Region: South East
- Country: England
- Sovereign state: United Kingdom
- Post town: HUNGERFORD
- Postcode district: RG17
- Dialling code: 01488
- Police: Thames Valley
- Fire: Royal Berkshire
- Ambulance: South Central
- UK Parliament: Newbury

Combe is a village and civil parish in the English county of Berkshire. The parish is situated on the top of the North Hampshire Downs near Walbury Hill and Combe Gibbet, overlooking the village of Inkpen and the valley of the River Kennet. In Walbury Hill, it includes the highest natural point in South East England.

Administratively, the civil parish lies within the unitary authority area of West Berkshire, and within the ceremonial county of Berkshire. Historically part of Hampshire, Combe was transferred to Berkshire in 1895.

== History ==
Neolithic people in this part of Europe constructed communal long barrows to bury their important dead and one is a scheduled monument in the civil parish beneath Gibbet Hill's peak. Both male and female bodies of the dead may have been left in the open to be reduced to skeletons by carrion before being collected and buried. In many cases the corpses were carefully assembled with the head to the south, men facing east, women facing west. It is unknown whether this was the case in the so-called Inkpen long barrow (named after the village to the north but within Combe), though it is on an east–west alignment.

== St Swithun's Church ==
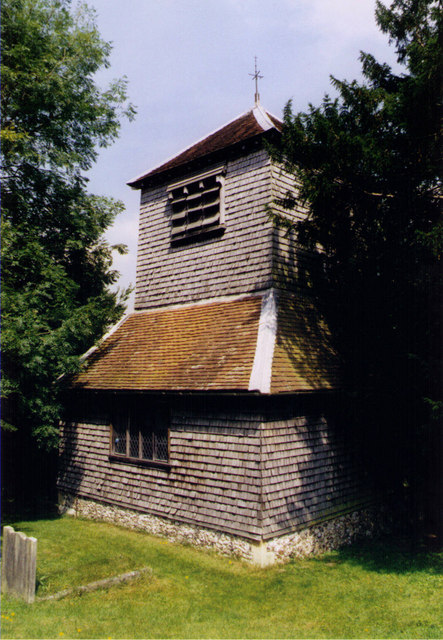
St Swithun's Church, Combe

The Church of England parish church of Saint Swithun is Norman, with the nave dating from the second half of the 12th century. The interior has additions from the 17th century, such as the chancel roof. The bell tower is made of wood on flint, and the bell chamber above holds three bells; one pre-reformation, one dated 1616 and one dated 1831. The church is a Grade I listed building.

== Geography ==
Combe Hill forms part of the same escarpment as the larger Walbury Hill which is mostly in Combe, in the North Wessex Downs, the highest point in southeast England. Combe has a Site of Special Scientific Interest (SSSI) just to the south west of the village, called Combe Wood and Linkenholt Hanging. The civil parish includes the summits of Walbury Hill and Combe Hill, and parts of Inkpen Hill and Pilot Hill. Combe Gibbet stands on Gallows Down, in the civil parish between Inkpen and Walbury Hills.
