= Anvilles =

Hamlet in Berkshire, England

Coordinates: 51.38°N 01.51°W

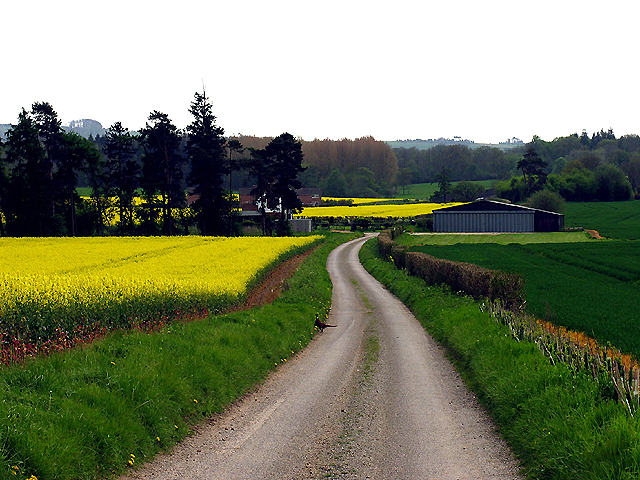
- Anvilles near Hungerford. This view is of Anvilles from the north east looking south west and is situated in the south eastern corner of the north western quadrant of the grid square.

- Location within Berkshire
- OS grid reference: SU3465
- Shire county: Berkshire
- Region: South East
- Country: England
- Sovereign state: United Kingdom
- Police: Thames Valley
- Fire: Royal Berkshire
- Ambulance: South Central

Anvilles is a hamlet in the English county of Berkshire, and within the civil parish of Inkpen (formerly in Kintbury).

== See also ==
- Civil parish
