= Test Way =

44-mile footpath in southern England

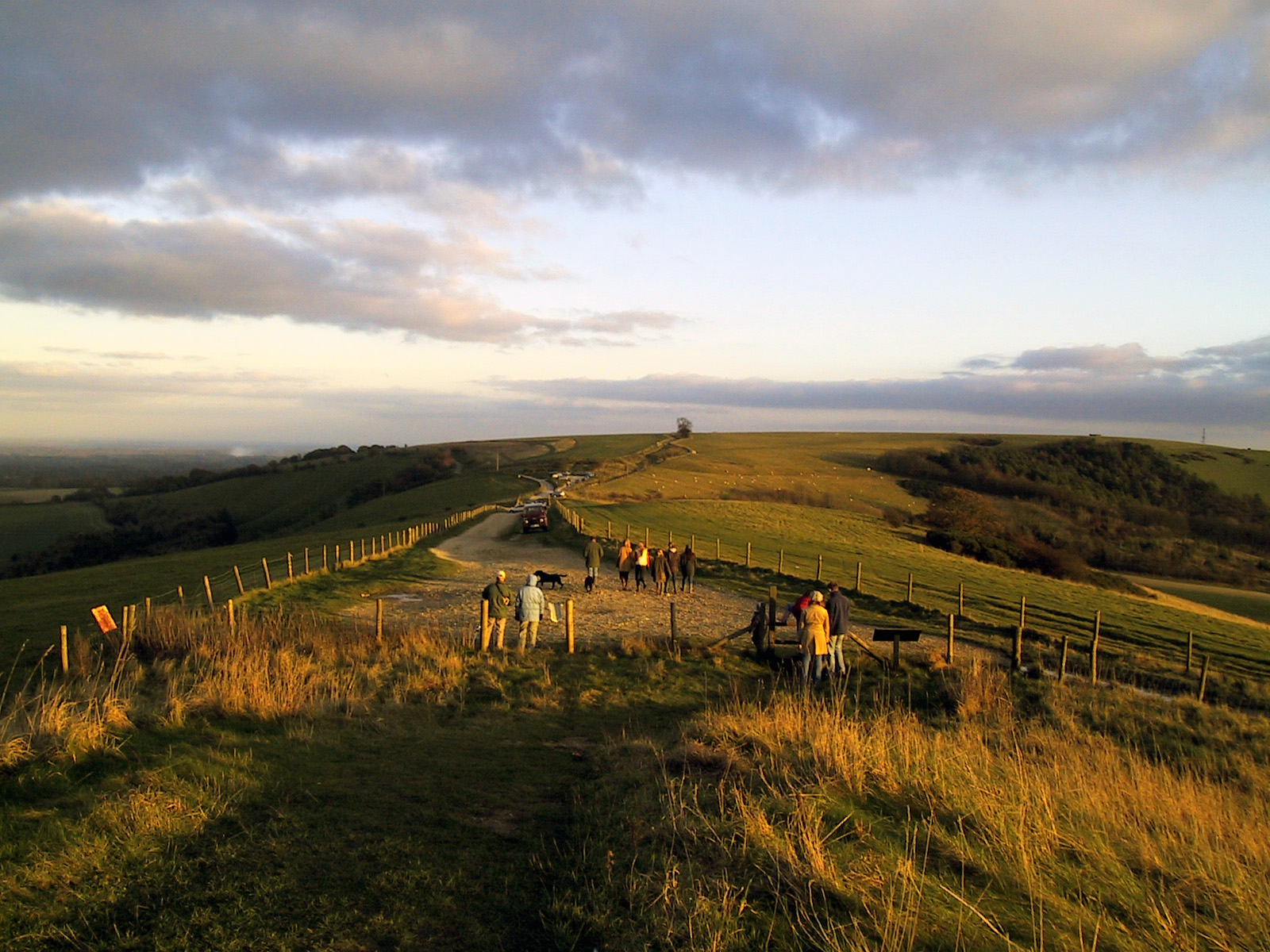
- The Test Way near Combe Gibbet, Berkshire
- Length: 44 mi (71 km)
- Location: Hampshire, England
- Trailheads: Inkpen Hill in West Berkshire 51.355487°N 1.491251°W; Eling in Hampshire 50.912°N 1.4807°W
- Use: Hiking
- Season: All year
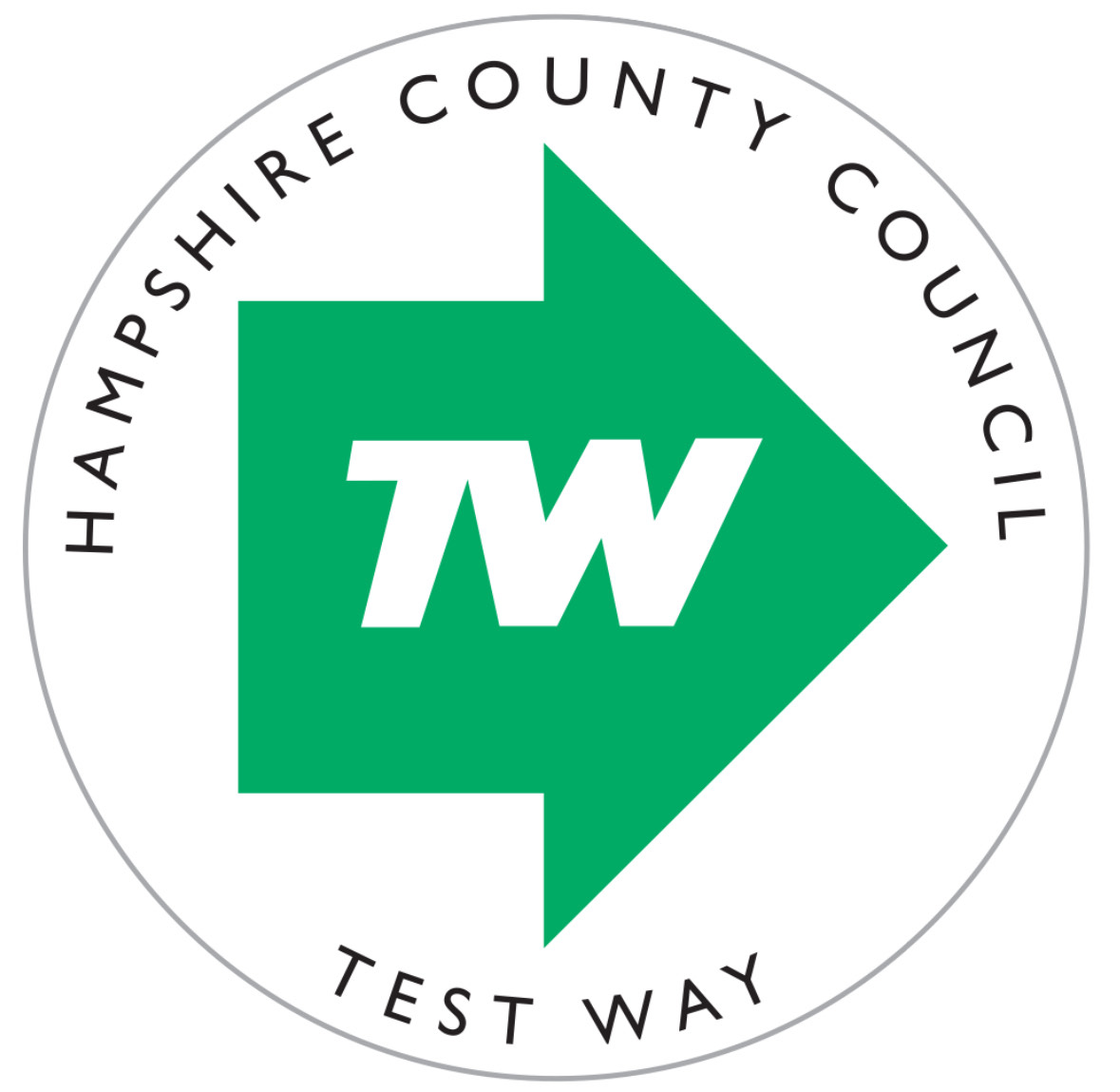
- Waymark
- Website: Official website

Trail map
- The route of the Test Way.

The Test Way is a 44-mile (71 km) long-distance footpath in England from Walbury Hill in West Berkshire to Eling in Hampshire, which follows much of the course of the River Test.

The northern end of the footpath starts in the car park on Walbury Hill. It passes through the towns of Romsey and Totton and the villages of Linkenholt, Ibthorpe, Hurstbourne Tarrant, St Mary Bourne, Longparish, Forton, Wherwell, Chilbolton, Stockbridge, Horsebridge and Mottisfont. The southern end of the footpath is at Eling Quay.

The trail also passes alongside Horsebridge railway station. Much of the route between Kimbridge and Chilbolton follows the route of the former Andover and Redbridge Railway.

The entire route is waymarked by metal and plastic disks found attached to wooden and metal posts, trees and street furniture. There are several wooden 'finger' signs along the route that count down the number of miles along the footpath in both directions.

This route is shown as a series of green diamonds on Ordnance Survey 1:25,000 maps and as a series of red diamonds on Ordnance Survey 1:50,000 maps

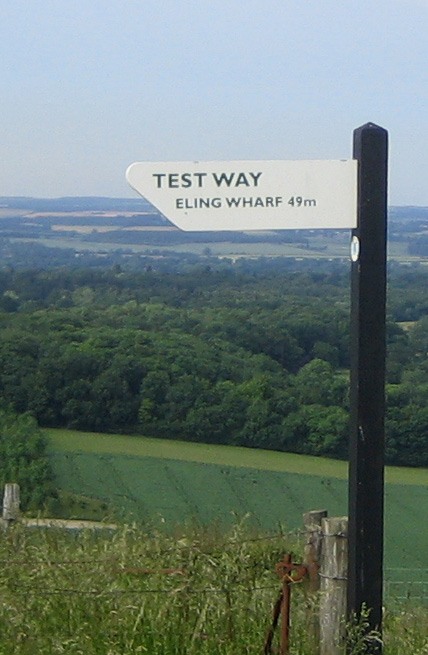
The Test Way.

== Places of interest ==
The following places of interest and hills can be found along the length of the Test Way, listed from Walbury Hill:

- Combe Gibbet
- Ham Hill
- Hart Hill Down
- Wallop Hill Down
- Mottisfont Abbey
- Roke Manor
- Lower Test nature reserve

== The route ==
These maps show the footpath in relation to nearby major roads. Maps are not on the same scale.

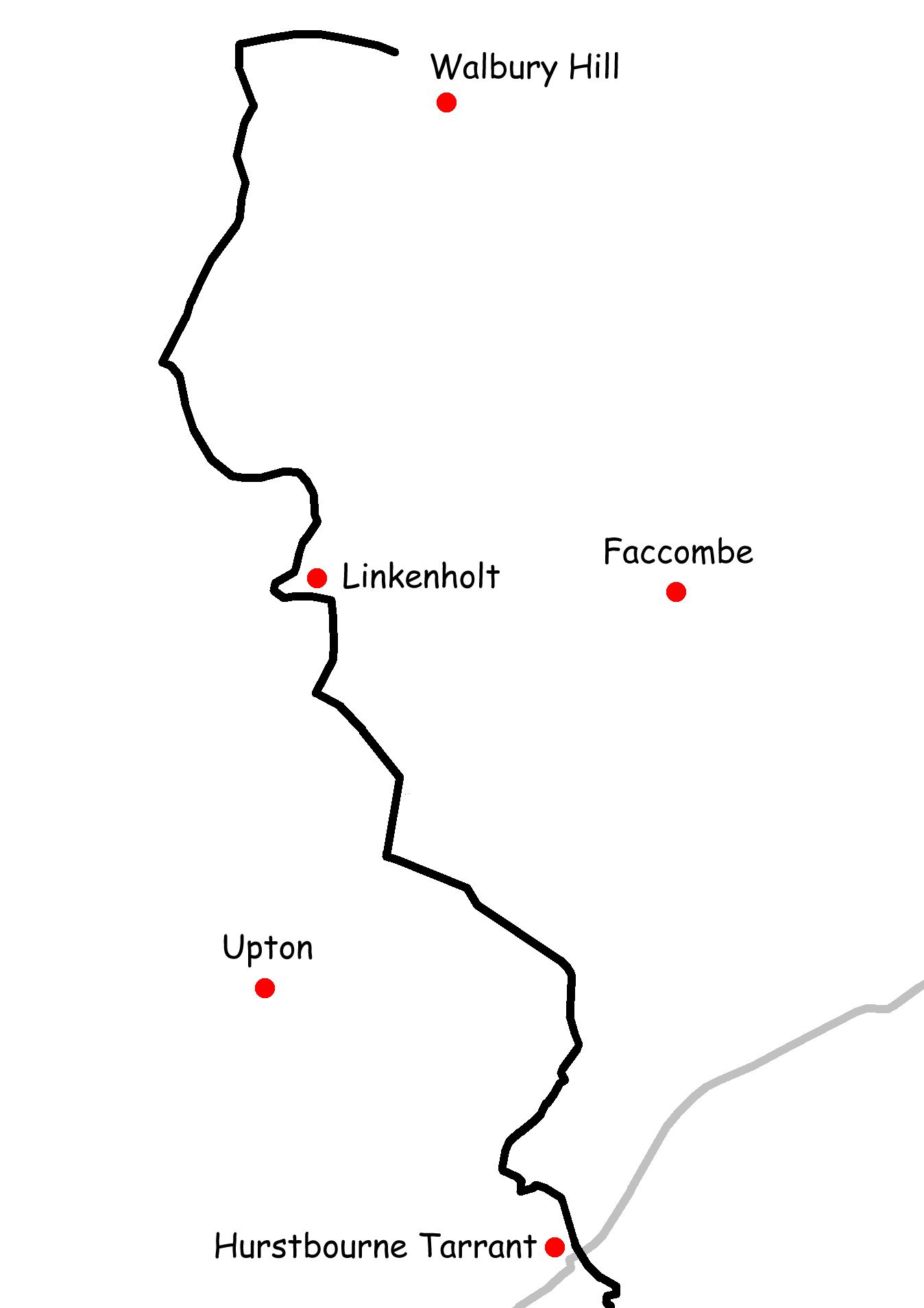
Walbury Hill to Hurstbourne Tarrant

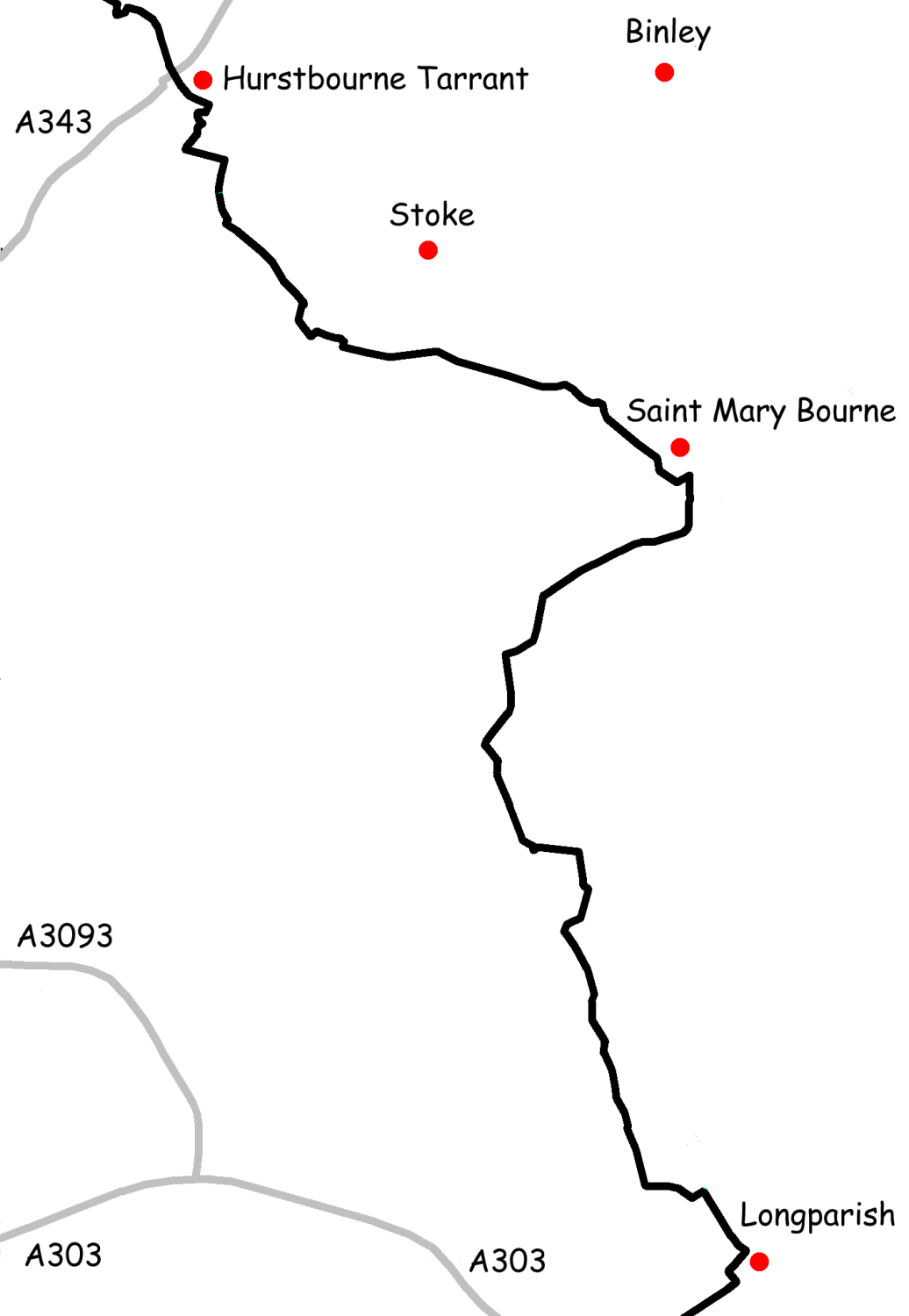
Hurstbourne Tarrant to Longparish

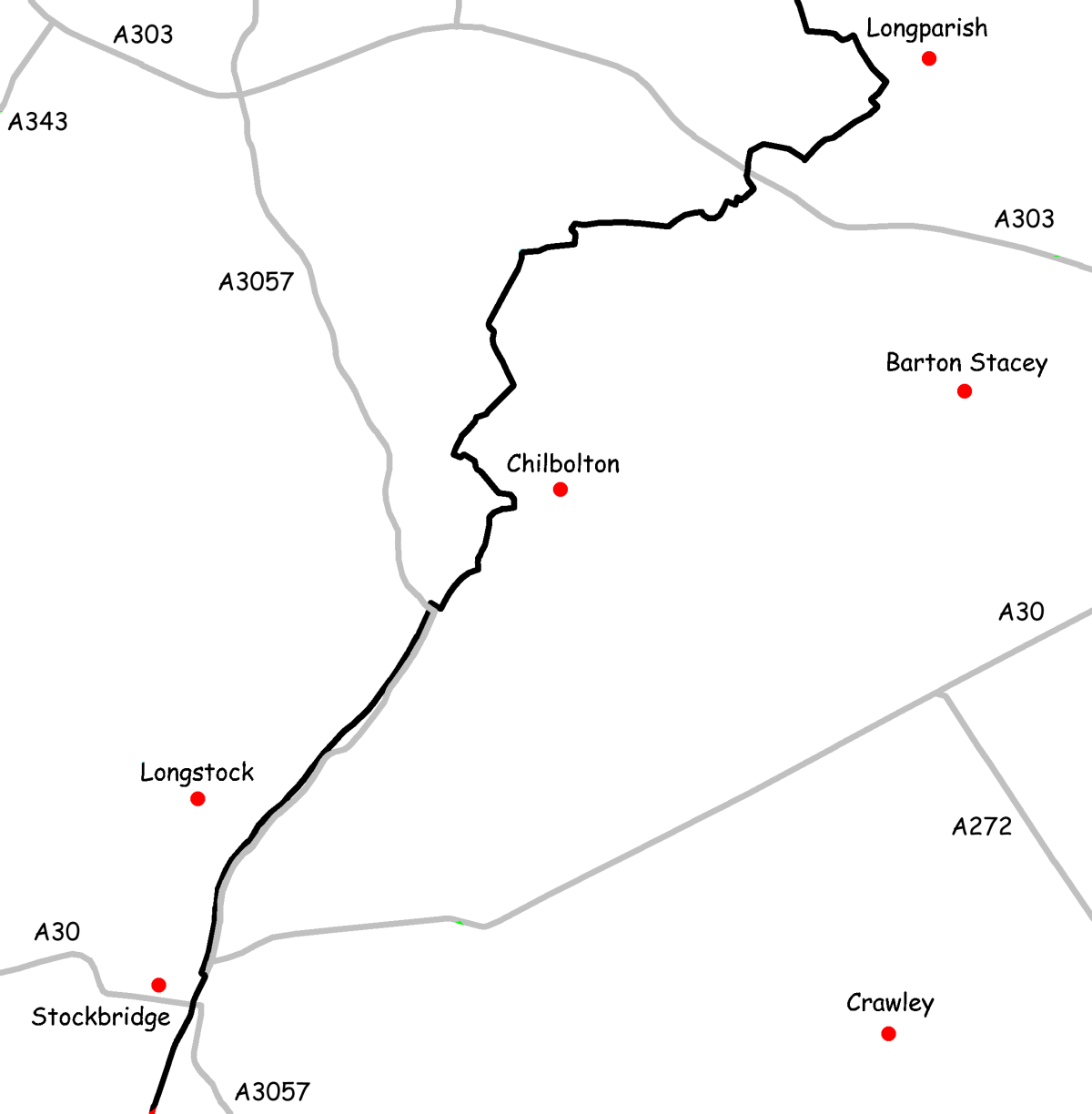
Longparish to Stockbridge

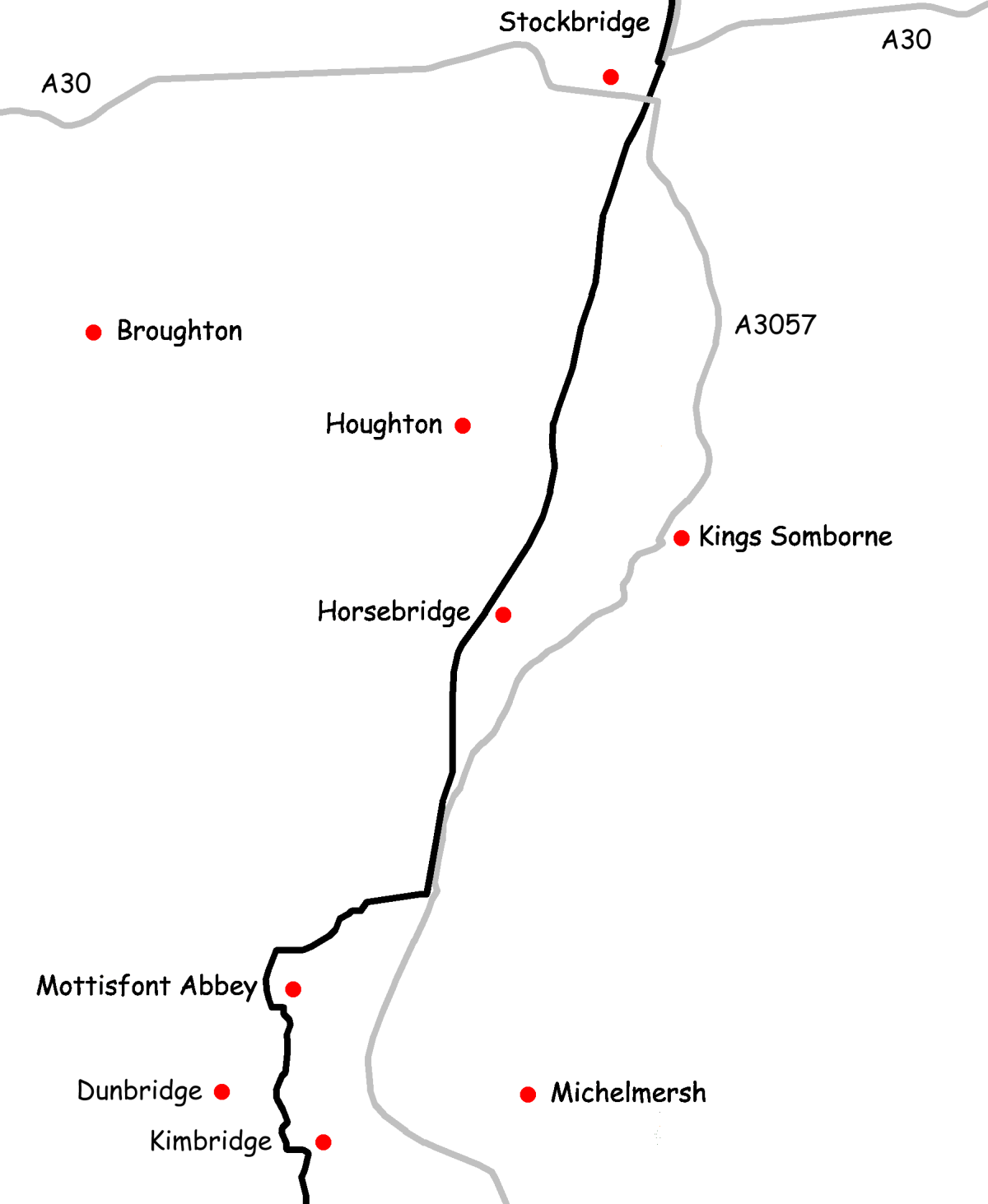
Stockbridge to Kimbridge

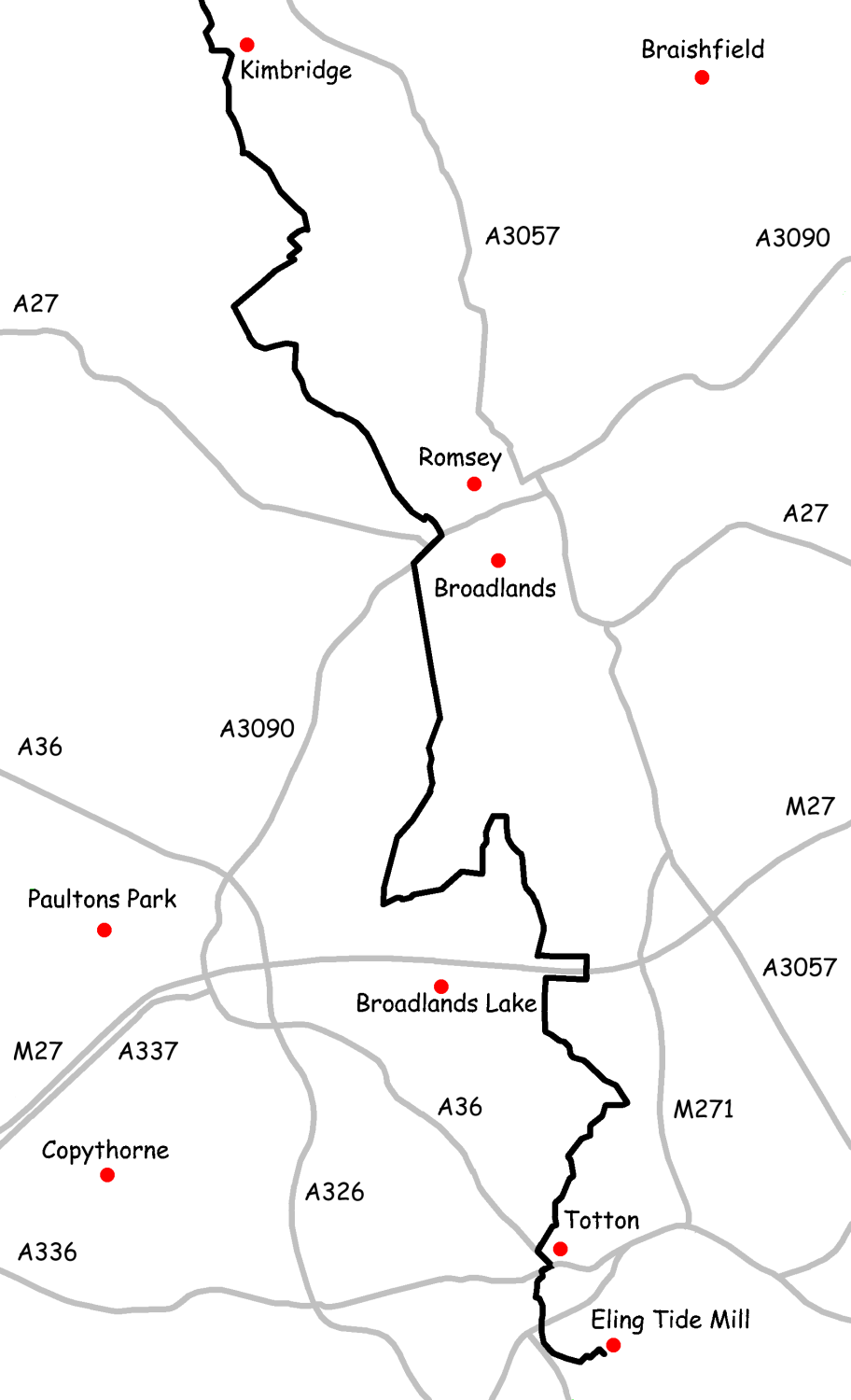
Kimbridge to Eling

== See also ==
- Long-distance footpaths in the UK
- North Wessex Downs Area of Outstanding Natural Beauty
- Test Way Tales (blog about walking The Test Way)
