= Pilot Hill, Hampshire =

Hill in Hampshire, England

Pilot Hill
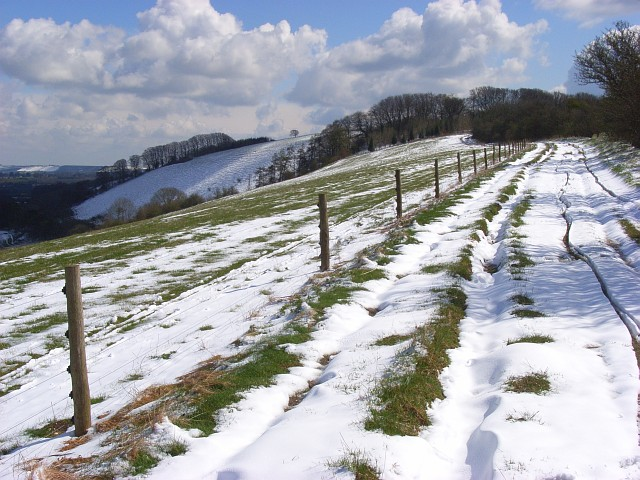
- On the Wayfarer's Walk as it approaches Pilot Hill.

Highest point
- Elevation: 286 m (938 ft)
- Prominence: 45 m (148 ft)
- Listing: County Top
- Coordinates: 51°20′19″N 1°25′48″W

Geography
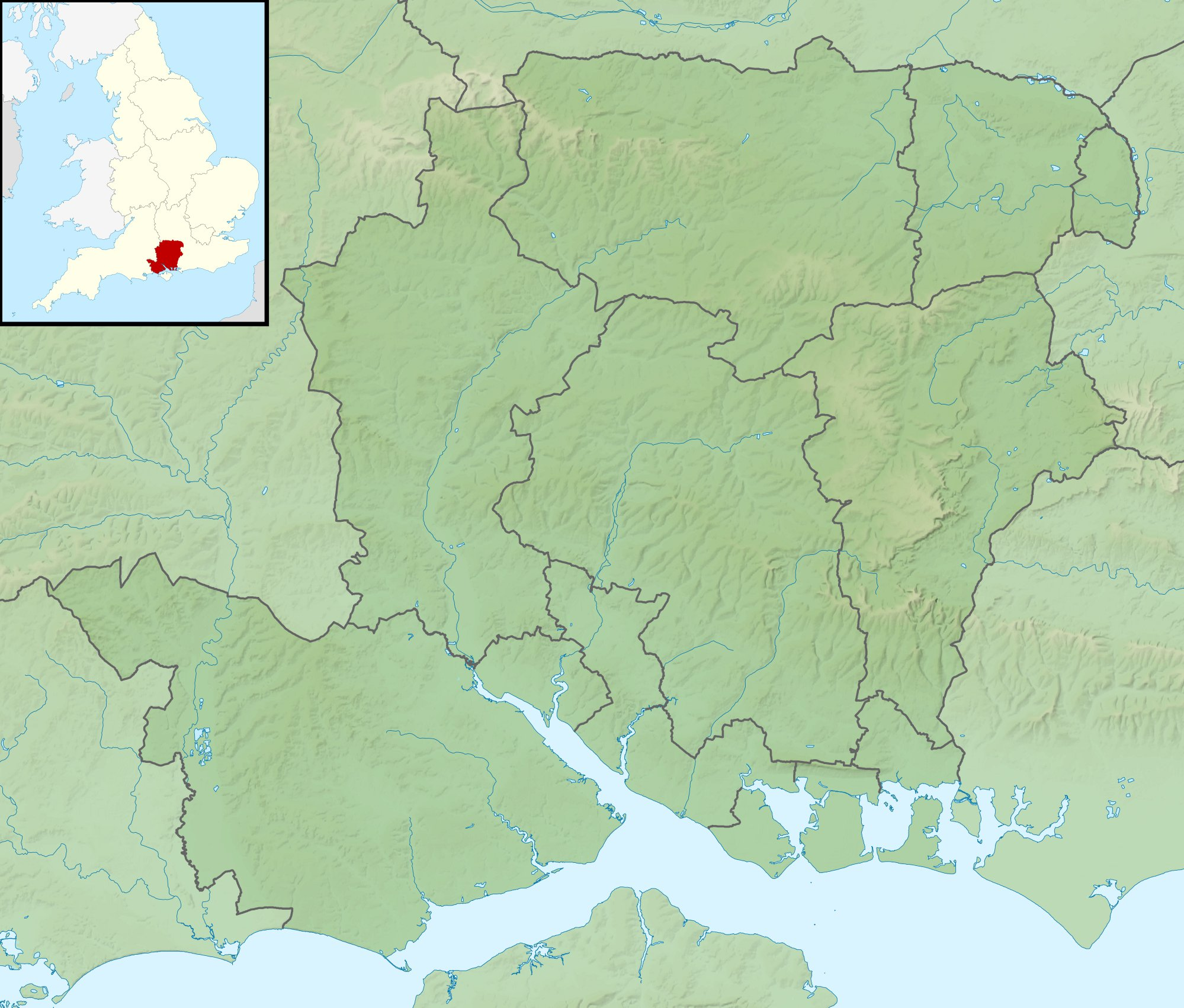
- Location within Hampshire
- Location: Hampshire, England
- Parent range: North Hampshire Downs
- OS grid: SU398601
- Topo map: OS Landranger 174

Pilot Hill is the highest summit in Hampshire, England, with a maximum elevation of 286 m (938 ft). It lies around 2 miles (3.2 km) to the south-east of Walbury Hill, the county top of Berkshire, which is 297 m (974 ft) high.

The hill is about 7 miles (11 km) southwest of Newbury on the Hampshire/Berkshire border and is part of the north-facing scarp of the North Hampshire Downs, a chalk ridge within the North Wessex Downs Area of Outstanding Natural Beauty. The upper slopes are open calcareous grassland, while the lower slopes are wooded.

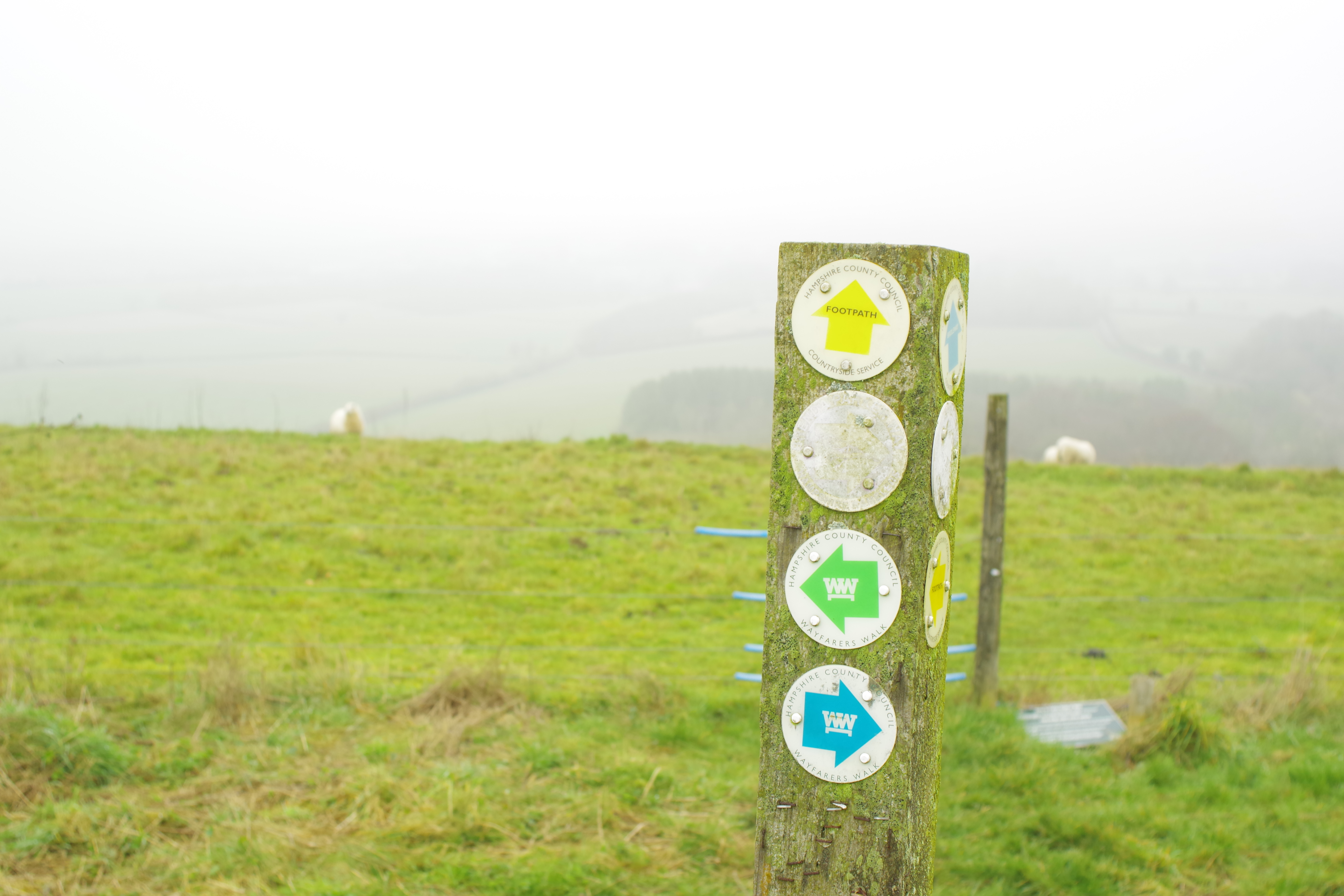
Walking trails passing across Pilot Hill

The hill lies within the civil parishes of East Woodhay (which includes the summit), Faccombe and Combe. East Woodhay is within the district of Basingstoke and Deane in the administrative county of Hampshire, Faccombe is in the Hampshire district of Test Valley, and Combe is within the unitary authority area of West Berkshire and the ceremonial county of Berkshire.
