= North Wessex Downs =

National Landscape in England

Coordinates: 51.457°N 1.508°W

North Wessex Downs National Landscape
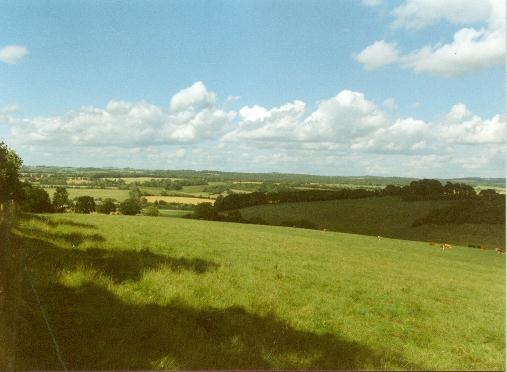
- This is a typical view of the chalk North Wessex Downs in the north west part of Hampshire

- Location of the North Wessex Downs AONB in the UK
- Location: England
- Designated: 1972

The North Wessex Downs are an area of chalk downland landscapes, largely turfed by grassland, located in the southern English counties of Berkshire, Hampshire, Oxfordshire and Wiltshire. The North Wessex Downs has been designated as a National Landscape (formerly known as Area of Outstanding Natural Beauty or AONB) since 1972.

The North Wessex Downs is a modern name coined with the creation of the AONB to encompass the area of chalk and limestone hills better known by various overlapping local names, including the Berkshire Downs, the North Hampshire Downs, the White Horse Hills, the Lambourn Downs, the Marlborough Downs, the Vale of Pewsey and Savernake Forest.

== Toponymy ==
This term is used to describe the characteristic landscape of 'elevated rolling grassy hills' in southern England, where chalk and limestone is exposed at the surface, acquiring this sense around the 14th century. The name "downs" is derived from the Celtic word "dun", meaning "fort" or "fastness" (and by extension "fortified settlement", from which it entered English as "town", similar to Germanic "burg"/"burough"), though the original meaning would have been "hill", as early forts were commonly hillforts - compare Germanic "burg" (fort) and "berg" (mountain).

== Topography ==
The AONB covers an area of some 1,730 km^{2} (670 sq mi). It takes the form of a horseshoe, with the open end facing east, surrounding the town of Newbury and the River Kennet catchment area. The northern arm reaches as far east as the suburbs of Reading in mid-Berkshire and as far north as Didcot in South Oxfordshire, whilst the southern arm extends to Basingstoke in northern Hampshire. To the west, the AONB reaches as far as Calne and Devizes. The highest points are the 297 m (974 ft) summit of Walbury Hill, situated southeast of Hungerford in West Berkshire (and the highest point in southern England east of the Mendip Hills), and the Milk Hill-Tan Hill plateau northeast of Devizes in central Wiltshire, at 295 m (968 ft) above sea level.

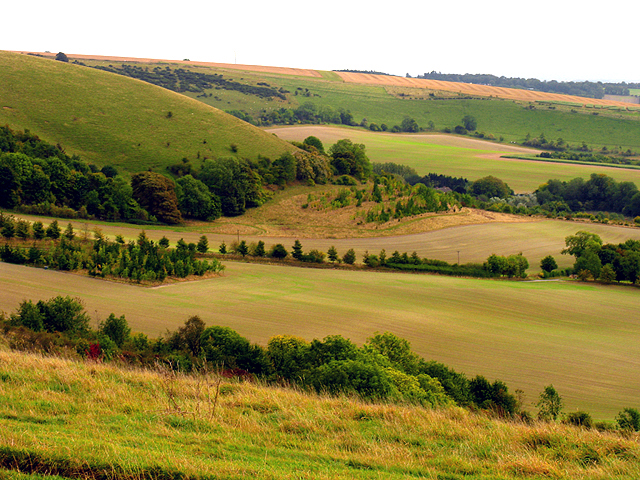
The southwestern slopes of Walbury Hill

At its northeast extreme, Lardon Chase within the North Wessex Downs AONB faces across the Goring Gap to the Chilterns AONB on the other side of the River Thames. From here working anti-clockwise around the horseshoe, the Berkshire Downs have a steep scarp slope facing north over the Vale of White Horse and a gentler dip slope facing south into the valley of the Kennet. This area includes the horse-racing village of Lambourn and is hence sometimes known as the Lambourn Downs. Beyond the town of Marlborough the downs (now called the Marlborough Downs) sweep in a semicircle to the south around the headwaters of the River Kennet, with the Vale of Pewsey cutting through these downs carrying the headwaters of the Hampshire River Avon. Here too can be found the wooded area of Savernake Forest. Finally, the highest stretch of the Downs runs east along the Berkshire-Hampshire border on the opposite side of the River Kennet from the Berkshire Downs. Again the scarp slope is to the north (facing down in the valley of the Kennet) and the dip slope is to the south into Hampshire.

=== Principal summits ===
Hills within the National Landscape with more than 30 metres of topographic prominence are listed below.

Rank	Hill	Elevation	Prominence	OS grid reference
1	Walbury Hill	296.8 m (974 ft)	188.7 m	SU373616
2	Milk Hill	294.3 m (966 ft)	147 m	SU104643
3	Tan Hill	294 m (965 ft)	48 m	SU082647
4	Martinsell Hill	289 m (948 ft)	76 m	SU178638
5	Pilot Hill	286 m (938 ft)	45 m	SU397601
6	Liddington Hill	276.5 m (907 ft)	114 m	SU213792
7	Hackpen Hill	272 m (892 ft)	103 m	SU128743
8	Golden Ball Hill	271 m (889 ft)	52 m	SU129640
9	Barbury Down	270.4 m (887 ft)	39 m	SU156759
10	Wexcombe Down	267 m (876 ft)	84 m	SU277577
11	Sidown Hill	266 m (873 ft)	32 m	SU445575
12	Cherhill Down	262 m (860 ft)	86 m	SU053689
13	Whitehorse Hill	261 m (856 ft)	79 m	SU301863
14	Beacon Hill	261 m (856 ft)	73 m	SU458572
15	Morgan's Hill	260 m (853 ft)	82 m	SU029668
16	Haydown Hill	258 m (846 ft)	31 m	SU313566
17	Charlbury Hill	253 m (830 ft)	65 m	SU237821
18	Coombe Down	246 m (807 ft)	37 m	SU182744
19	Sparsholt Down	244 m (801 ft)	42 m	SU336851
20	Roundway Hill	242 m (794 ft)	55 m	SU022646
21	Easton Hill	241.2 m (791 ft)	89.3 m	SU210592
22	Peaks Downs	241 m (791 ft)	34 m	SU264789
23	Lattin Down	239.7 m (786 ft)	30.1 m	SU414836
24	Milton Hill	238 m (781 ft)	38 m	SU191584
25	Watership Down	237 m (778 ft)	94.9 m	SU495568
26	King's Play Hill	232 m (761 ft)	32 m	SU009660
27	Ladle Hill	232 m (761 ft)	41 m	SU479567
28	Cottington's Hill	229.8 m (754 ft)	49.3 m	SU526566
29	Woodborough Hill	205 m (673 ft)	38 m	SU118614
30	Windmill Hill	195.5 m (641 ft)	31.3 m	SU087713
31	Waden Hill	192.3 m (631 ft)	36 m	SU104690
32	Etchilhampton Hill	190 m (623 ft)	61 m	SU032601
33	Silbury Hill	187.6 m (615 ft)	31.5 m	SU100685
34	Warren Hill	187.4 m (615 ft)	74 m	SU548814
35	Carvers Hill	183 m (600 ft)	31 m	SU300624
36	Nuthanger Hill	168.9 m (554 ft)	30.1 m	SU498583
37	Caveley Hill	161 m (528 ft)	39 m	SU484591
38	Grimsbury Castle	159.5 m (523 ft)	40 m	SU509722
39	Bussock Hill	150.4 m (493 ft)	35 m	SU463721
40	Snelsmore East Common	142.7 m (468 ft)	31.5 m	SU481711
41	Hoar Hill	141.1 m (463 ft)	36.7 m	SU432711
42	Wittenham Clumps	123.4 m (405 ft)	69 m	SU566927
43	Blewburton Hill	110 m (361 ft)	32 m	SU547861
44	Little Heath	105.5 m (346 ft)	61 m	SU653733

Twenty-five of these summits lie within the Berkshire and Marlborough Downs National Character Area (all of whose summits fall within the NL). Summits 1, 5, 11, 14, 16, 25, 27 and 28 are within the Hampshire Downs, summits 10, 21 and 24 are within Salisbury Plain and West Wiltshire Downs, summits 36, 37, 38, 39, 40 and 41 are within the Thames Basin Heaths, summit 42 is within the Upper Thames Clay Vales and summit 44 is within the Thames Valley.

== Geology and natural history ==
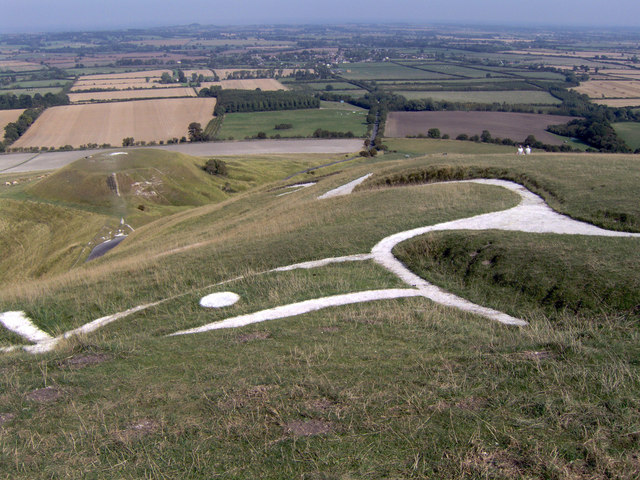
Uffington White Horse and Dragon Hill

The downland is part of the Southern England Chalk Formation which runs from Dorset in the west to Kent in the east and also includes the Dorset Downs, Purbeck Hills, Cranborne Chase, Wiltshire Downs, Salisbury Plain, the Isle of Wight, Chiltern Hills and the North and South Downs.

The area is a site of scientific interest in numerous fields and has an internationally important habitat for early gentian. Geologically, its chalk downs, dry valleys and sarsen outcrops are of note, the last in the area around Marlborough providing material for many of the Neolithic and Bronze Age sites in the area such as Avebury Henge.

== Economy ==
Horse racing forms a major industry in the area, largely because of the good quality turf that comes with the chalk underlay, and much of upland area is made over to gallops and other training areas. Several of the upland villages, and especially the large village of Lambourn, are home to major racing stables. Other villages with strong horse racing connections include Beckhampton, Kingsclere and West Ilsley. The term steeplechase originated in this area, a steeplechase originally being a race between two villages, navigated by reference to the church steeples visible across the rolling downs.

== Literature ==
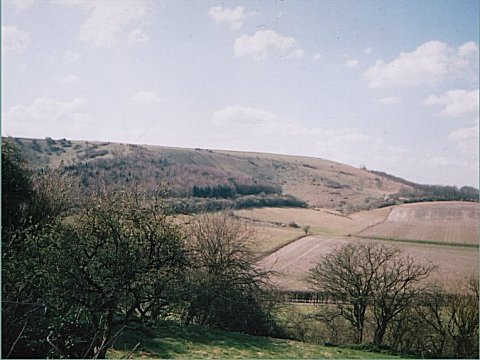
Watership Down, taken from the north-east

On the south-east arm of the AONB can be found Watership Down where the book Watership Down by Richard Adams is set, to the north of the small market town of Whitchurch, Hampshire.

Significant parts of Jude the Obscure by Thomas Hardy are set on and in the villages connected to the Berkshire Downs.

== AONB Council of Partners ==
The Area of Outstanding Natural Beauty was designated in 1972. It is managed by a Council of Partners whose members are:

- Local Authorities: Basingstoke and Deane Borough Council, Hampshire County Council, Vale of White Horse District Council, West Berkshire Council, Wiltshire Council, Oxfordshire County Council, South Oxfordshire District Council, Swindon Borough Council and Test Valley Borough Council
- Representing the interests of nature conservation: Natural England, Hampshire and Isle of Wight Wildlife Trust and Action for the River Kennet
- Representing the interests of the historic environment: Council for British Archaeology and English Heritage
- Representing the interests of farming and rural business: Axis Farming, Country Land and Business Association, Forestry Commission, Government Office for the South East and the National Farmers' Union
- Representing the interests of communities and parishes: Connecting Communities in Berkshire, the Friends of Pang, Kennet and Lambourn Valleys, Whitchurch Town Parish Council and Hungerford Town Council
- Representing the interests of recreation and rural tourism: Friends of the Ridgeway and the Ramblers' Association.
