= Geology of Hampshire =

Geology of English county

The visible geology of Hampshire in southern England broadly comprises a folded succession of sedimentary rocks dating from the Cretaceous and Palaeogene periods – mostly gentle folding in the north, more complex folding along the south coast. The lower (early) Cretaceous rocks are sandstones and mudstones whilst those of the upper (late) Cretaceous are the various formations that comprise the Chalk Group and give rise to the county's downlands. Overlying these rocks are the less consolidated Palaeogene clays, sands, gravels and silts of the Lambeth, Thames and Bracklesham Groups which characterise the Hampshire Basin.

Hampshire’s geological ‘basement’ was probably formed in the early Devonian or late Silurian periods, then folded during the later Devonian and early Permian periods. Two faults have driven much of its later geological development. The county’s near-surface geology was built up in three stages: first, when layers of clay, limestone and mudstone were laid down in and around Jurassic seas; then, when sands and clays washed off the London Platform early in the Cretaceous period; and finally, as the sea rose again and covered southern England to a considerable depth, great thicknesses of chalk were laid down. This was later shaped in two further stages; first the Alpine orogeny, which inverted the London Platform to become a London Basin, then the Anglian glaciation. The Anglian and later glaciations moved the course of the Thames (southwards) and the Solent (eastwards), and during this time the rivers that run between them were opened by melting glacial outwash, bringing sands, clays, gravels and some iron down these rivers.

Oil has been extracted from Triassic strata, and natural gas from the Great Oolite, at Humbly Grove and oil continues to be drawn from the Great Oolite at more than eighteen smaller wells near Horndean, Stockbridge and Andover.

== Fault System ==
The two major structures are the Purbeck–Wight and the Wardour–Portsdown fault zones. Both faults originated in Variscan northward thrusting that began in the Devonian and continued into the early Permian period, generating faults across a band from east to west that mainly propagated in a north-west to south-east direction. During the late Permian and Triassic periods, what had mostly been compressional tectonic movement (plates moving together) became extensional (plates moving apart), causing reverse faults to become normal faulting and starting the basins in Hampshire. These continued to subside between the Jurassic and the early Cretaceous, by which time the tectonic movement had largely ceased.

In Hampshire, the western end of a ridge running up from Dieppe separated the Weald basin from the Wessex and Hampshire basins. This ‘Hampshire–Dieppe high’ ran approximately between the two main faults.

During the late Cretaceous the north–south compression that was pushing up the Alps reversed the direction of these faults. In a series of relatively short but brisk pulses (lasting less than a million years each), softer areas of Cretaceous sands and chalk along the Wardour–Portsdown fault were inverted and pushed upwards into a series of synclines and anticlines (see ‘Chalk Downs’ below), while the hard Jurassic limestone along the south coast may have resisted the pressure, leading to a more complex pattern of folds, and both normal and reverse faults, along the Purbeck–Wight fault and further west. This may have continued as late as the Miocene. The eroded remains of the Hampshire–Dieppe high collapsed into a basin between the new anticlines along the Wardour–Portsdown fault and the Portland–Wight high (itself an inverted former basin).

The Bray fault in the English Channel may link with one or the other of these faults: the issue is controversial.

== Hampshire Basin ==
South of a ridge that runs from the coast, soft Eocene and Oligocene clays and gravels form low, fairly flat terrain, the Hampshire Basin. Protected from sea erosion by the Isle of Purbeck, Dorset, and the Isle of Wight, this land supports heathland and woodland habitats, a large area of which form part of the New Forest. The Basin extends for a considerable distance west across Dorset and southern Wiltshire.

Much of the coastal landscape of the Hampshire Basin results from sea level rise in the Flandrian (after the last ice age) some 6000 years BP. There are several large estuaries and rias, notably the 12-mile-long Southampton Water and the large, convoluted Portsmouth Harbour. The Solent, which separates the Isle of Wight from the coast of Hampshire, is the valley of what used to be a much larger river, erosion having broken the remaining chalk link with the mainland.

== Chalk Downs ==
In the centre and north of the county the substrate is the chalk of the Hampshire Downs and the South Downs. These are high hills with steep slopes where they border the clays to the south. The downland supports a calcareous grassland habitat, important for wild flowers and insects, as well as arable agriculture. The hills dip steeply forming a scarp onto the Kennet valley to the north, and dip gently to the south. The highest point in the county is Pilot Hill, which reaches the height of 286m/938 ft. The rivers Test and Itchen flow from the downland through green valleys, both supporting trout and other wildlife.

A series of east–west trending folds in the chalk to the north of the Hampshire Basin is controlled by the faults in the underlying strata. From south to north these are the Winchester-East Meon Anticline, the Winchester-King's Somborne Syncline/Alderbury–Mottisfont Syncline, the Stockbridge Anticline and the Micheldever Syncline. The Winchester–East Meon Anticline in particular gives rise to many hills including Yew Hill, Compton Down, Oliver's Battery, Magdalen (Morn) Hill, Chilcomb Down, Cheesefoot Head, Telegraph Hill, Deacon Hill, Twyford Down, St Catherine's Hill, Beacon Hill, Old Winchester Hill and Henwood Down.

Around the chalk margins to the north are the Pewsey–Kingsclere Anticline and to the south the Dean Hill Anticline, Portsdown Anticline, Forest of Bere Syncline and Chichester Syncline.

Further north, beyond the downs, the landscape is again lowland clay and gravel heathland, though the north (where the chalk is at or close to the surface) is generally greener and more diverse than the south.

== See also ==
- Geology of the United Kingdom
- Geology of the New Forest
- List of hills of Hampshire
