= Winchester–East Meon Anticline =

The Winchester-East Meon Anticline is one of a series of parallel east–west trending folds in the Cretaceous chalk of Hampshire. It lies at the western end of the South Downs, immediately to the north of the Hampshire Basin and south-east of Salisbury Plain.

== Structure ==
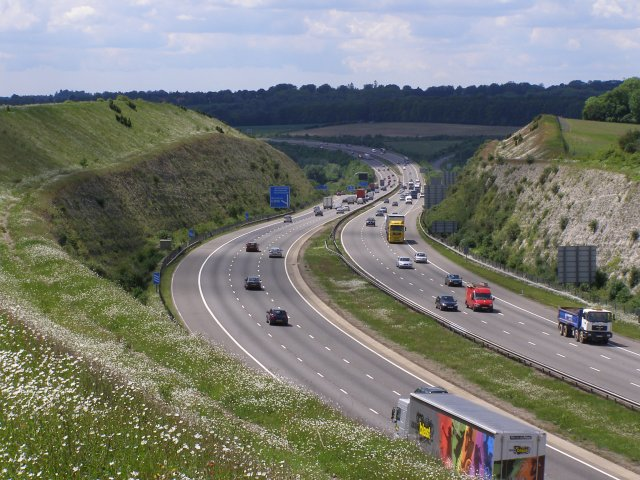
The M3 motorway cutting through the southern limb of the anticline.

The fold is around 35 kilometres (22 mi) long, running from north of Michelmersh near the River Test to East Meon in the valley of the River Meon. In the Winchester area the core of the anticline has been eroded to expose the older Cenomanian Zig Zag Chalk formation in Chilcomb and Bar End (the 'Lower chalk'). This is surrounded by progressively younger rings of the Turonian Holywell Nodular Chalk and New Pit Chalk Formation (the 'Middle chalk') and the Coniacian Lewes Nodular Chalk and Santonian Seaford Chalk Formation ('Upper chalk'). This results in a near-complete ring of inward-facing chalk scarp slopes including Magdalen (Morn) Hill to the north, Chilcomb Down, Cheesefoot Head and Telegraph Hill to the east, Deacon Hill, Twyford Down and St. Catherine's Hill to the south. To the west, cut off by the valley of the Itchen are Compton Down and Oliver's Battery.

The core of the anticline is crossed by the M3 motorway, completed in the 1990s. In order to avoid the Itchen Valley close to Winchester this cuts deeply through the younger beds to the north and south. Here the structure has dips of around 10° on the northern side and around 2° to the south.

To the east of Winchester the fold swings southwards towards East Meon as the Winchester-Meon Pericline. This has a slightly westward plunge, reflecting the axis of the Wealden Anticline. To the west of the Meon is Beacon Hill. Towards the eastern end near Warnford the West Melbury Marly Chalk member is exposed in the Meon Valley and at East Meon; this represents the bottom of the chalk. Between these outcrops lie Old Winchester Hill and Henwood Down.

To the west of Winchester the fold runs on slightly southwards through Farley Mount. To the south-west across the Test is a similar fold, the Dean Hill Anticline.

Parallel folds to the north include the Winchester-King's Somborne Syncline, the Stockbridge Anticline and the Micheldever Syncline. As with other nearby folds, the structure is controlled by movement of fault blocks within the Jurassic strata below.

The anticline has been explored for hydrocarbons, especially around Cheesefoot Head. Seismic surveys show faulting at depth in the Jurassic, but this tends to be represented in the Cretaceous at the surface by fold axes.

== See also ==
List of geological folds in Great Britain
