= Exton, Hampshire =

Village and parish in Hampshire, England

Coordinates: 50.98416°N 1.128746°W

Exton
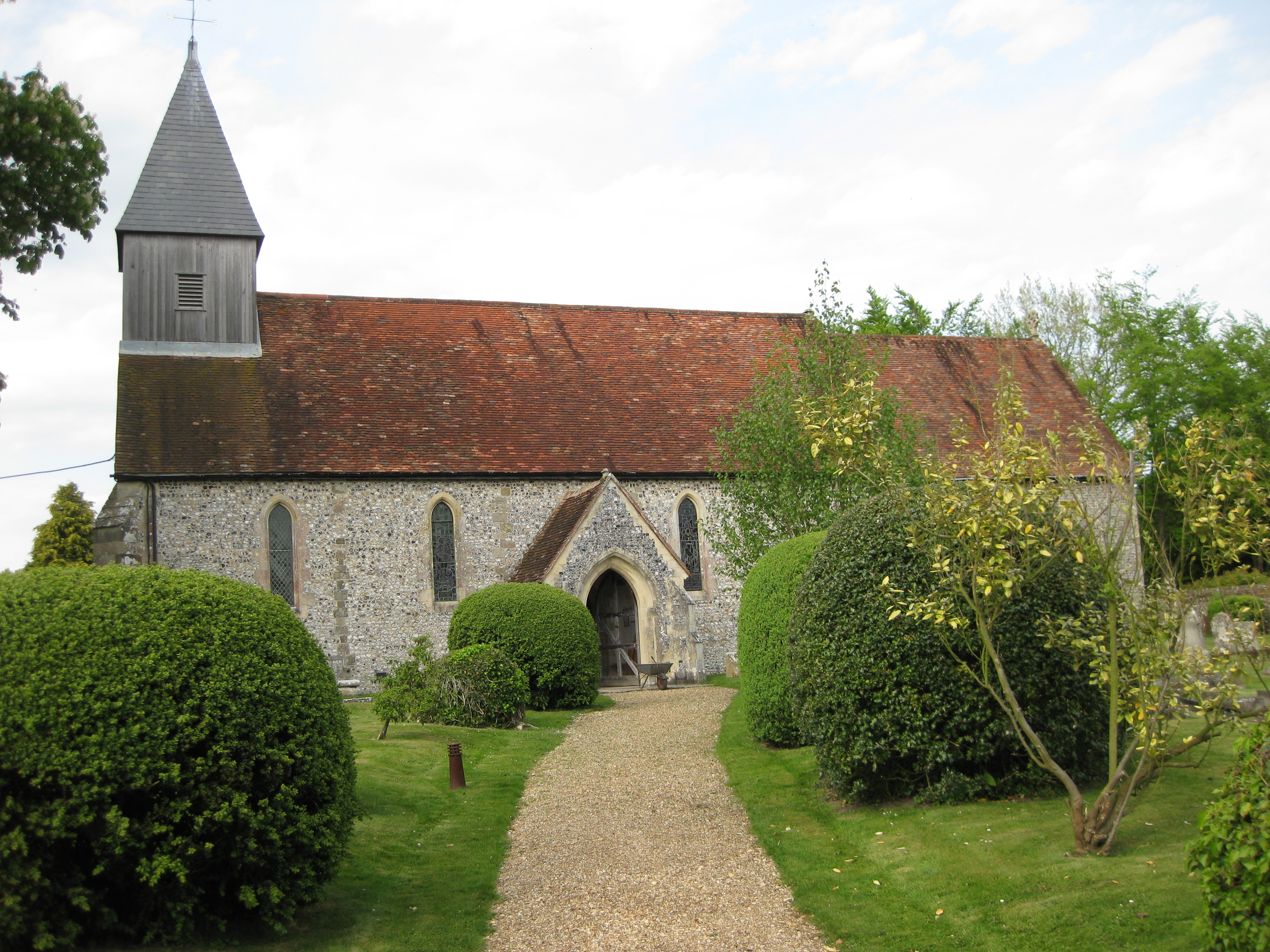
- St Peter and Paul Church

- Location within Hampshire
- Population: 230; 203 (2011 Census)
- OS grid reference: SU611209
- Civil parish: Exton
- District: City of Winchester
- Shire county: Hampshire
- Region: South East
- Country: England
- Sovereign state: United Kingdom
- Post town: SOUTHAMPTON
- Postcode district: SO32
- Dialling code: 01489
- Police: Hampshire and Isle of Wight
- Fire: Hampshire and Isle of Wight
- Ambulance: South Central
- UK Parliament: Winchester
- Website: Exton Parish Council

Exton is a small village and civil parish in the City of Winchester district of Hampshire, England. The village lies in the South Downs National Park, on the west bank of the River Meon, immediately to the north of Corhampton. It is located two miles north of Droxford and five miles north-east of Bishop's Waltham. Its name first appears in 940 as East Seaxnatune, meaning "farmstead of the East Saxons".

The parish straddles the Meon Valley, including higher ground of the South Downs to either side, with Old Winchester Hill to the east and the southern part of Beacon Hill (shared with Warnford parish) to the west. It is crossed from east to west by the South Downs Way long-distance footpath. The A32 and the Meon Valley Railway footpath cross from north to south.

The parish contains numerous archaeological sites including a Mesolithic flint working site, Bronze Age bowl barrows and the Iron Age fort at Old Winchester Hill. There are also Roman and Dark Age sites and the site of the mediaeval village of Lomer. The 13th-century church of St Peter and St Paul was heavily restored in the 19th century. The 1892 restoration (the second of the 19th century) added stained glass windows by Charles Spooner in the style of the Arts and Crafts movement.

Exton has remained a small community for more than two centuries. In 1801 Exton's total population was 224, by 1901 it had grown slightly to 299 yet by 2001 the population had shrunk to 230 and again to 203 at the 2011 Census. Photographs from the 1950s show a village shop and post office in Exton but this closed in the 1960s. The only community buildings in the village are the church and the Shoe Inn public house.

In 1870–72, John Goring's Imperial Gazetteer of England and Wales described Exton like this:

"EXTON, a village and a parish in Droxford district, Hants. The village stands 2 miles N by E of Droxford, and 5 NE of Bishops-Waltham r. station; and has a post office under Southampton. The parish comprises 2,464 acres (10 km²). Real property, £2,640. Pop., 257. Houses, 41. Exton Lodge is a principal residence. The living is a rectory in the diocese of Winchester. Value, 331.* Patron, the Bishop of Winchester. The church was rebuilt in 1847, and is in the early English style. "

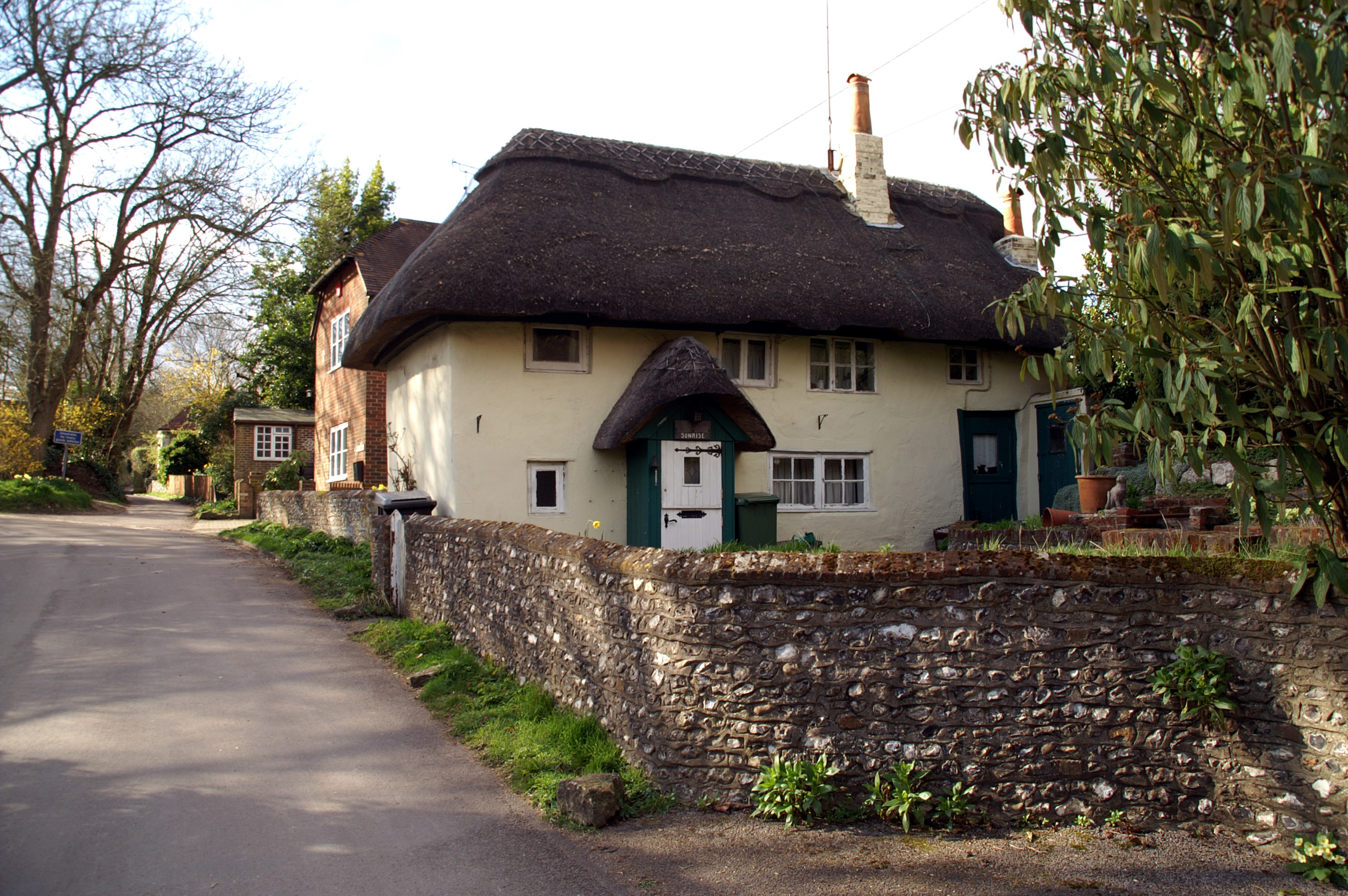
Cottages in Exton

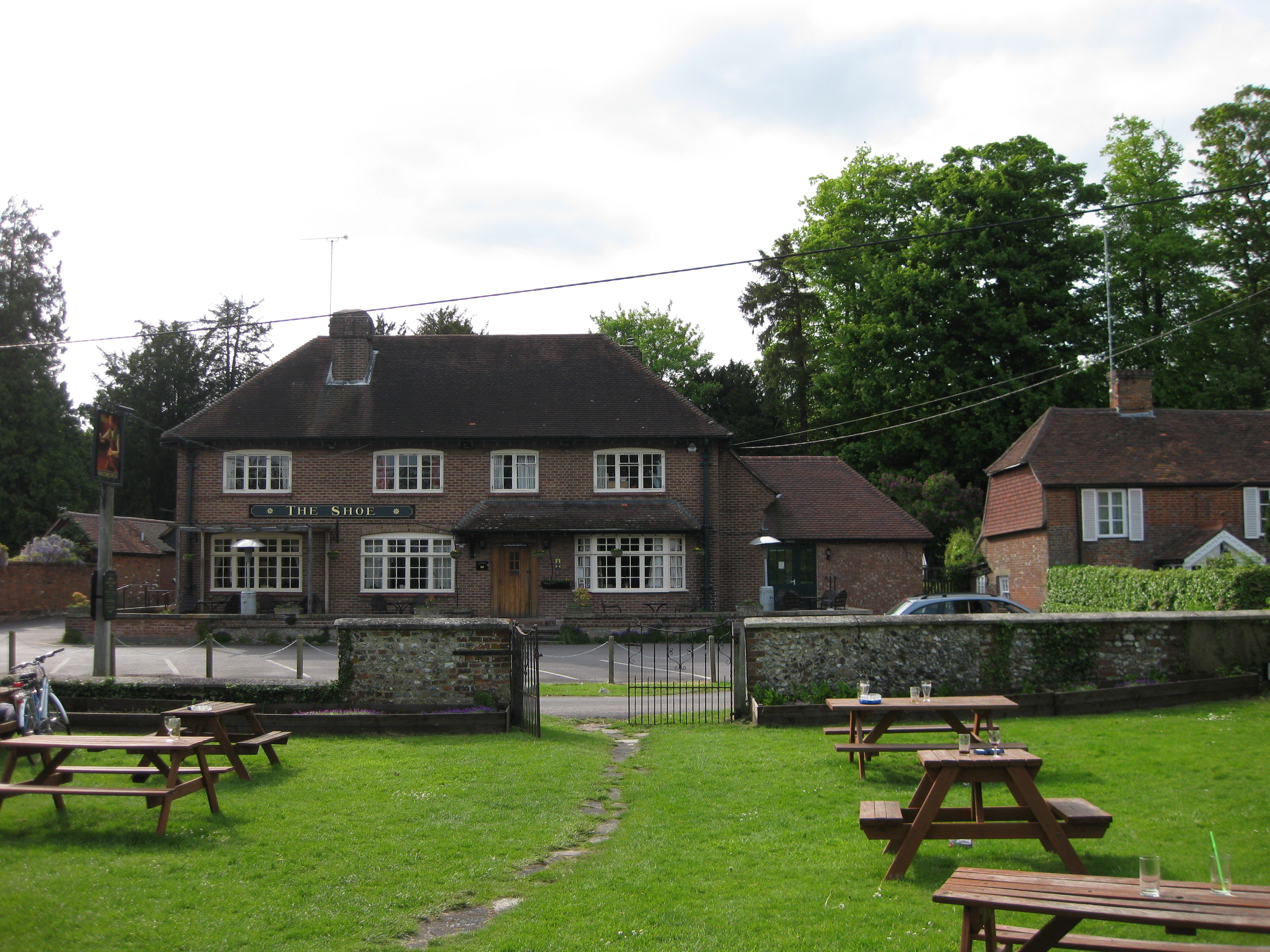
Shoe Public House in Exton
