= List of geological folds in Great Britain =

This is a list of the named geological folds affecting the rocks of Great Britain and the Isle of Man.

== Terminology ==
See the main article on folds for a fuller treatment of fold types and nomenclature but in brief, an anticline is an arch-like fold whereas a syncline is its converse; a downfold. Antiforms, anticlinoria, synforms and synclinoria are variations on these. A monocline (or, rarely, a monoform) is a step-like fold, one limb of which is roughly horizontal. Both domes and periclines are anticlines in which the strata fall away about equally in all directions.

There are also a number of 'disturbances' named in parts of the country, notably in South Wales. These linear features are a combination of faults and folds - the relative importance of faulting and folding varying along the length of each disturbance.

== List of folds ==
=== Key to table ===
- Column 1 indicates the name of the fold. Some variant spellings are recorded between sources.
- Column 2 indicates the county in which the fold occurs. Some traverse two or more counties of course.
- Column 3 indicates in which of the constituent countries of Great Britain the fold lies. (Note that the Isle of Man does not form a part of Great Britain but is included here for convenience.)
- Column 4 indicates on which 1:50,000 or 1" scale geological map sheet published by the British Geological Survey (BGS) the fold is shown and named (either on map/s or cross-section/s or both). 'E&W' signifies the series of sheets published to cover England and Wales. A handful of maps at other scales are also listed where they depict the feature concerned.
- Column 5 indicates a selection of publications in which references to the fold may be found. See references section for full details of publication.

Sortable table of named folds
| Fold name | County | Country | BGS map sheet | book reference/s |
|---|---|---|---|---|
| Aberfoyle Anticline | Argyll | Scotland | Sc 36, Sc37W, Sc 37E | Trewin (ed) 2002 |
| Airds Hill Anticline | Argyll | Scotland | Sc 45W, Sc 53W | |
| Alderbury-Mottisfont Syncline | Hampshire/Wiltshire | England | E&W 298/9 | |
| Alfold Anticline | | England | E&W 301 | |
| Amesbury Syncline | | England | E&W 298 | |
| Angle Syncline | Pembrokeshire | Wales | E&W 244/5 | |
| Appin Syncline (=Cul Bay Syncline?) | | Scotland | Sc 53W | |
| Ardonald Anticline | | Scotland | Sc 85E | |
| Ardrishaig Anticline | Argyll | Scotland | Sc 28E, Sc 29W, Sc 36, Sc 37W, Sc 37E | Argyll & Bute etc. |
| Arley Anticline | | England | E&W 110 | BGS:BRG 10 |
| Arley Dome | Warwickshire | England | E&W 169 | |
| Arlington Anticline | East Sussex | England | E&W 319/334 | |
| Armadale Antiform | | Scotland | Sc 115W | |
| Ashby Anticline | Leicestershire | England | E&W 141, 155 (x-sections) | BGS:BRG 10; Smith et al. 2005 |
| Ashover Anticline | | England | E&W 112 | Smith et al. 2005 |
| Astbury Anticline | | England | | |
| Astley Syncline | Warwickshire | England | E&W 169 | |
| Aughton Anticline | | | E&W 59 | |
| Avonmouth Syncline | | England | | BGS:BRG 16 |
| Babel Anticline | | Wales | E&W 213 | |
| Backingstone Anticline | Glamorgan | Wales | | Brief explan to E&W 247, 2011 |
| Ballimeanoch Syncline | Argyll | Scotland | Sc 45W | |
| Balls Cross Anticline | | England | E&W 301 | |
| Bannisdale Syncline | Cumbria | England | E&W 38, 39, 48 | Brenchley & Rawson 2006; BGS:BRG 7 |
| Barford St Martin Syncline | | England | E&W 298 | |
| Barmaddy Anticline | Argyll | Scotland | Sc 45W | |
| Beacon Hill Pericline | | England | | BGS:BRG 16 |
| Bealach-dubh Syncline | | Scotland | Sc 54E | |
| Beatrix Fell Syncline | | England | E&W 59 | |
| Beinn a'Chlachair Synform | | Scotland | Sc 63W | |
| Beinn a'Ghlo Anticline | | Scotland | Sc 64E | |
| Beinn Chuirn Anticline | | Scotland | Sc 46W | |
| Beinn Direach Anticline | | Scotland | Sc 108W | |
| Beinn Donn Syncline (*also 'Beinn Don Syncline') | Argyll | Scotland | Sc 45W, *Sc 53W | |
| Beinn Mholach Antiformal Syncline | | Scotland | Sc54E | |
| Beinn Sgluich Anticline | Argyll | Scotland | Sc 45W | |
| Beinn Sgulaird Recumbent Syncline | | Scotland | Sc 53W | |
| Beinn Sgulaird Syncline | Argyll | Scotland | Sc 45W | |
| Beinn Udlaidh Syncline | | Scotland | Sc 46W | |
| Ben Alder Anticline | | Scotland | Sc54E | |
| Ben Alder Syncline | | Scotland | Sc54E | |
| Ben Hee Anticline | | Scotland | Sc 108W | |
| Ben Lawers Synform | Argyll | Scotland | Sc 45W, Sc 45E Sc 55W | |
| Ben Ledi Antiform | | Scotland | Sc 38E | |
| Ben Lui Syncline | | Scotland | Sc 46W | |
| Ben Sgluich Anticline | | Scotland | Sc53W | |
| Ben Vane Synform | | Scotland | Sc 38E | |
| Benson Knott Syncline | Cumbria | England | E&W 39 | |
| Bere Forest Syncline | Hampshire | England | E&W 316 | |
| Berwick Monocline | Northumberland/Berwickshire | England/Scotland | | BGS:BRG 7 |
| Berwyn Anticline | | Wales | UK (south) 625K; E&W 136 | Brenchley & Rawson 2006 |
| Berwyn Dome | | Wales | E&W 136, 137 | Brenchley & Rawson 2006 |
| Bewcastle Anticline | Cumbria | England | | BGS:BRG 7 |
| Bhuirich Dome | | Scotland | Assynt (special 50K) | |
| Birdlip Anticline ('High') | | England | | BGS:BRG 16 |
| Black Isle Syncline | | Scotland | | BGS:BRG 2 |
| Bohespic Antiform | | Scotland | Sc 55W | |
| Boldon Syncline | Durham | England | | BGS:BRG 7 |
| Boscombe Down Anticline | | England | E&W 298 | |
| Bosherston Anticline | Pembrokeshire | Wales | E&W 244/5 | |
| Bowhill Syncline | | Scotland | Sc 40E | |
| Boyndie Syncline | | Scotland | | Trewin (ed) 2002 |
| Bradley Anticline | Yorkshire | England | E&W 69 | |
| Bradley Syncline | Yorkshire | England | E&W 69 | |
| Branddu Syncline | | Wales | E&W 195 | |
| Brawl Synform | | Scotland | Sc 115W | |
| Breabag Dome | | Scotland | Assynt (special 50K), | G & K 2011 |
| Breedon Anticline | | England | | Smith et al. 2005 |
| Breidden Anticline | Powys | Wales | | Toghill P. 2006 |
| Brendon Anticline | Somerset | England | | Proc.Geol.Ass'n. vol76, pt1. 1965 |
| Brendon Syncline | Somerset | England | | Proc.Geol.Ass'n. vol76, pt1. 1965 |
| Brimington Anticline | | England | E&W 100, E&W 112 | |
| Brinsford Anticline | | England | E&W 153 | |
| Broadfield Down Anticline | | England | E&W 264 | |
| Broadford Anticline | | Scotland | | BGS:BRG 3 |
| Broad Bench Anticline | Dorset | England | | GA Guide22 |
| Brogan Anticline | | Wales | | Brenchley & Rawson 2006 |
| Brown Clee Syncline | Shropshire | England | Mid Wales & Marches 250K | BGS:BRG 10; Toghill P. 2006 |
| Bullslaughter Bay Syncline | Pembrokeshire | Wales | E&W 244/5 | |
| Burntisland Anticline | | Scotland | Sc 40E | Trewin (ed) 2002 |
| Burton Anticline | Pembrokeshire | Wales | E&W 228 | Allen et al 1982 |
| Bwn Bach Anticline | | Wales | E&W 193 | |
| Caburn Syncline | East Sussex | England | E&W 318/333, E&W 319/334 | |
| Caerdeon Syncline | Merionethshire | Wales | E&W 135 | |
| Cain / Tanat Syncline | | Wales | | Brenchley & Rawson 2006 |
| Camp Hill Monocline | Warwickshire | England | E&W 169 | |
| Capel Curig Anticline | Gwynedd | Wales | E&W 106 | |
| Capel Hill Syncline | | Scotland | Sc 56W | |
| Cardiff-Cowbridge Anticline | Glamorgan | Wales | E&W 263 | |
| Carlin Gill Anticline | Cumbria | England | E&W 39 | Brenchley & Rawson 2006 |
| Carlisle Anticline | Cumbria | England | | BGS:BRG 7 |
| Carnmore Antiform | | Scotland | | BGS:BRG 2 |
| Carn Owen Pericline | | Wales | E&W 163 | |
| Castlemartin Cors Anticline | Pembrokeshire | Wales | E&W 244/5 | |
| Castley Knotts Syncline | Cumbria | England | E&W 39 | |
| Catacol Synform | | Scotland | | BGS:BRG 3 |
| Cedni Syncline | | Wales | E&W 196 | |
| Cefn Syncline | Shropshire | England | | Toghill P. 2006 |
| Cefn Bryn Anticline | Glamorgan | Wales | | Brief expln to E&W 247, 2011 |
| Cefn Mawr Syncline | Glamorgan | Wales | | Brief expln to E&W 247, 2011 |
| Cefngarreg Syncline | | Wales | E&W 213 | |
| Central Wales Syncline | | Wales | Mid Wales & Marches 250K | Brenchley & Rawson 2006 |
| Central Wales Synclinorium | | Wales | | |
| Chaldon Pericline | Dorset | England | | |
| Charnian Anticline | | England | | Smith et al. 2005 |
| Chepstow Anticline | | | | Welch, FBA & Trotter, FM 1961 |
| Chichester Syncline | Hampshire | England | E&W 316, E&W 317/322 | |
| Chop Gate Dome | Yorkshire | England | | BGS:BRG9 |
| Cinderhill Flexure | | England | E&W 125 | |
| Clackmannan Syncline | | Scotland | Sc 39E | Trewin (ed) 2002 |
| Clanna Anticline | | | | Welch, FBA & Trotter, FM 1961 |
| Clanna - Beachley Pericline | | | | Welch, FBA & Trotter, FM 1961 |
| Cleeve Hill Syncline ('Trough') | | England | | BGS:BRG 16 |
| Cleveland Anticline | Yorkshire | England | | BGS:BRG9 |
| Clun Valley Syncline | Shropshire | England | | Toghill P. 2006 |
| Clunes Antiform | | Scotland | Sc 55W | |
| Clunes Synform | | Scotland | Sc 55W | |
| Clyngwyn Syncline | | Wales | E&W 195 | |
| Coalpit Heath Syncline | | England | | BGS:BRG 16 |
| Coalport Syncline | | England | E&W 153 | |
| Coalville Syncline | | England | | Smith et al. 2005 |
| Coire Bhran Anticline | | Scotland | Sc 64W | |
| Coire na h-eiginn Anticline | | Scotland | Sc 54E | |
| Cole Syncline | | England | | BGS:BRG 16 |
| Collington Anticline | | England | Mid Wales & Marches 250K | |
| Coltshill Anticline | Glamorgan | Wales | | Brief expln to E&W 247, 2011 |
| Combe Bissett Syncline | | England | E&W 298 | |
| Compton Valence Dome | | England | E&W 327 | |
| Corris Anticline | | Wales | E&W 149 | |
| Cotherstone Syncline | | England | E&W 31 | |
| Cothi Anticline | | Wales | E&W 195 | |
| Cowal Antiform | Argyll | Scotland | Sc 20, Sc 29W, Sc 29E, Sc 37W, Sc 37E | Trewin (ed) 2002 |
| Craig Ysgiog Anticline | | Wales | E&W 149 | |
| Craignure Anticline | Highland | Scotland | Sc 44W/44E | BGS:BRG 3 |
| Creag a'Mhadaidh Anticline | | Scotland | Sc 54E | |
| Creag a'Mhadaidh Antiform | | Scotland | Sc 55W | |
| Creag a'Mhadaidh Syncline | | Scotland | Sc 54E | |
| Creag a'Mhadaidh Antiformal Syncline | | Scotland | Sc 54E | |
| Creag Dhubh Synform | | Scotland | Sc 64W | |
| Creagan Loisgte Syncline | | Scotland | Sc 27 | |
| Crich Anticline | | England | E&W 112, E&W 125 | |
| Croydon Anticline | Somerset | England | | Proc.Geol.Ass'n. vol76, pt1. 1965 |
| Cuil Bay Syncline (*or 'Cul Bay Syncline') | Argyll | Scotland | Sc 45W, *Sc 53W | |
| Cumberland Monocline | | England | | Brenchley & Rawson 2006; BGS:BRG 7 |
| Cyrn-y-Brain Anticline | | Wales | | Plant et al. 1999 |
| Danby Head Dome | Yorkshire | England | | BGS:BRG9 |
| Dean Hill Anticline | Hampshire/Wiltshire | England | E&W 298/9 | |
| Derbyshire Dome | | England | | Smith et al. 2005 |
| Derwen Anticline | | Wales | | Brenchley & Rawson 2006 |
| Dhoon Anticline | | Isle of Man | IoM (50K special sheet) | Brenchley & Rawson 2006 |
| Dhoon-Port Erin Anticline | | Isle of Man | | BGS:BRG 7 |
| Dhorius Anticline | | Scotland | Sc 27 | |
| Dionard Antiform | | Scotland | | BGS:BRG 2 |
| Doethie Anticline | | Wales | E&W 195 | |
| Dolwen Anticline | | Wales | E&W 135 | Brenchley & Rawson 2006 |
| Dolwen Pericline | | Wales | | |
| Dolwyddelan Syncline | | Wales | | Brenchley & Rawson 2006 |
| Don Monocline | Yorkshire | England | E&W 87, E&W 100 | |
| Donfield Syncline | | England | E&W 100 | |
| Donnington Syncline | | England | E&W 153 | |
| Douglas Syncline | | Isle of Man | IoM (50K special sheet) | Brenchley & Rawson 2006; BGS:BRG 7 |
| Dovedale Anticline | | England | | Smith et al. 2005 |
| Dovey Syncline | | Wales | E&W 163 | |
| Druimavuic Syncline | Argyll | Scotland | Sc 45W | |
| Drws-y-coed Syncline | Gwynedd | Wales | E&W 119 | |
| Duffield Anticline | | England | | Smith et al. 2005 |
| Dundonnell Antiform | | Scotland | | BGS:BRG 2 |
| Dyffryn Elwy Anticline | Clwyd | Wales | | Mem E&W 95/107 |
| Dyfi Syncline | | Wales | E&W 149 | |
| Earl's Seat Anticline | | Scotland | Sc 40E | Trewin (ed) 2002 |
| Eastnor Syncline | | England | E&W 216 | |
| Ebernoe Anticline | | England | E&W 301 | |
| Ecton Anticline | | England | E&W 111 | |
| Eday Syncline | Shetland | Scotland | | BGS:BRG 1 |
| Elswick Anticline | Lancashire | England | E&W 67 | |
| Elswick Dome | Lancashire | England | E&W 67 | |
| Erewash Valley Anticline | | England | E&W 125 | |
| Errochty Synform | | Scotland | Sc 55W | |
| Eskdale Anticline | Yorkshire | England | | BGS:BRG9 |
| Fairlight Anticline | East Sussex | England | E&W 320/321 | |
| Falkirk-Stane Syncline | | Scotland | | Trewin (ed) 2002 |
| Farfield Syncline | Cumbria | England | E&W 39 | Trewin (ed) 2002 |
| Fell End Syncline | | England | | BGS:BRG 7 |
| Fernhurst Anticline | | England | E&W 301 | |
| Fiag Syncline | | Scotland | Sc 108W | |
| Fillongley Anticline | | England | | Smith et al. 2005 |
| Foel Dinas Syncline | | Wales | E&W 150 | |
| Forest of Dean Syncline | | England | | Brenchley & Rawson 2006 |
| Fox-Strangways Dome | Yorkshire | England | | BGS:BRG9 |
| Freshwater East Anticline | Pembrokeshire | Wales | E&W 244/5 | |
| Frome Syncline | Dorset | England | | GA Guide22 |
| Fylingdales Syncline | Yorkshire | England | | BGS:BRG9 |
| Gaick Anticline | | Scotland | Sc 64W | |
| Gaick Syncline | | Scotland | Sc 64W | |
| Garry Synform | | Scotland | Sc 55W | |
| Geal Charn Syncline | | Scotland | Sc 54E | |
| Gell Syncline | Clwyd | Wales | | Mem E&W 95/107 |
| Giur-bheinn Anticline | | Scotland | Sc 27 | |
| Glaick Anticline | | Scotland | Sc 64W | |
| Glaick Syncline | | Scotland | Sc 64W | |
| Glen Creran Anticline | Argyll | Scotland | Sc 45W, Sc 53W | |
| Glen Lochy Anticline | | Scotland | Sc 46W | |
| Glen Orchy Antiform | | Scotland | | Trewin (ed) 2002 |
| Glenborrodale Antiform | | Scotland | Sc 51E | |
| Gloddaeth Syncline | Clwyd | Wales | | Mem E&W 95/107 |
| Goathland Syncline | Yorkshire | England | | BGS:BRG9 |
| Gorseinon Syncline | Glamorgan | Wales | | Brief expln to E&W 247, 2011 |
| Gowerton Syncline | Glamorganshire | Wales | E&W 247 | |
| Goyt Syncline | | England | | Smith et al. 2005 |
| Great Orme Syncline | Clwyd | Wales | | Mem E&W 95/107 |
| Great Ridge Anticline | | England | E&W 298 | |
| Gressingham Syncline | | England | E&W 59 | |
| Guilsfield Anticline | | | E&W 151 | |
| Gun Hill Anticline | | England | E&W 111 | |
| Greenhurst Anticline | | England | E&W 318/333 | |
| Gwesyn Syncline | | Wales | E&W 196 | |
| Gwytherin Syncline | Clwyd | Wales | | Mem E&W 95/107 |
| Ham Anticline | | Scotland | Sc 116W | |
| Hardstoft Anticline | | England | E&W 112 | |
| Harlech Dome | Merionethshire | Wales | Mid Wales & Marches 250K | Brenchley & Rawson 2006 |
| Hareslade Syncline | Glamorgan | Wales | | Brief expln to E&W 247, 2011 |
| Harrogate Anticline | Yorkshire | England | E&W 62, 69 | |
| Harting Combe Anticline | | England | E&W 301 | |
| Haslemere Syncline | | England | E&W 301 | |
| Haweswater Syncline | Cumbria | England | | BGS:BRG 7 |
| Heath Anticline | | England | E&W 112 | |
| Heatherslade Anticline | Glamorgan | Wales | | Brief expln to E&W 247, 2011 |
| Hem Anticline | | England | E&W 153 | |
| Hendre-ddu Syncline | | Wales | E&W 150 | |
| Henfield Syncline | | England | E&W 318/333 | |
| Heysham Anticline | | England | E&W 59 | |
| Highland Border Downbend | | Scotland | Sc 38E, Sc 56W, Sc 67 | Trewin (ed) 2002 |
| Hindhead Anticline | | England | E&W 301 | |
| Hog Hill Syncline | | Scotland | Sc 11 | |
| Hog's Back Monocline | | England | | |
| Hollingbury Dome | | England | E&W 318/333 | |
| Holymoorside Monocline | | England | E&W 112 | |
| Hope Mansel Anticline | | | | Welch, FBA & Trotter, FM 1961 |
| Horseshoe Anticline | | | | Smith et al. 2005 |
| Hortham Syncline | | | | Welch, FBA & Trotter, FM 1961 |
| Howle Hill Syncline | | | | Welch, FBA & Trotter, FM 1961 |
| Huntington Syncline | | England | E&W 153 | |
| Hutton Monocline | | England | E&W 59 | |
| Idwal Syncline | Gwynedd | Wales | E&W 106 | |
| Inver - Black Isle Syncline | | Scotland | | BGS:BRG 2 |
| Ironville Anticline | | England | E&W 112, E&W 125 | |
| Islay Anticline | | Scotland | Sc 27 | |
| Islay Syncline | | Scotland | Sc 36 | |
| Kempie Syncline | Sutherland | Scotland | | G & K 2011 |
| Kilchrenan Syncline | Argyll | Scotland | Sc 45W | |
| Kilmelford Monoform | Argyll | Scotland | Sc 45W | |
| Kilmory Bay Syncline | Argyll & Bute | Scotland | Sc 28E | |
| Kingsclere Anticline | | England | E&W 283 | |
| Kingston-Beddingham Anticline | East Sussex | England | E&W 318/333, E&W 319/334 | |
| Kingswood Anticline | Somerset | England | | BGS:BRG 16 |
| King's Wood Syncline | | | | Welch, FBA & Trotter, FM 1961 |
| Kinlochlaggan Syncline | | Scotland | Sc 63E | |
| Kirk Ireton Syncline | | England | E&W 125 | |
| Kirkham Syncline | Lancashire | England | E&W 67 | |
| Kirtomy Synform | | Scotland | Sc 115W | |
| Kiveton Anticline | | England | E&W 100 | |
| Knapdale Steep Belt | Argyll & Bute | Scotland | Sc 28E | |
| Knots Anticline | | England | E&W 59 | |
| Laggan Anticline | | Scotland | Sc 63E | |
| Lancaster Moor Syncline | | England | E&W 59 | |
| Langland Anticline | Glamorgan | Wales | | Brief expln to E&W 247, 2011 |
| Lask Edge Anticline | | England | E&W 110 | |
| Leagag Antiform | | Scotland | Sc 54E | |
| Ledwyche Anticline | | Wales | Mid Wales & Marches 250K | |
| Lemmington Anticline | Northumberland | England | E&W 6 | BGS:BRG 7 |
| Letterewe Synform | | Scotland | | BGS:BRG 7; Trewin (ed) 2002 |
| Leven Syncline | | | UK (north) 625K, Sc 40E | Trewin (ed) 2002 |
| Limley Anticline | | England | E&W 51 | |
| Littlehampton Anticline | West Sussex | England | E&W 317/332, E&W 318/333 | |
| Littleton Syncline | | | | Welch, FBA & Trotter, FM 1961 |
| Littlewood Syncline | West Sussex | England | E&W 317/332 | |
| Litton Cheney Syncline | Dorset | England | | GA Guide22 |
| Llanelly Syncline | Glamorgan | Wales | | Brief expln to E&W 247, 2011 |
| Llan Syncline (Ritton Castle Syncline) | Shropshire | England | E&W 151, 165 | Toghill P. 2006 |
| Llandderfel Syncline | | Wales | UK (south) 625K, E&W 150 | |
| Llangadfan Syncline | | Wales | E&W 150 | |
| Llangollen Syncline | | Wales | | Plant, JA et al. 1999 |
| Llanidloes Syncline | | Wales | E&W 164 | |
| Llŷn Syncline | Gwynedd | Wales | E&W 134 | |
| Loch Ailsh Syncline | | Scotland | | BGS:BRG 2 |
| Loch Alsh Fold | | Scotland | Sc 71E | |
| Loch Awe Syncline (*or 'Loch Awe Synform') | Argyll | Scotland | Sc 28E, Sc 36, Sc 37W, Sc 37E, *Sc 45E | Trewin (ed) 2002 |
| Loch Don Anticline | | Scotland | Sc 44E | |
| Loch Laggan Antiform | | Scotland | Sc 63W | |
| Loch Maree Synform | | Scotland | | BGS:BRG 2 |
| Loch Sween Anticline | Argyll & Bute | Scotland | Sc 28E | |
| Loch Tay Antiform | | Scotland | Sc 55W | |
| Lochalsh Syncline | | Scotland | | BGS:BRG 3; Trewin (ed) 2002 |
| Lochan Dubh Synform | | Scotland | Sc 54E | |
| Lochinver Antiform | | Scotland | | BGS:BRG 2 |
| Lochinver Monocline | Sutherland | Scotland | | G & K 2011 |
| Lockton Anticline | Yorkshire | England | | BGS:BRG9 |
| Lodsworth Syncline | | England | E&W 301 | |
| London Basin Syncline | | England | | BGS:BRG 13, Brenchley & Rawson 2006 |
| Long Mountain Syncline | Shropshire | England | E&W 151 | Toghill P. 2006 |
| Longstone Edge Anticline | | England | | Smith et al. 2005 |
| Lorton Anticline | Cumbria | England | | Brenchley & Rawson 2006 |
| Lothersdale Anticline | Yorkshire | England | E&W 69 | Brenchley & Rawson 2006 |
| Lowick Anticline | Cumbria | England | E&W 48 | Brenchley & Rawson 2006 |
| Ludlow - Ledwyche Anticline | | England | | BGS:BRG 10 |
| Ludlow Anticline | Shropshire | England | | Toghill, P 2006; Smith et al. 2005; Earp & Hains 1971 |
| Lulworth Banks Anticline | Dorset | England | E&W 342/3 | |
| Lulworth Crumple | Dorset | England | E&W 342/3 | |
| Lydney Syncline | | | | Welch, FBA & Trotter, FM 1961 |
| Lynton Anticline | Somerset | England | E&W 278, 293 | |
| Machynlleth Anticline | | Wales | Mid Wales & Marches 250K | |
| Madeley Syncline | | England | E&W 153 | |
| Maes y Gamfa Anticline | | Wales | E&W 150 | |
| Main Syncline (Forest of Dean) | Gloucestershire | England | | BGS:BRG 16 |
| Mansfield Anticline | | England | E&W 112 | |
| Matlock Anticline | | England | E&W 112 | |
| Marshwood Pericline | Dorset | England | | Mem E&W 328etc, GA Guide22 |
| May Hill Anticline | | England | E&W 216 | |
| Meall a'Bhobuir Synform | | Scotland | Sc 54E | |
| Meall Chuaich Syncline | | Scotland | Sc 64W | |
| Meall Nathrach Antiform | | Scotland | Sc 63W | |
| Meall Reamhar Synform | | Scotland | Sc 55W, Sc 64E | |
| Melbourne Syncline | | England | | Smith et al. 2005 |
| Melton Mowbray Anticline | | England | | BGS:BRG 10 |
| Micheldever Syncline | Hampshire | England | E&W 283/299/300 | |
| Middleton Tyas Anticline | | England | E&W 41 | |
| Midlothian Syncline | | Scotland | | Trewin (ed) 2002 |
| Mixon - Morridge Anticline | | England | E&W 111 | |
| Moel Geffylog Anticline | Clwyd | Wales | | Mem E&W 95/107 |
| Moel Hebog Syncline | Gwynedd | Wales | E&W 119 | |
| Morar Anticline | | Scotland | | BGS:BRG 2 |
| Moseley Syncline | | England | E&W 153 | |
| Mount Blair Anticline | | Scotland | Sc 56W | |
| Mount Pleasant Syncline | | England | | Smith et al. 2005 |
| Mounton Syncline | | | | Welch, FBA & Trotter, FM 1961 |
| Mynydd y Llyn Anticline | | Wales | E&W 149 | |
| Nailsea Syncline | | England | | BGS:BRG 16 |
| Nant Mawr Syncline | Clwyd | Wales | | Mem E&W 95/107 |
| Netherfield Anticline | | England | E&W 320/321 (text) | |
| Netherton Anticline | | England | E&W 167 | BGS:BRG 10 |
| New Hall Syncline | | England | | Smith et al. 2005 |
| Nicky Nook Anticline | Lancashire | England | E&W 67 | |
| Norton-Ridgeway Anticline | | England | E&W 100 | |
| Norwood Anticline | Yorkshire | England | E&W 69 | |
| Nuneaton Anticline | | England | | Smith et al. 2005 |
| Oaken Head Syncline | | England | E&W 59 | |
| Oakwoodhill Syncline | | England | E&W 302 | |
| Ord Syncline | | Scotland | Sc 71W | |
| Orielton Anticline | Pembrokeshire | Wales | E&W 244/5 | |
| Oxfordshire Coalfield Syncline | | England | E&W 235 | |
| Oxwich Bay Syncline | Glamorgan | Wales | | Brief expln to E&W 247, 2011 |
| Oxwich Point Anticline | Glamorgan | Wales | | Brief expln to E&W 247, 2011 |
| Overseal Anticline | | England | | Smith et al. 2005 |
| Oystermouth Syncline | Glamorgan | Wales | | Brief expln to E&W 247, 2011 |
| Painswick Trough (Syncline) | | England | | BGS:BRG 16 |
| Pandy Twdwr Anticline | Clwyd | Wales | | Mem E&W 95/107 |
| Park Mill Anticline | Glamorgan | Wales | | Brief expln to E&W 247, 2011 |
| Patcham Syncline | | England | E&W 318/333 | |
| Pembroke Syncline | Pembrokeshire | Wales | E&W 244/5 | |
| Pen Cafnau Anticline | | Wales | E&W 193 | |
| Pendle Monocline | | England | | Brenchley & Rawson 2006 |
| Pennine Anticline | | England | E&W 77 | Brenchley & Rawson 2006 |
| Pennine Line | | England | | Brenchley & Rawson 2006 |
| Pennine Monocline | | England | | Smith et al. 2005 |
| Pentre Bach Syncline | | Wales | E&W 213 | |
| Penton Linns Anticline | Cumbria | England | E&W 20 | Day, 1970 |
| Pewsey Anticline | | England | E&W 283 | |
| Pewsey-Kingsclere Anticline | Hampshire/Wiltshire | England | | |
| Plaistow Syncline | | England | E&W 301 | |
| Plantation Farm Anticline | Lancashire | England | E&W 67 | |
| Plynlimon Anticline | | Wales | Mid Wales & Marches 250K | |
| Poll an Droighinn Antiform | Sutherland | Scotland | | G & K 2011 |
| Pont Lliw Syncline | Glamorgan | Wales | | Brief expln to E&W 247, 2011 |
| Poppit Anticline | | Wales | E&W 193 | |
| Port Erin Anticline | | Isle of Man | IoM (50K special sheet) | Brenchley & Rawson 2006 |
| Portsdown Anticline | Hampshire | England | E&W 316 | |
| Potteries Syncline | | England | E&W 110 | BGS:BRG 10 |
| Povey Syncline | | England | E&W 100 | |
| Poxwell Anticline | Dorset | England | | |
| Poxwell Pericline | Dorset | England | E&W 341/2 | GA Guide 22 |
| Poynton Syncline | | England | E&W 98 | |
| Prees Syncline | | England | | BGS:BRG 10; Toghill P. 2006; Plant, JA et al. 1999 |
| Purbeck Anticline | Dorset | England | E&W 342/3 | GA Guide 22 |
| Purbeck Monocline | Dorset | England | E&W 342/3 | Mem E&W 328etc |
| Pwlldu Head Syncline | Glamorgan | Wales | | Brief expln to E&W 247, 2011 |
| Pwllygranant Syncline | | Wales | E&W 193 | |
| Pyecombe Anticline | | England | E&W 318/333 | |
| Quantock Anticline | Somerset | England | | BGS:BRG 16 |
| Quernmore Syncline | | England | E&W 59 | |
| Radstock Syncline | | England | | BGS:BRG 16 |
| Rhiwnant Anticline | | Wales | E&W 196 | Brenchley & Rawson 2006 |
| Ribchester Syncline | Lancashire | England | E&W 67 | |
| Ridge Anticline | | | | Welch, FBA & Trotter, FM 1961 |
| Ridgeway Anticline | Pembrokeshire | Wales | E&W 244/5 | |
| Ritton Castle Syncline (Llan Syncline) | Shropshire | England | | Toghill P. 2006 |
| Robin Hood's Bay Dome | Yorkshire | England | | BGS:BRG9 |
| Rodhuish Syncline | Somerset | England | | Proc.Geol.Ass'n. vol76, pt1. 1965 |
| Rolleston Anticline | | England | E&W 126 | |
| Romiley Anticline | | England | E&W 98 | |
| Rudyard Anticline | | England | E&W 110 | |
| Sageston Anticline | Pembrokeshire | Wales | E&W 244/5 | |
| Salsburgh Anticline | | Scotland | | Trewin (ed) 2002 |
| Sandown Anticline | | England | | Brenchley & Rawson 2006 |
| Sarclet Anticline | | Scotland | | BGS:BRG 2 |
| Scafell Syncline | Cumbria | England | E&W 38 | BGS:BRG 7 |
| Scarborough Dome | Yorkshire | England | | BGS:BRG9 |
| Sedgeley and Dudley Anticline | | England | | BGS:BRG 10 |
| Sgonnan Mor Anticline | Sutherland | Scotland | | G & K 2011 |
| Sgonnan Mor Syncline | Sutherland | Scotland | | Trewin (ed) 2002, G & K 2011 |
| Shaffalong Syncline | | England | E&W 110 | |
| Shambles Syncline | Dorset | England | | GA Guide22 |
| Shelve Anticline | Shropshire | England | E&W 151 | Toghill, P. 2006 |
| Shipley Syncline | | England | E&W 125 | |
| Shirenewton Anticline | | | | Welch, FBA & Trotter, FM 1961 |
| Sidlaw Anticline | | Scotland | UK (north) 625K, Sc 49 | Trewin (ed) 2002 |
| Singleton Anticline | West Sussex | England | E&W 317/332 | |
| Skipton Anticline | Yorkshire | England | E&W 69 | |
| Slaidburn Anticline | Lancashire | England | E&W 67 | |
| Snowdon Syncline | | Wales | UK (south) 625K | Brenchley & Rawson 2006 |
| Somerton Anticline | | England | | BGS:BRG 16 |
| Spring Bottom Syncline | Dorset | England | | GA Guide 22 |
| Sronlairig Dome | | Scotland | Sc 73E | |
| St Florence Syncline | Pembrokeshire | Wales | E&W 244/5 | |
| Stanton Syncline | | England | E&W 111 | |
| Staple Edge Monocline | | England | | Welch, FBA & Trotter, FM 1961; BGS:BRG 16 |
| Stewnor Anticline | Carmarthenshire | Wales | | Brenchley & Rawson 2006 |
| Stewnor Anticline | Cumbria | England | E&W 48 | |
| Stirchley Anticline | | England | E&W 153 | |
| Stob Ban Syncline (*or 'Stob Ban Synform') | | Scotland | Sc 63W* | Trewin (ed) 2002 |
| Stockbridge Anticline | Hampshire | England | E&W 299/300 | |
| Stourbridge Syncline | | England | E&W 167 | |
| Strath Dionard Antiform | | Scotland | | Trewin (ed) 2002 |
| Strathmore Syncline | | Scotland | UK (north) 625K, Sc 39W, Sc 48W | Trewin (ed) 2002 |
| Sutton Maddocks Anticline | | England | E&W 153 | |
| Sykes Anticline | Lancashire | England | E&W 67 | |
| Taddington - Bakewell Anticline | | England | | Smith et al. 2005 |
| Tarbert Monoform | Argyll & Bute | Scotland | Sc 29W, Sc 36 | |
| Tarskavaig Synform | | Scotland | Sc 71W | |
| Taythes Anticline | | England | | BGS:BRG 7 |
| Tayvallich Syncline | Argyll & Bute | Scotland | Sc 28E | |
| Teifi Anticline | | Wales | E&W 195 | Brenchley & Rawson 2006 |
| Teifi Anticlinorium | | Wales | | |
| Thornbury Anticline | | England | | Welch, FBA & Trotter, FM 1961 |
| Thornley Anticline | Lancashire | England | E&W 67 | |
| Thornton-Balgonie Syncline | | Scotland | Sc 40E | |
| Thursley Syncline | | England | E&W 301 | |
| Tidenham Chase Syncline | | | | Welch, FBA & Trotter, FM 1961 |
| Tirbacas Anticline | Glamorgan | Wales | | Brief expln to E&W 247, 2011 |
| Titterstone Clee Syncline | Shropshire | England | Mid Wales & Marches 250K | Toghill P. 2006 |
| Tollie (Thollaidh) Antiform | | Scotland | Sc 91/100 | BGS:BRG 2; Trewin (ed) 2002 |
| Torridon Antiform | | Scotland | | BGS:BRG 2; Trewin (ed) 2002 |
| Trannon Syncline | | Wales | E&W 164 | |
| Tregibby Anticline | | Wales | E&W 193 | |
| Tre-pys-llygod Syncline | Clwyd | Wales | | Mem E&W 95/107 |
| Trimdon Anticline | Durham | England | | BGS:BRG 7 |
| Troway Anticline | | England | E&W 100 | |
| Tryfan Anticline | Gwynedd | Wales | E&W 106 | |
| Tylwch Anticline | | Wales | E&W 164, 179 | |
| Tywi Anticline | | Wales | E&W 196 | Brenchley & Rawson 2006 |
| Uddingston Syncline | | Scotland | | Trewin (ed) 2002 |
| Ulpha Syncline | Cumbria | England | | BGS:BRG 7 |
| Upton Syncline | Dorset | England | | GA Guide22 |
| Upwey Syncline | Dorset | England | E&W 328 | GA Guide22 |
| Usk Anticline | Monmouthshire | Wales | E&W 232 | Brenchley & Rawson 2006 |
| Vale of Pickering Syncline | Yorkshire | England | | BGS:BRG9 |
| Vale of Wardour Anticline | | England | | |
| Walliswood Anticline | | England | E&W 302 | |
| Walls Syncline | Shetland | Scotland | | BGS:BRG 1 |
| Wardour Monocline | | England | E&W 298 | |
| Warminghurst Syncline | | England | E&W 318/333 | |
| Watsness - Browland Anticline | Shetland | Scotland | | BGS:BRG 1 |
| Waun Marteg Syncline | | Wales | E&W 179 | |
| Weald Anticline | | England | | |
| Weald-Artois Anticline | | England | | |
| Wealden Anticline | | England | | Brenchley & Rawson 2006 |
| Weeton Anticline | Lancashire | England | E&W 67 | |
| Welbeck Trough | | England | E&W 112 | |
| Werrington Anticline | | England | | Smith et al. 2005 |
| Wessington Anticline | | England | E&W 112 | |
| Westbury Anticline | | England | E&W 264 | |
| West Mainland Anticline | Shetland | Scotland | | BGS:BRG 1 |
| Western Anticline | | England | | BGS:BRG 10; Smith et al. 2005 |
| Westfield Syncline | | Scotland | | Trewin (ed) 2002 |
| Westmorland Monocline | | England | | Brenchley & Rawson 2006; BGS:BRG 7 |
| Weymouth Anticline | Dorset | England | E&W 341/2 | Mem E&W 328etc, GA Guide 22 |
| Whitby Syncline | Yorkshire | England | | BGS:BRG9 |
| Whitewell Anticline | Lancashire | England | E&W 67 | |
| Whitwell Anticline | | England | E&W 100 | |
| Wigpool Syncline | | | | Welch, FBA & Trotter, FM 1961 |
| Williamson Park Anticline | | England | E&W 59 | |
| Williamthorpe Syncline | | England | E&W 112 | |
| Windmill Syncline | | England | E&W 153 | |
| Winchester-East Meon Anticline | Hampshire | England | E&W 299/300/316 | |
| Winchester-King's Somborne Syncline | Hampshire | England | E&W 299/300 | |
| Wisborough Green Anticline | | England | E&W 301 | |
| Withycombe Anticline | Somerset | England | | Proc.Geol.Ass'n. vol76, pt1. 1965 |
| Woodford Anticline | | England | E&W 298 | |
| Woolhope Anticline | | England | E&W 215 | |
| Woolhope Dome | | England | | |
| Worcester Syncline | Worcestershire | England | | Welch, FBA & Trotter, FM 1961; BGS:BRG 16 |
| Worthing Syncline | | England | E&W 318/333 | |
| Wylye Anticline | | England | E&W 298 | |

=== List of Disturbances ===
The following named features comprise both faulting and folding;

Sortable table of named disturbances
| Disturbance name | County | Country | BGS map sheet | book reference/s |
|---|---|---|---|---|
| Burtreeford Disturbance | | England | E&W 19 | BGS:BRG 7 |
| Carreg Cennen Disturbance | | Wales | | |
| Clun Forest Disturbance | | Wales | | |
| Cribarth Disturbance | | Wales | | |
| Llandyfaelog Disturbance | | Wales | | |
| Llannon (or Llanon) Disturbance | | Wales | | |
| Neath Disturbance | | Wales | | Brief expln to E&W 247, 2011 |
| Pontyclerc Disturbance | | Wales | | |
| Saron Disturbance | | Wales | | |
| Silverdale Disturbance | | England | | BGS:BRG 7 |
| Trimsaran Disturbance | | Wales | | |

== See also ==
- List of geological faults of England
- List of geological faults of Northern Ireland
- List of geological faults of Scotland
- List of geological faults of Wales
- Geological structure of Great Britain
