= Eskdale Anticline =

Geological feature of North Yorkshire, England

- Whitby Harbour Fault; Eskdale Fault; Whitby Fault
- Cross-section of rocks at Whitby Bay including types of rock. This is not to scale and is simplified.

- Location of fault
- Coordinates: 54.491°N 0.612°W
- Country: England
- Region: North Yorkshire

Characteristics
- Depth: 20 metres (66 ft)

The Eskdale Anticline is a dip-slip fault at Whitby in North Yorkshire, England. The anticline was thought to have stretched for approximately 20 kilometres (12 mi) in a north–south direction underneath the mouth of the River Esk in Whitby, with a depth of 200 feet (61 m). However, modern geological studies have cast doubt on this, with a suggested displacement of only 12 metres (39 ft).

== Description ==
The Eskdale Anticline was thought to have started north west of Scarborough and stretched for approximately 20 kilometres (12 mi) along a north–south axis, and ending just off the coast of the River Esk mouth at Whitby in North Yorkshire. This results in a dip-slip fault of what was listed as a 61-metre (200 ft) shift between the east and west cliffs at Whitby, where the West Cliff has sandstones covered by boulder drift, with a beach below of fine sand. The opposite side (the East Cliff), is composed of alum shale and has a rocky foreshore. The southern end of the anticline reaches as far as Rigg Mill Beck near to Ruswarp, and the northern end curves westwards as it ends under the North Sea. The fault displaces the Upper Lias Shales below sea level at the West Cliff, but they rise up again in the vicinity of Sandsend. The displacement difference between the East and West Cliffs is approximately 12 metres (39 ft).

Evidence points towards the River Esk having a pre-glacial channel that entered the North Sea east of Sandsend, but the effect of the faulting anticline, diverted the river to exit at Whitby. Henry attests to the gorge that the river now flows through at Larpool in Whitby to the blocking of the pre-glacial channel by boulder clay. As the anticline runs along the river bed and mouth at Whitby, it divides the town and harbour in two; the West Pier lies on sandstone, and the East Pier, some 90 yards (82 m) apart, lies on the alum shale. Both cliffs at Whitby have oolitic strata, but on the West Cliff, these are 75 feet (23 m) lower than on the east cliff. Additionally, the East Cliff has an observable Dogger Bed (ironstone), but the seam on the West Cliff is below the normal water line, this led to a suggestion of the fault being deeper than it actually is. In his book, A geological survey of the Yorkshire coast, George Young estimates that "...we can scarcely reckon the amount of the slip less than 100 feet..." That a fault exists is widely accepted, but in the 20th century, J. E. Hemingway consulted paleobotanical and structural evidence to refute the claims that the cliffs were formed at different times. Brumhead attests the fault to be no more than 12 metres (39 ft) in depth.

In 1924, before the revised theory regarding the fault came out, both Kendall and Wroot state that the British Geological Survey estimated the depth as 200 feet (61 m).

In the 1930s, the anticline was successfully drilled for gas, however, its location has the ability to affect mining operations for potash and polyhalite. This was considered in the planning phases for Woodsmith Mine.

Several names have been used for the fault, namely Eskdale Anticline, Whitby Fault, Whitby harbour Fault, and Eskdale Fault.

== See also ==
- List of geological folds in Great Britain
