= Winchester-King's Somborne Syncline =

The Winchester-King's Somborne Syncline is one of a series of parallel east-west trending folds in the Cretaceous chalk of Hampshire. It lies at the western end of the South Downs, immediately to the north of the Winchester-East Meon Anticline and east of Salisbury Plain.

== Structure ==
The fold axis runs for around 40 kilometres (25 mi) from north of East Tytherley in the west, between Winchester and Kings Worthy, towards Four Marks in the east. To the north-east of Winchester the fold axis is followed by the valley of the River Itchen, which turns abruptly south to cut across the structure and the Winchester-East Meon Anticline to the south.

Parallel folds to the north include the Stockbridge Anticline and the Micheldever Syncline. To the south-west across the River Test is the similar Alderbury-Mottisfont Syncline. As with other nearby folds, the structure is controlled by movement of fault blocks within the Jurassic strata below.

== See also ==
List of geological folds in Great Britain
