= Geology of the New Forest =

This article describes the geology of the New Forest, a national park in Hampshire, in Southern England.

The geology of the New Forest comprises a succession of largely flat-lying sedimentary rocks of Palaeogene age laid down between about 66 and about 34 million years ago, in the centre of a sedimentary basin known as the Hampshire Basin. These are overlain by a variety of superficial deposits. There are few rock exposures beyond limited outcrops in the banks of streams, the faces of working and abandoned gravel pits, and some low coastal cliffs. However, temporary exposures during construction works and boreholes have added to earth scientists’ understanding of the area.

In broad terms, the oldest rocks occupy the northern part of the area with progressively younger rocks seen to the south, approaching the Solent coast. As elsewhere, the names of particular rock strata (and higher level groups) sometimes change as geological knowledge expands and research correlates strata in one area with those of another. Older literature and maps may therefore refer to different names.

== Concealed older strata ==
A borehole at Marchwood on the edge of the Test estuary just northeast of the national park found Jurassic and Triassic strata at depth, and penetrated what are thought to be Devonian rocks beneath.

== Cretaceous ==
The area is underlain at shallower depths by the pure marine limestones of the Chalk Group though, within the park, these rocks are not seen at the surface except in a very small area on its extreme northwestern margin in the parish of Hale where the Portsdown Chalk Formation is exposed. Elsewhere its presence has been proven in boreholes e.g. at Bunker's Hill, Copythorne.

== Palaeogene ==
The Chalk is overlain unconformably by the clays and sands of the Reading Formation, which were deposited during the Palaeocene, the earliest part of the Palaeogene period. These rocks outcrop between Woodgreen and Redlynch. The formation forms a part of the Lambeth Group.

This formation is in turn overlain by the London Clay Formation, the outcrop of which can be traced from the Fordingbridge area via Redlynch northeast to Whiteparish. It contains sandy units within it referred to as the Nursling Sand and Whitecliff Sand members. Typically around 100m thick, the formation forms a part of the Thames Group and is considered of early Eocene age. Both the Reading Formation and the London Clay are pebbly at their bases.

The London Clay is unconformably overlain by the sands and clays of the Bracklesham Group, which is divided into several units; the Wittering, Marsh Farm and Poole formations and after a further break in deposition, the younger Branksome Sand, Boscombe Sand and Selsey Sand formations.

The sands and clays of the Barton Group overlie those of the Bracklesham Group; in succession these are the Barton Clay, Chama Sand and Becton Sand formations. The Warren Hill Sand is a separately mappable ‘member’ within the Barton Clay as is the Becton Bunny Member within the Becton Sand.

The uppermost and hence youngest of all the ‘solid’ rock units within the park is the Headon Formation (forming a part of the Solent Group, which comprises clays, silts, and sands laid down in freshwater conditions. However deposition under marine conditions is indicated by the Lyndhurst Member—a separately mappable rock unit that divides the formation into upper and lower parts. It forms much of the higher ground to the south and southeast of Lyndhurst.

== Geological structures ==
The geology is overwhelmingly flat-lying with dips of no more than one or two degrees in a generally southerly direction. Some minor folding is seen in Barton Group and Headon Formation strata around Burley. Though geological faults are known to affect the subsurface, few are evident at the surface.

== Superficial deposits ==
A suite of unconsolidated materials have been deposited during the Quaternary period and include alluvial clays, silts, sands and gravels on the floors of the many smaller watercourses within the area. The main river valleys, including those of the Avon, Beaulieu and Lymington rivers, are floored by alluvium; sand and gravel laid down in the river channels themselves and silt and clay deposited as the rivers overflow their banks during times of flood. Much the most extensive deposits are those of river terraces of which fourteen are identified at successive levels across the area of the national park. Some are referred to as the 'Plateau Gravels'. Tidal flats composed of clay and silt along the Solent coast are extensive, particularly around the mouths of the Beaulieu and Lymington rivers. Similar deposits are found around Calshot at the end of Southampton Water. Patches of head are recorded in places, most especially on the steeper ground of the valley sides in the north and west of the national park. These deposits typically reflect the underlying solid geology and derive from solifluction and slope wash.

There are chalybeate i.e. iron-rich springs in places, Irons Well (or, earlier ‘Lepers Well’) near Fritham being one such example.

== See also ==
- Geology of Hampshire
- Hampshire Basin
