= Warnford =

Village and parish in Hampshire, England

Coordinates: 51.003803°N 1.109848°W

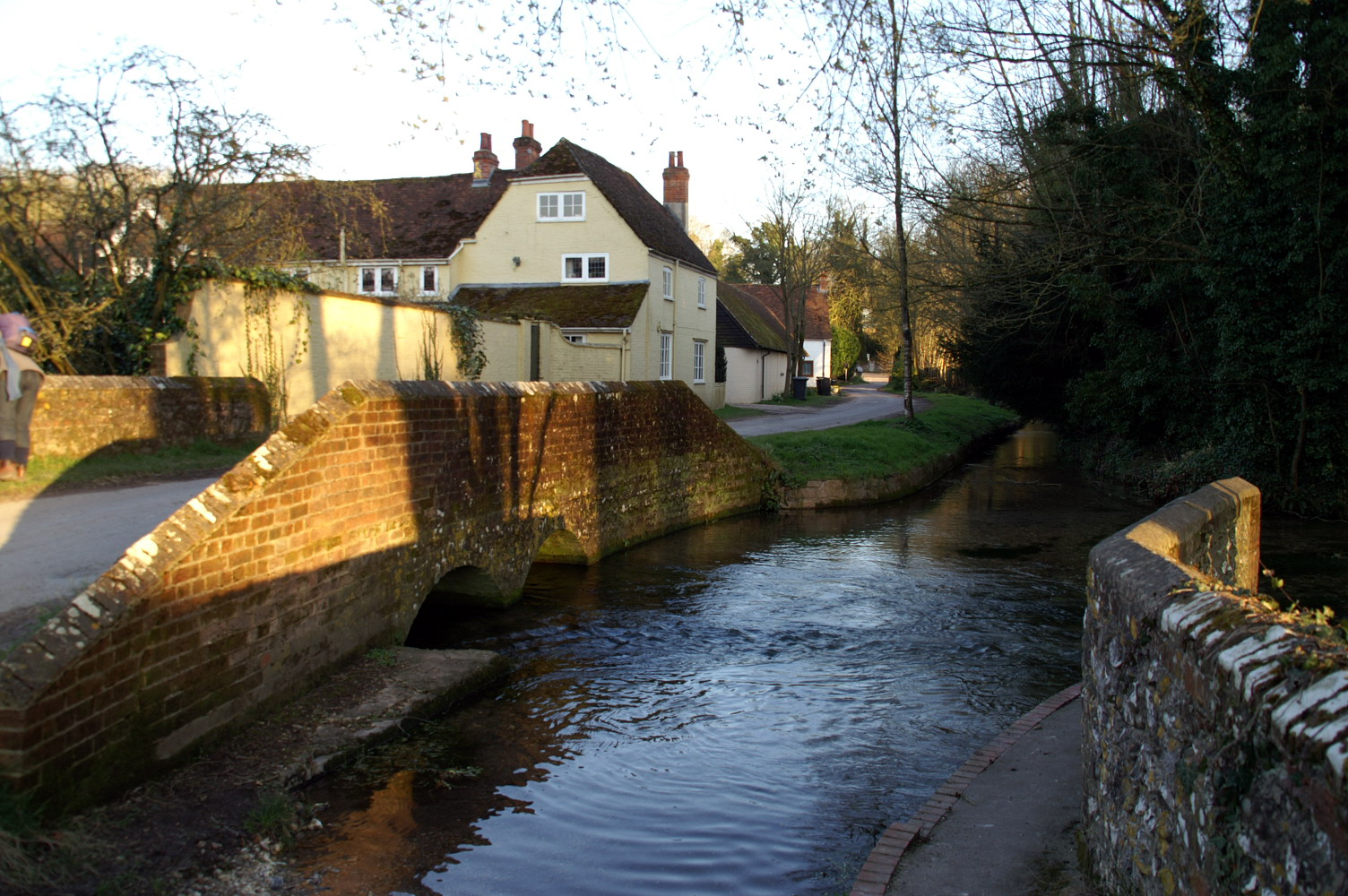

- Location within Hampshire
- Population: 220
- OS grid reference: SU624231
- Civil parish: Warnford
- District: City of Winchester
- Shire county: Hampshire
- Region: South East
- Country: England
- Sovereign state: United Kingdom
- Post town: Southampton
- Postcode district: SO32
- Dialling code: 01730
- Police: Hampshire and Isle of Wight
- Fire: Hampshire and Isle of Wight
- Ambulance: South Central
- UK Parliament: Winchester

Warnford is a village and civil parish in the City of Winchester district of Hampshire, England. The parish covers 1,283 hectares (3,170 acres). The village lies on the A32 in the upper valley of the River Meon between West Meon and Exton. The population in 2024 was estimated at 254. The village is rural in character, with most of the buildings along River Lane, Lippen Lane and Hayden Lane.

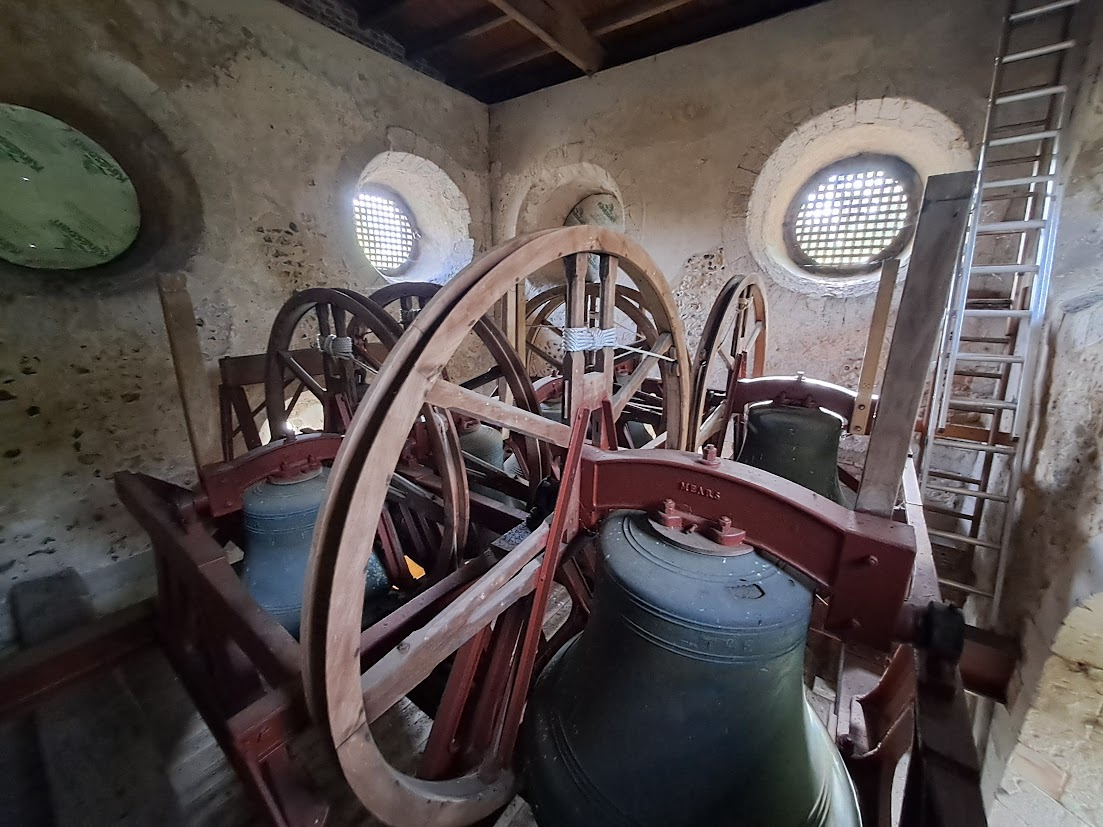
The bells in the tower of the Church of Our Lady in Warnford

The George and Falcon pub and hotel, which is grade II listed and dates to the 18th century, is located on the A32 near the centre of the village.

The Church of Our Lady, located in Warnford Park to the south of the village, is Grade I listed.

The village hall is located in Lippen Lane close to the centre of the village and was converted from a farm shop, having been earlier a pig farm laboratory. It was given to the village in 1998 by the owner of the Warnford Estate. The hall has a single room which can accommodate up to 100 people and is available for hire by the hour.

Warnford Playground in Lippen Lane was given by the family of R. P. Chester in his memory in 1978 for the benefit of parishioners. It is managed by a charitable trust. It is open to the public, but there is very limited parking and no facilities such as toilets.

== History ==
There is evidence in the form of barrows or burial mounds of occupation from early times. The barrow and associated Saxon boundary bank at Sheepbridge is registered as a Scheduled Monument. Both are referred to in a land charter dating from the time of King Aethelstan. The Domesday book records Warnford and also Upwarnford, which is believed to have covered the northern part of the parish.

The Church of Our Lady is of Saxon origin but was rebuilt in the 12th century and contains relics of an earlier Saxon church. The ruins of the 13th century St. John's or King John's House, also Grade I listed, are behind the church. The church and St John's House are accessible via a public footpath from the A32. Warnford Park is itself Grade II listed as a park and garden, but is not open to the public except on Sundays in February when a "snowdrop walk" is opened up in aid of the church, with the permission of the landowner. The park was the site of the manor house, renamed "Belmont" in the 19th century and demolished in the 1950s. It was requisitioned by the War Office in World War II and never reoccupied by the owners afterwards.

The parish contains a number of other listed buildings, including the farmhouse, well house and granary at Bere Farm, Abbey House (formerly the rectory), North Lodge and the adjacent gateway into Warnford Park, Papermill Cottage and Riversdown House. None of these is open to the public. The hall at Riversdown house dates to 1327 and was probably originally around 12 by 9 meters.

== Air crash ==
On 4 April 1944 a Royal Air Force, Airspeed Horsa I (LG999) was taking part in a training exercise out of RAF Keevil. The glider was being towed by a Short Stirling (LJ842) and during the training the Stirling struck trees. This resulted in the Airspeed Horsa I crashing in the park, killing the two pilots and all 24 paratroopers. To date, the crash remains the second deadliest involving a glider. The Stirling aircraft later crashed near Romsey, killing all six crew.

== Geography ==
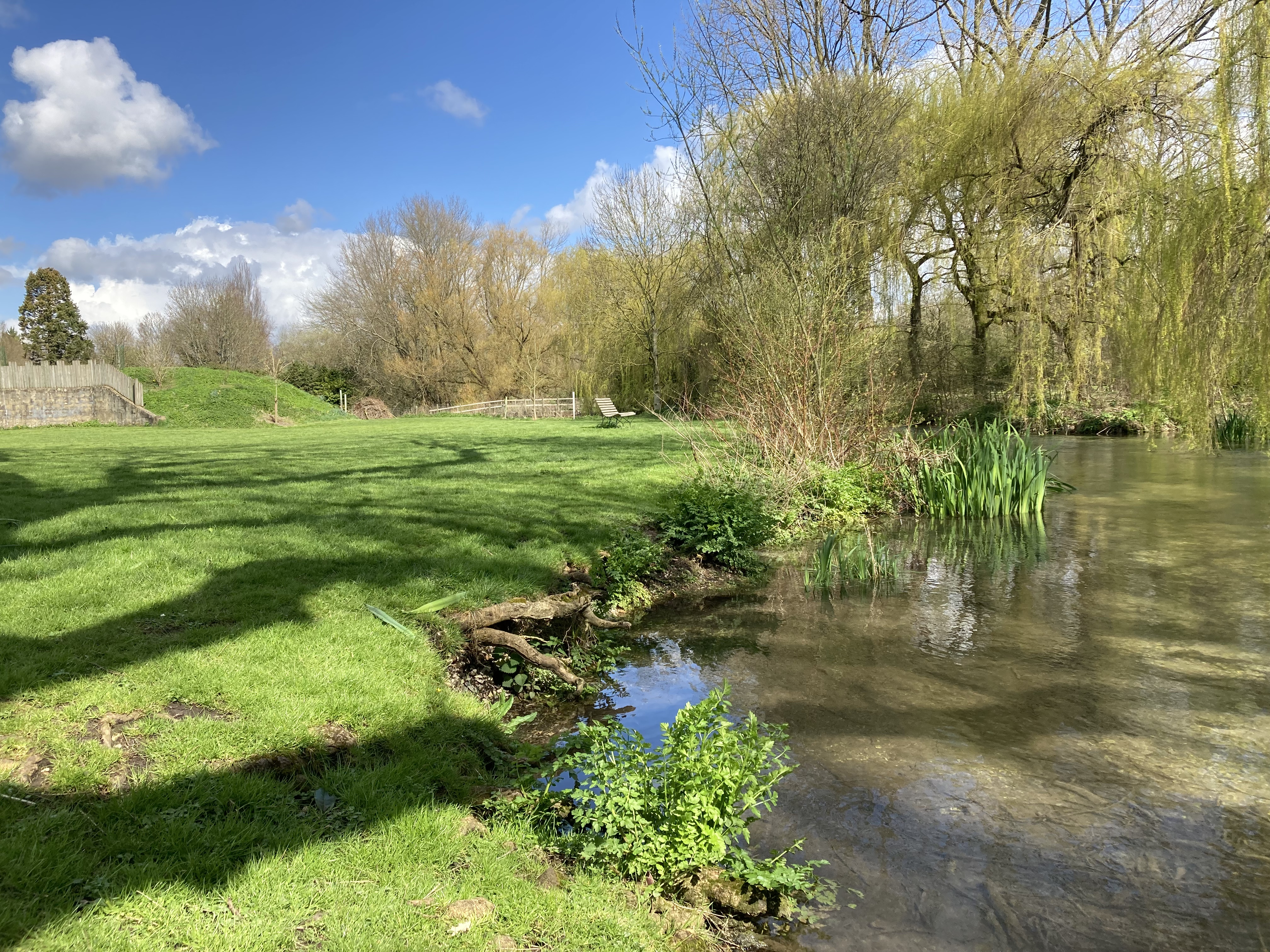
River Meon at Warnford Playground

The parish is roughly triangular and includes the village itself and about a mile of the Meon Valley. The centre of the village in the more recent past was the crossroads by the George & Falcon, but the demolition of buildings for road widening, fast traffic on the A32 and closure of the village shops has shifted the focus to the main area of housing along River Lane and Lippen Lane. There are also houses in Hayden Lane and Wheely Down Road, with outlying farms and houses at Wheely Farm, Riversdown, Bere and Lower Peake. From the crossroads by the pub Hayden Lane climbs a spur of the downs, rising to Old Winchester Hill and onwards to Clanfield. Just west of the village Wheely Down Road branches from the A32, heading up a side valley and then climbing onto the Hampshire Downs plateau on its way to Winchester.

The River Meon flows through the village. In summer the section between West Meon and Warnford is often dry, but there are major springs at Moorhen Trout Fishery and just below it at Warnford Upper Pond, so the river through the village is always in water. There is on the ground evidence of an extensive system of channels fed from sluices in Warnford Upper Pond and higher up the valley at Sheepbridge which fed water to meadows on the west side of the valley. There is a very attractive section through the playground. The river flows under the A32 into the park and feeds a lake, originally the pond for a paper mill close to the A32 at the junction with Peake New Road.

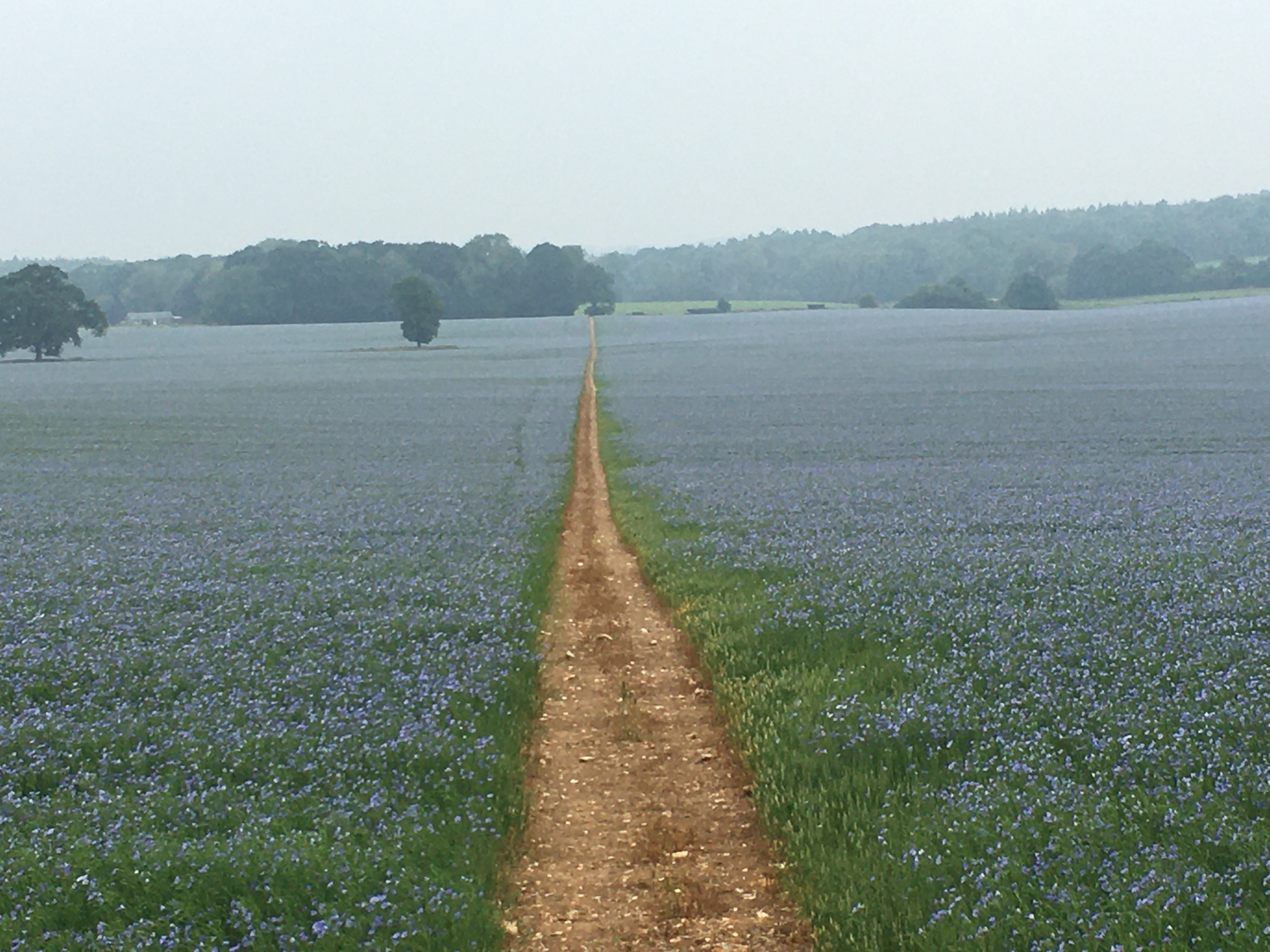
Farmland on Warnford Chalk Plateau

The land rises to an extensive area of chalk plateau to the north and west, extending from Bere Farm across Pinks Hill to the side valley that carries Wheely Down Road. There are beautiful views across the valley from the public footpaths which climb Pinks Hill. The Beacon Hill National Nature Reserve and SSSI is at the western end of the parish, a chalk hill some 201 metres (659 ft) high flanked by numerous steep-sided dry valleys. Beacon Hill is accessible via the Monarch's Way long-distance footpath which crosses the valley in Warnford. The village was by-passed by the former Meon Valley Railway (now the "Meon Valley Trail" footpath and cycleway) which runs down the east side of the valley.

To the south and east of the village Hayden Lane crosses the old railway line and climbs a spur of the chalk downs to the Old Winchester Hill National Nature Reserve, which is just outside the eastern end of the parish . The South Downs Way links these two nature reserves and shares short sections of the Monarch's Way either side of the parish. The route across the valley has been contentious and was the subject of public inquiries in 2004 and 2006. Although a footpath route via Beacon Hill Lane and Peake New Road was approved after the second inquiry, the inspector's decision was overturned in the High Court and this route has not been pursued further by Hampshire County Council. Ordnance Survey maps now show a southerly route past Beacon Hill via Exton, implemented as a temporary measure but now in place for the foreseeable future.

== Business, transport and land use ==
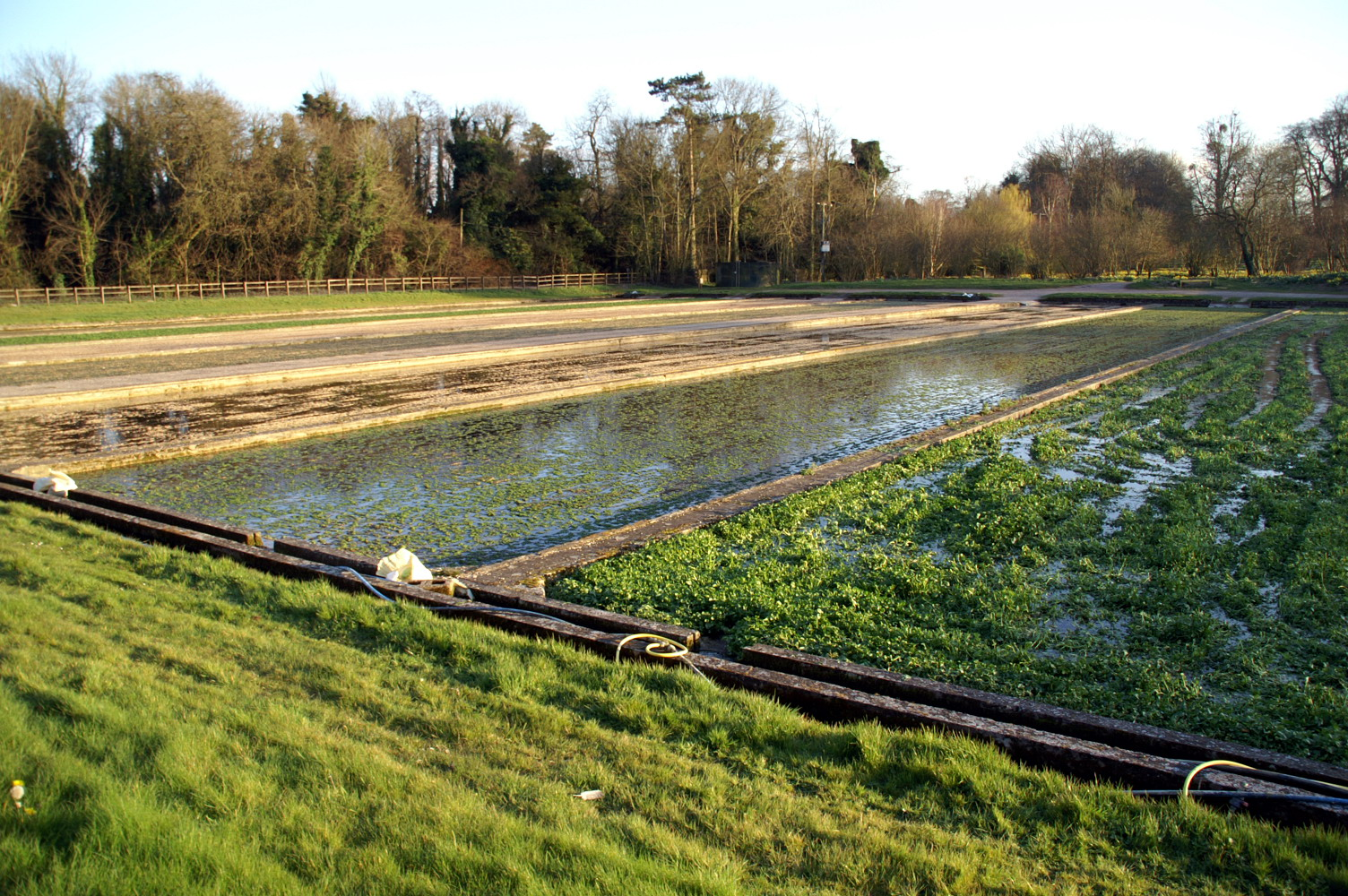
Watercress beds in Warnford

The primary land use in the parish is agriculture, including watercress beds. Major landowners are Gawthorpe Estates Ltd (Warnford Estate); MJI Farming Ltd (Abbey House Estate) and F R Horn (Beaconsfield Farm). Small businesses in the parish include Huxley Golf Ltd (The Old Grain Store); Moorhen Trout Fishery (Alton Road); Larksfield Nursery (Hayden Lane); Earle Brothers Motorcycles (The Long Barn) and Charles Normandale (Wheely Down Forge).

Public transport is limited. Stagecoach Bus 67 makes a morning trip on schooldays only to collect students heading to Petersfield. There is also a community bus operated by the Meon Valley Community Bus Association which makes regular weekly trips to Petersfield, Hedge End and Fareham.
