= Stockbridge Anticline =

The Stockbridge Anticline is one of a series of parallel east-west trending folds in the Cretaceous chalk of Hampshire. It lies at the western end of the South Downs, immediately to the north of the Winchester-King's Somborne Syncline and east of Salisbury Plain.

== Structure ==
The anticline axis runs for around 35 kilometres (22 mi) from around the Wallops, swinging south-south-east through Stockbridge and Crawley, between Micheldever and Kings Worthy, towards Medstead in the east.

Hills include Danebury and Chattis Hill to the west, Stockbridge Down, Woolbury, Chilbolton Down, Windmill Hill (Crawley) and Abbotstone Down.

Parallel folds to the south include the Winchester-East Meon Anticline and the Winchester-King's Somborne Syncline. To the north is the Micheldever Syncline. As with other nearby folds, the structure is controlled by movement of fault blocks within the Jurassic strata below.

== See also ==
List of geological folds in Great Britain
