= Alderbury-Mottisfont Syncline =

The Alderbury-Mottisfont Syncline is an east–west trending fold in the Cretaceous chalk of Hampshire. It lies to the north of the Dean Hill Anticline and south of Salisbury Plain.

== Structure ==
The syncline runs west about 16 kilometres (9.9 mi) from the River Test near Mottisfont to the Avon at Alderbury, south-east of Salisbury.

The centre of the syncline is occupied by palaeogene rocks of the Reading Formation, London Clay and Wittering Formation. To the north and south the chalk emerges. At the western end to the south-east of Salisbury the structure is cut by the Mere Fault.

== See also ==
List of geological folds in Great Britain
