= Henwood Down =

Hill in Hampshire, England

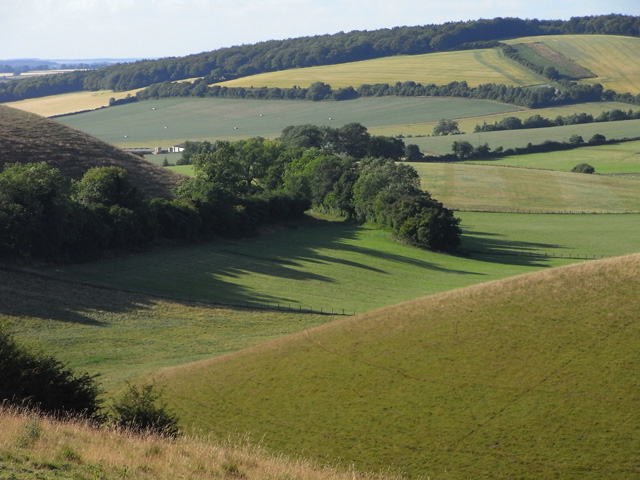
- Downland above Coombe, East Meon, with Henwood Down behind.

Highest point
- Elevation: 201 m (659 ft)
- Prominence: 64 m (210 ft)
- Parent peak: Butser Hill
- Listing: Tump
- Coordinates: 50°59′35″N 1°03′32″W

Geography
- Location: Hampshire, England
- Parent range: South Downs
- OS grid: SU661219
- Topo map: OS Landranger

Henwood Down is one of the highest points in the county of Hampshire, England, and in the South Downs, reaching a height of 201 metres (659 ft) above sea level. Its prominence of 64 metres qualifies it as a Tump.

Henwood Down rises about 1 mile west of the village of East Meon in Hampshire and around 2 kilometres northeast of Old Winchester Hill. The northern slopes are covered by mixed forest (Hen Wood), whilst the southern flanks are open. The South Downs Way runs over the southern spur of the hill. The hill is part of the Winchester-East Meon Anticline.
