= Beacon Hill, Warnford =

Hill near Warnford, Hampshire, England

Coordinates: 51.000431°N 1.139844°W

- Site of Special Scientific Interest
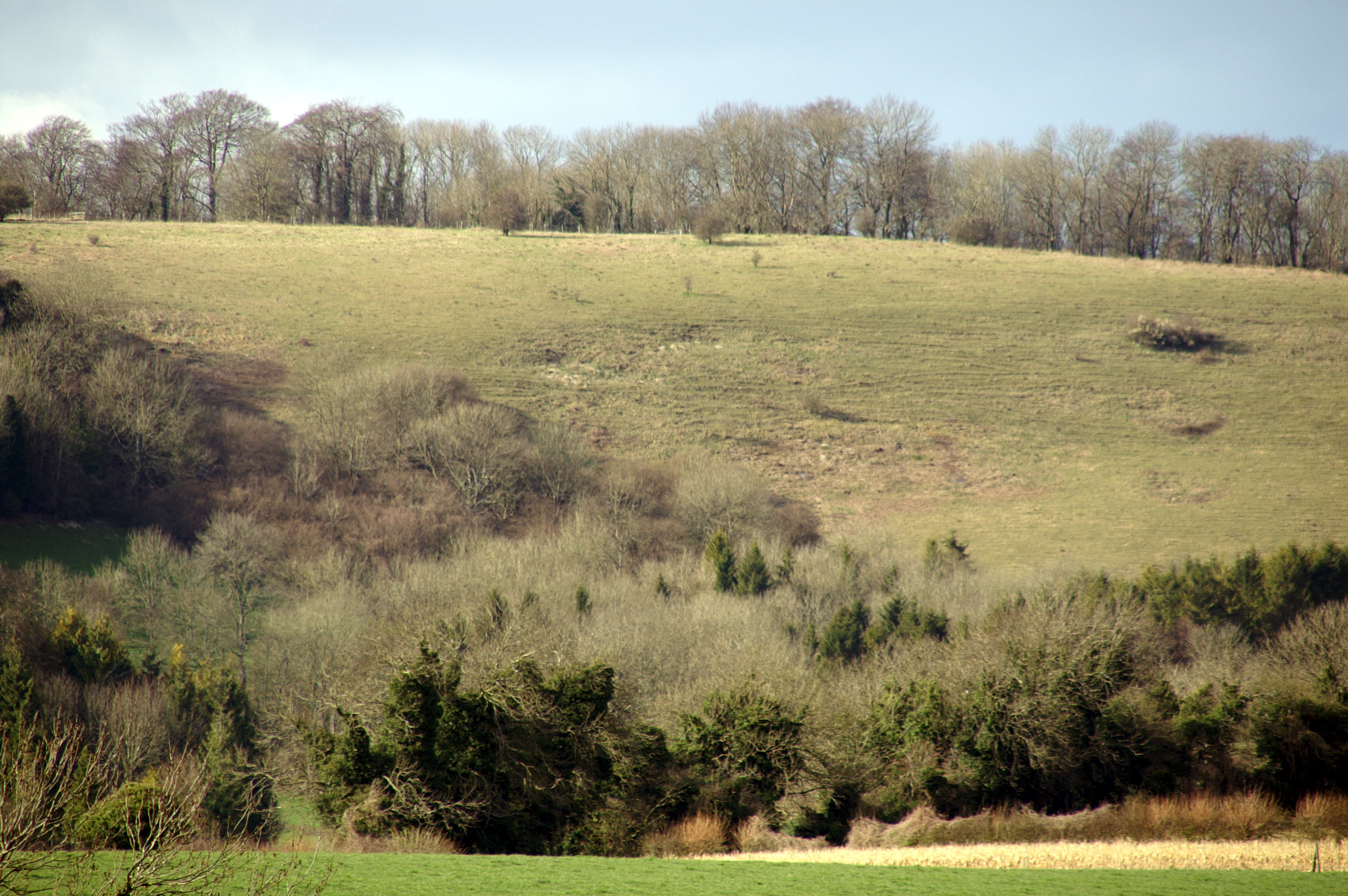
- Location of Beacon Hill, Warnford.
- Area of search: Hampshire
- Grid reference: SU 603 227
- Interest: Biological
- Area: 46.4 hectares (115 acres)
- Notification date: 1984
- Location map: Magic Map

There are two hills in Hampshire called Beacon Hill; the other one is near Burghclere.

Beacon Hill, Warnford is a 46.4-hectare (115-acre) biological Site of Special Scientific Interest west of Warnford in Hampshire. It is a Nature Conservation Review site, and an area of 40.1 hectares (99 acres) is a national nature reserve. There is a round barrow cemetery dating to the Late Neolithic or Bronze Age on the hill, and this is a scheduled monument.

== Location ==
The hill lies to the west of the Meon Valley and opposite Old Winchester Hill. It gives a commanding view over the Hampshire Basin to the south, from the lower Itchen Valley and New Forest, the Solent and Isle of Wight and round to Portsdown Hill (over which the top of Portsmouth's Spinnaker Tower can be seen). On the eastern side the view takes in the Meon Valley including Meonstoke and West Meon, and the South Downs including Old Winchester Hill and Butser Hill. The spire of Privett church can be seen to the north.

The hill is crossed by two long-distance footpaths, the South Downs Way and the Monarch's Way. Due to the fragile nature of the thin chalk soils there has been much controversy over routing. At present there are temporary routes to the north of the main summit via Warnford, and to the south via Exton.

== Site of Special Scientific Interest ==
The site consists of the steep slopes of a chalk spur on the western side of the Meon valley, covered by chalk grassland, beech / ash / hazel woodland and chalk scrub. There are two separate parts, which are not joined to each other. The main section centred on grid reference SU603227 consists of two divisions: 16.2 hectares (40 acres) of Beaconhill Beeches (mixed broadleaved and yew woodland), and 23.54 hectares (58.2 acres) of chalk grassland. The smaller, separate northern section (centred on grid reference SU604234) is a strip of grassland on a north-facing slope of the northern of the hill's two eastern spurs.

The grassland at the site has sheep's fescue (Festuca ovina), salad burnet (Sanguisorba minor) and common rock-rose (Helianthemum nummularium) as its dominant species. Other species present are horseshoe vetch (Hippocrepis comosa), yellow-wort (Blackstonia perfoliata), fragrant orchid (Gymnadenia conopsea) and clustered bellflower (Campanula glomerata).

The grassland supports several rarer species - rampion (Phyteuma tenerum), field fleawort (Senecio integrifolius), hairy rock-cress (Arabis hirsuta) and man orchid (Aceras anthropophorum).

The site's butterfly fauna is mentioned in its citation sheet. Twenty-five species are known to breed, including colonies of silver-spotted skipper and Duke of Burgundy, together with comparatively large populations of brown argus, green hairstreak, chalkhill blue, marbled white and dingy skipper.

== Geology ==
=== Structure ===
The structural picture is similar to that at Winchester 15 kilometres (9.3 mi) to the west, with an east–west trending anticline in the upper chalk (the Winchester-East Meon Anticline) cut through by a south-flowing river to expose an inlier of middle and lower chalk. As with the Itchen, the upper Meon flows westwards along the fold trend, before swinging south to cut through the anticline. Beacon Hill at 201 metres (659 ft) to the west of the Meon and Old Winchester Hill at 212 metres (696 ft) to the east are remnants of the southward-dipping chalk on the southern side of the anticline. The anticline is somewhat domed, with the result that Old Winchester Hill is capped by older chalk than Beacon Hill despite being rather higher, whilst Wether Down and Butser Hill to the east are higher still.

=== Geomorphology ===
Beacon Hill is a section of east-facing Upper Chalk escarpment. Both Beacon Hill and Old Winchester Hill have a claim to being the point at which the main north-facing scarp of the South Downs turns northwards around the western end of the Weald; Beacon Hill is lower, but represents a higher level within the chalk, and Old Winchester Hill is cut to the north by the upper Meon valley. Small suggests that the upper Meon (which like the upper Itchen flows east–west) was originally a headwater of the Itchen following the col to the north of Beacon Hill, before the south-flowing lower Meon cut back through the chalk.

The hill has been incised by a series of steep-sided semi-circular combes to the east, and deep dry valleys to the south and west. Between these several radiating spurs with minor roads and tracks meet near the summit.

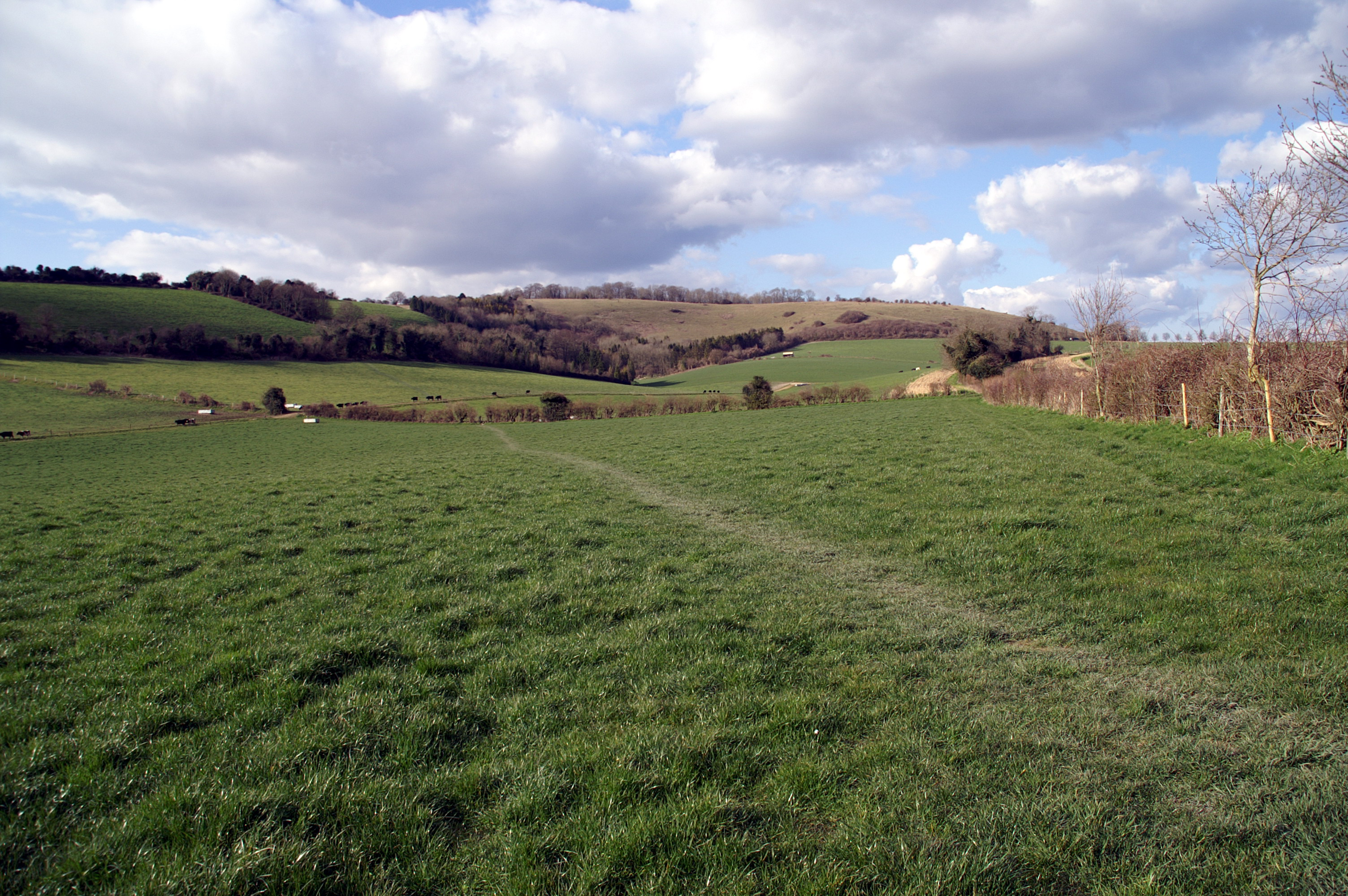
The south eastern combe from the South Downs Way above Exton.

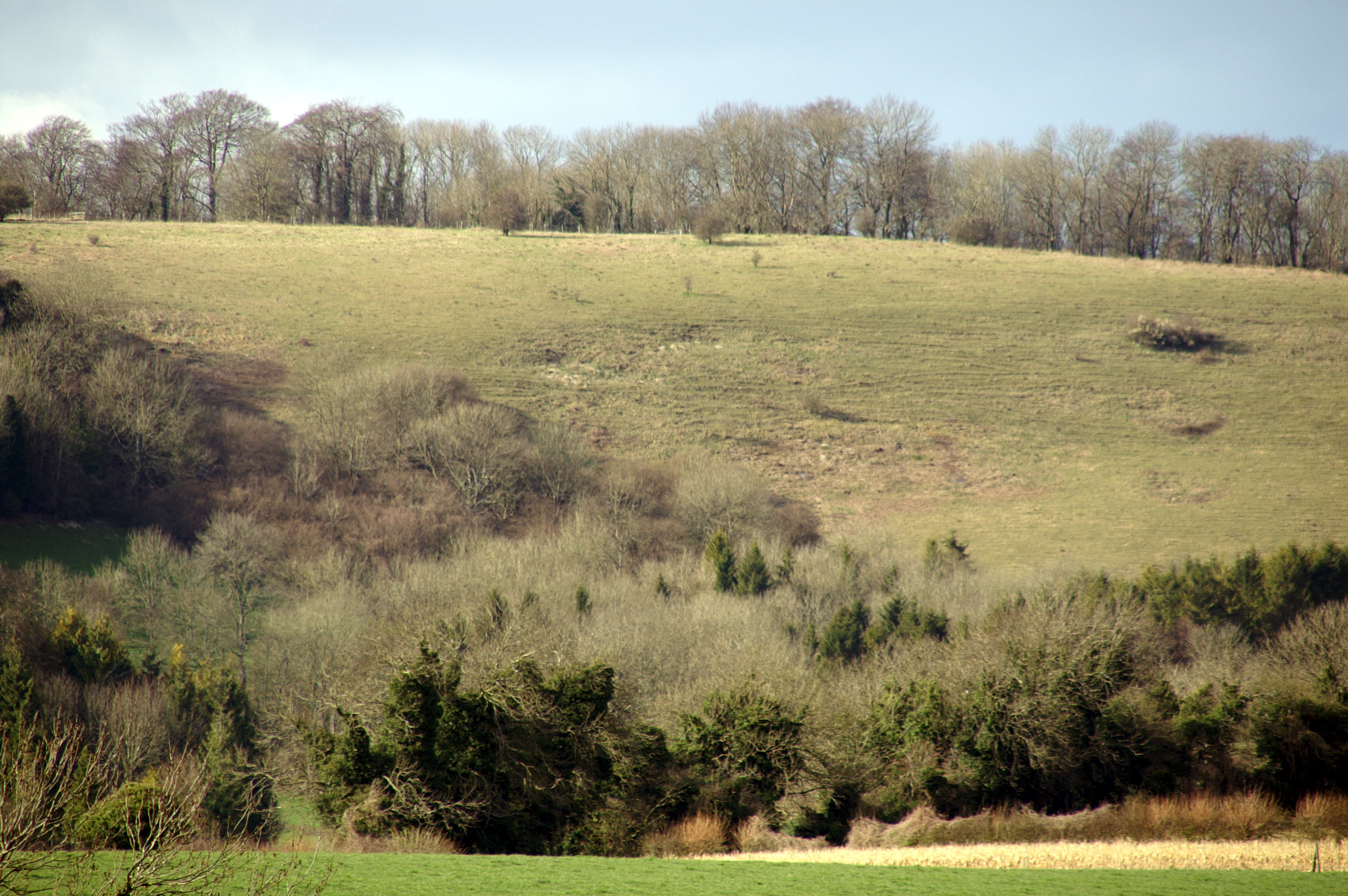
The back of the south eastern combe.

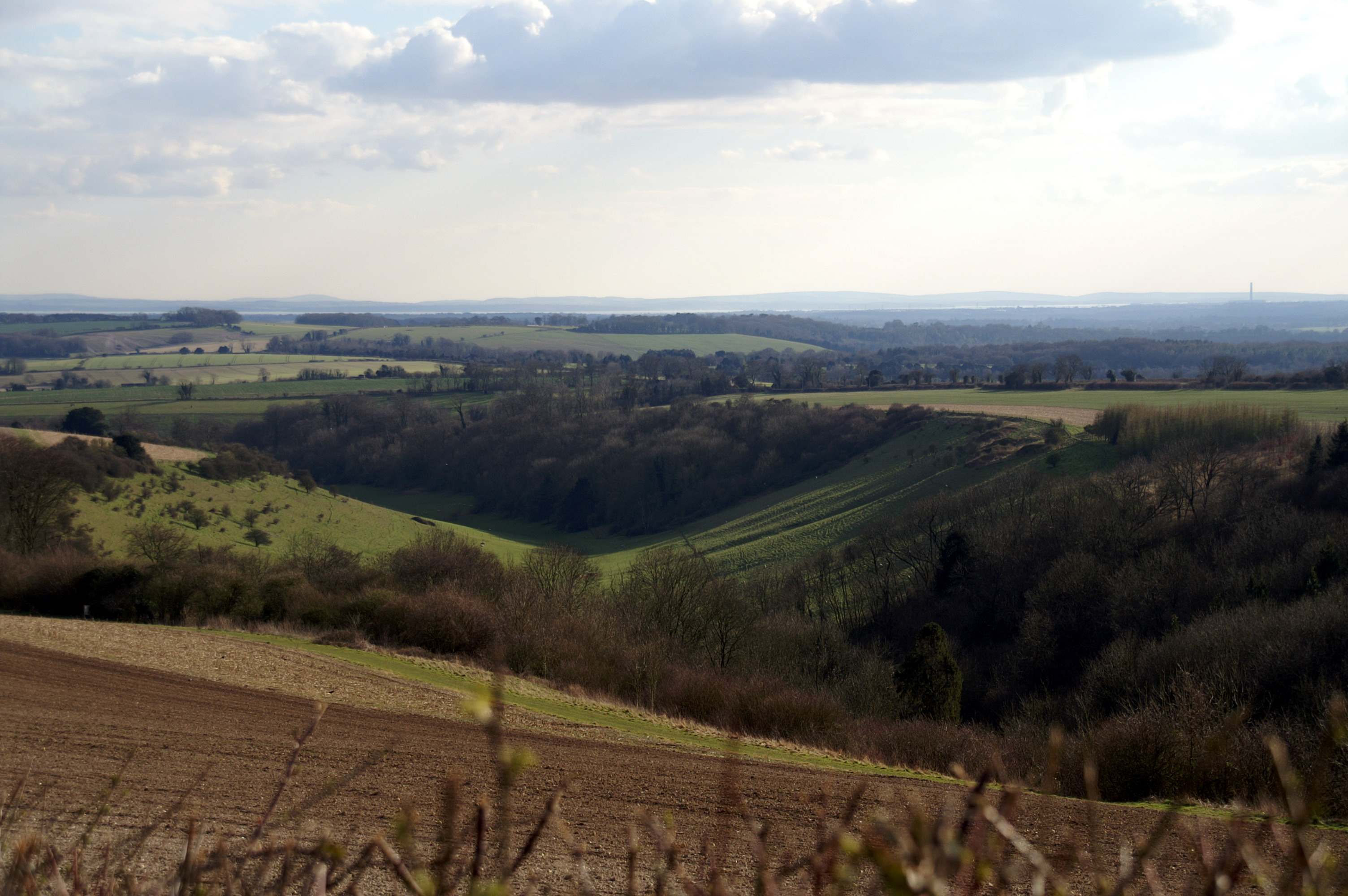
The Punchbowl, on the southern side, with view to Isle of Wight.

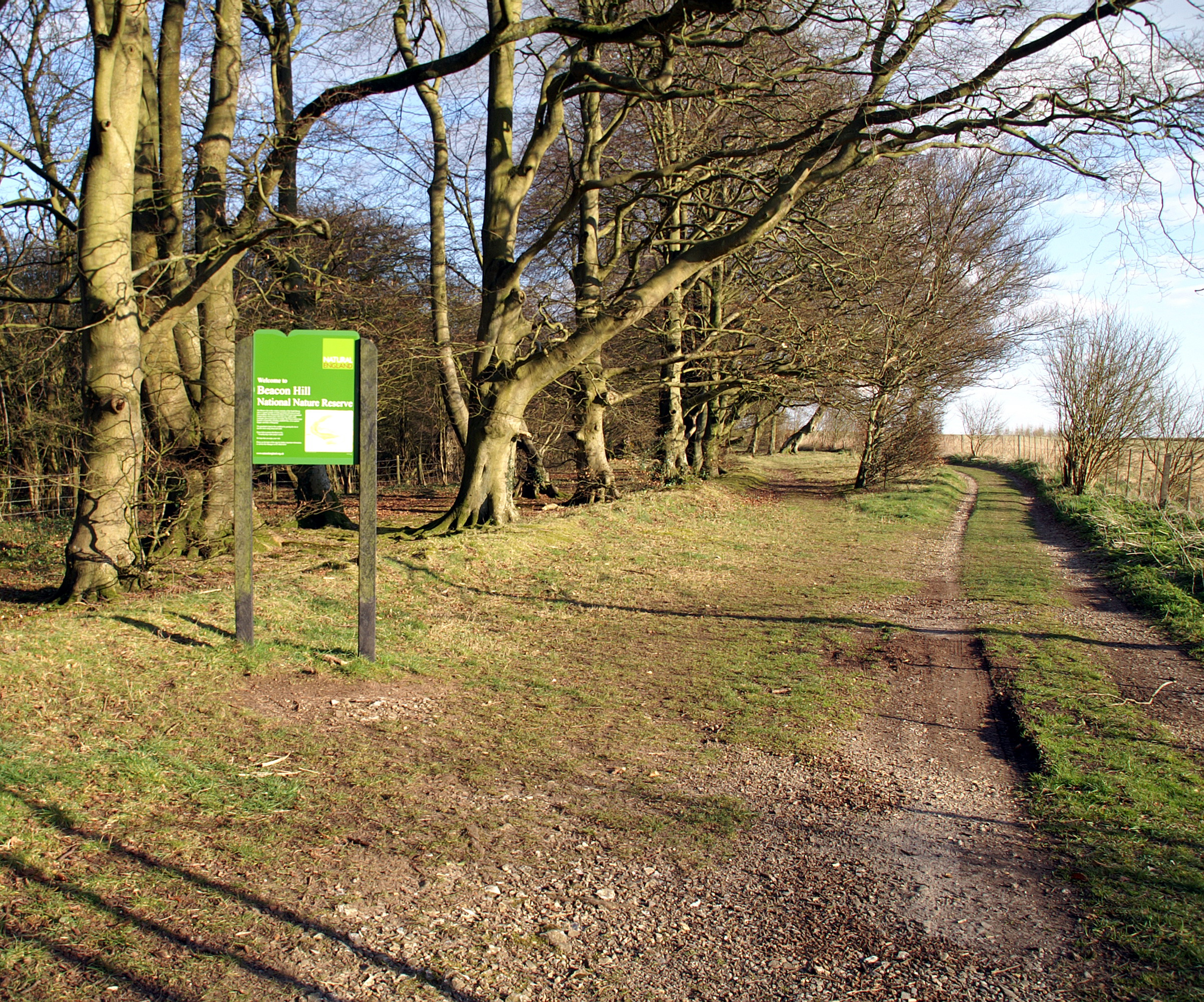
Beaconhill Beeches, part of the SSSI and NNR.

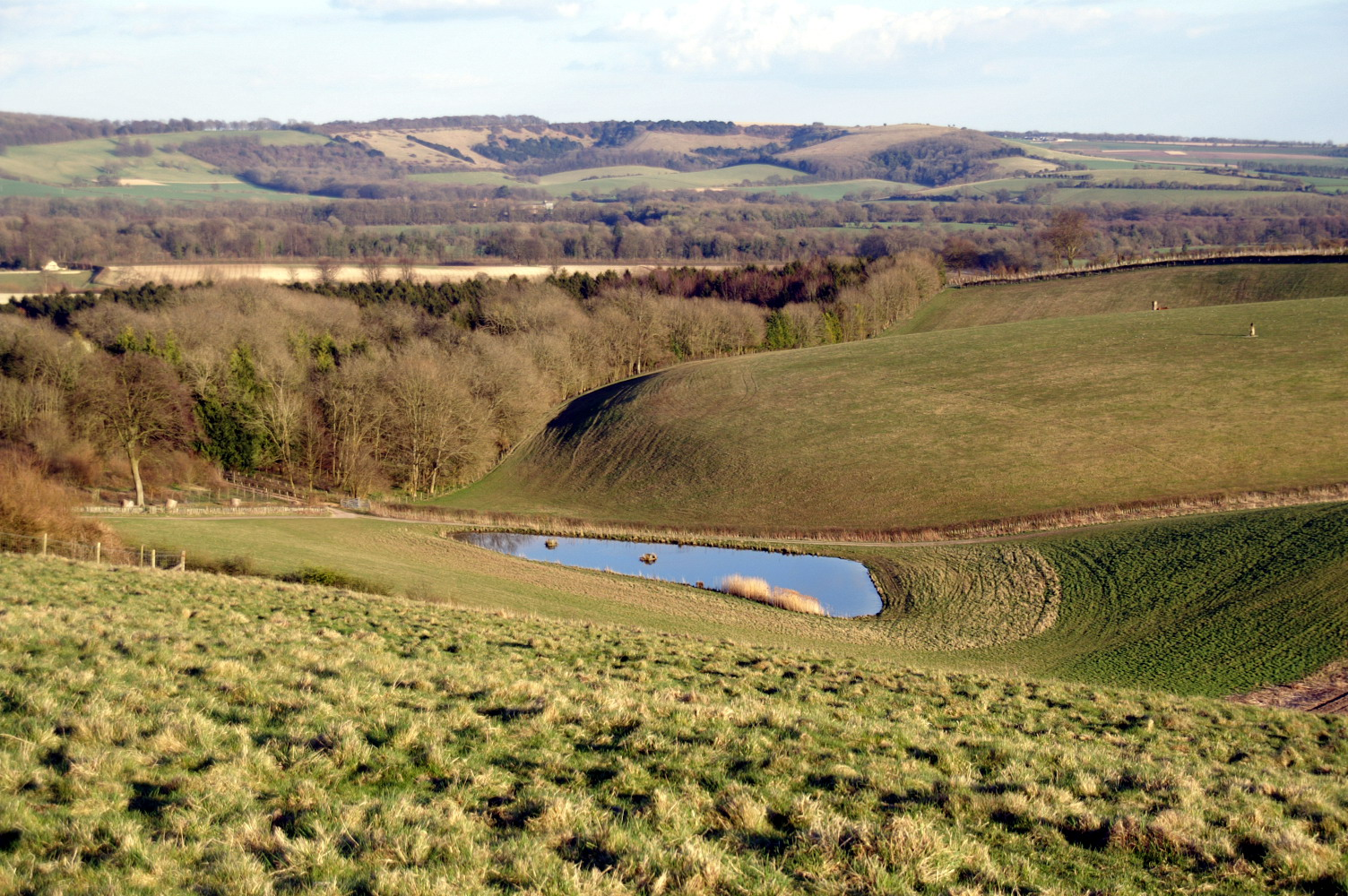
A combe on the eastern side, looking across the Meon Valley to Old Winchester Hill.
