= Dean Hill Anticline =

Geologic feature in southern England

The Dean Hill Anticline is an east–west trending fold in the Cretaceous chalk of Hampshire, England. It lies immediately to the north of the Hampshire Basin and south of Salisbury Plain.

== Structure ==
The anticline runs west 15 kilometres (9.3 mi) from the River Test near Lockerley along the northern rim of the Hampshire Basin, to the south of a narrow strip of palaeogene rocks, the Alderbury-Mottisfont Syncline. At the eastern end under the Test Valley it is cut by the northward-swinging Portsdown Anticline. At the western end to the south-east of Salisbury the structure is cut by the Mere Fault.

In the core the Santonian Newhaven Chalk Formation reaches the surface. In the outer limits near Whiteparish chalk as young as the Campanian Portsdown Chalk Formation is found.

Hills include Witherington Down, Pepperbox Hill and Dean Hill.

== See also ==
List of geological folds in Great Britain
