= Micheldever Syncline =

Geological feature in Hampshire

The Micheldever Syncline is one of a series of parallel east-west trending folds in the Cretaceous chalk of Hampshire. It lies at the western end of the South Downs, immediately to the north of the Stockbridge Anticline and east of Salisbury Plain.

== Structure ==
The fold axis runs for around 40 kilometres (25 mi) from north-west of Andover in the west, through Barton Stacey, Micheldever and East Stratton, towards Preston Candover in the east. The central area of the fold axis is followed by the valley of the River Dever, which turns south-west at Bransbury to cut across the structure and the Stockbridge Anticline to the south.

Parallel folds to the south include the Stockbridge Anticline and the Winchester-King's Somborne Syncline. As with other nearby folds, the structure is controlled by movement of fault blocks within the Jurassic strata below.

== See also ==
- List of geological folds in Great Britain
