= Old Winchester Hill =

Hillfort in Hampshire, England

Coordinates: 50.98102°N 1.08814°W

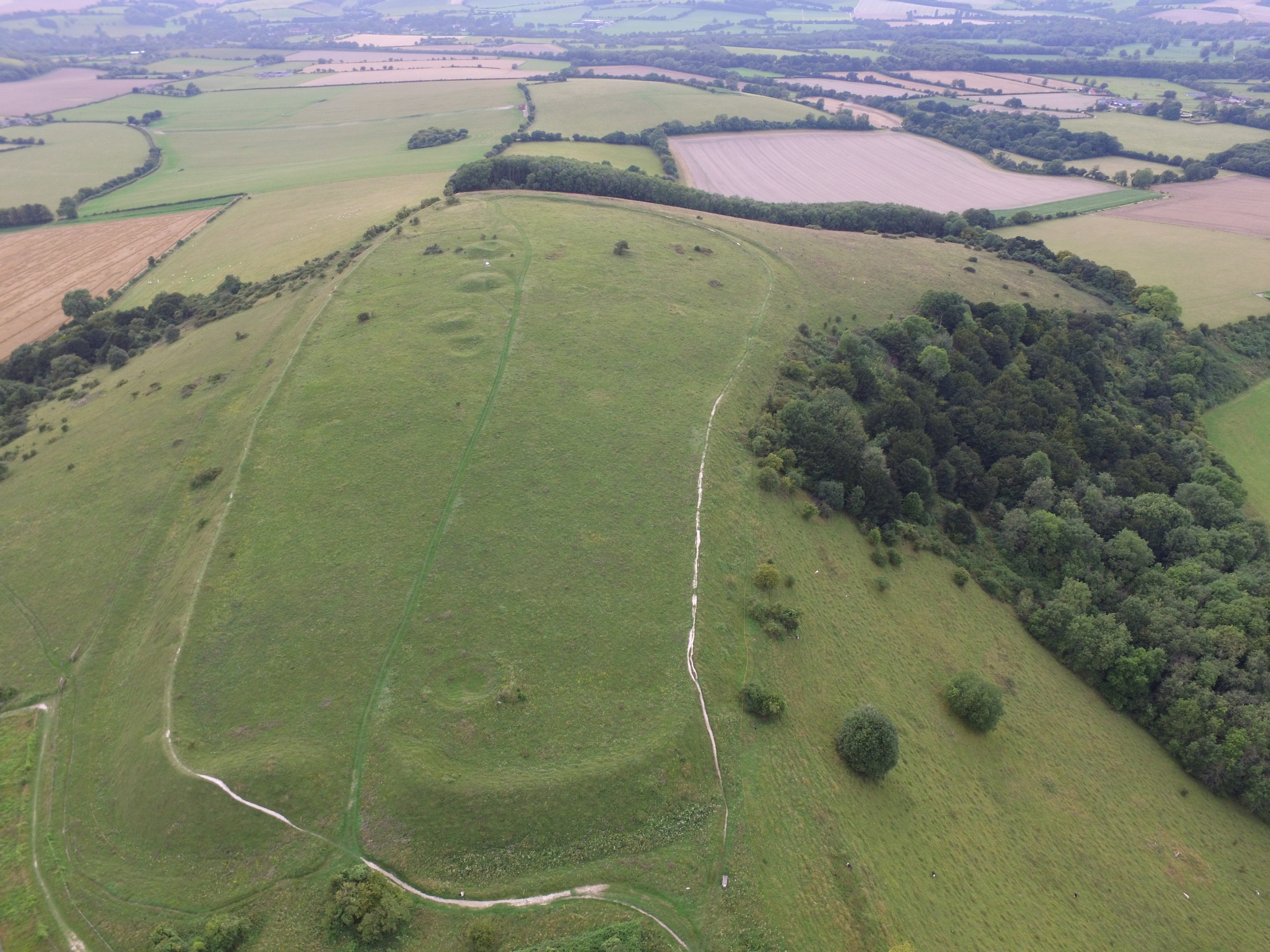
- Iron Age hillfort viewed from the east
- Interactive map of Old Winchester Hill

History
- Abandoned: Iron age

Site notes
- Elevation: 130 m (430 ft)
- Area: Hampshire
- Excavation dates: Partly Excavated
- Management: Natural England

Old Winchester Hill
- Site of Special Scientific Interest
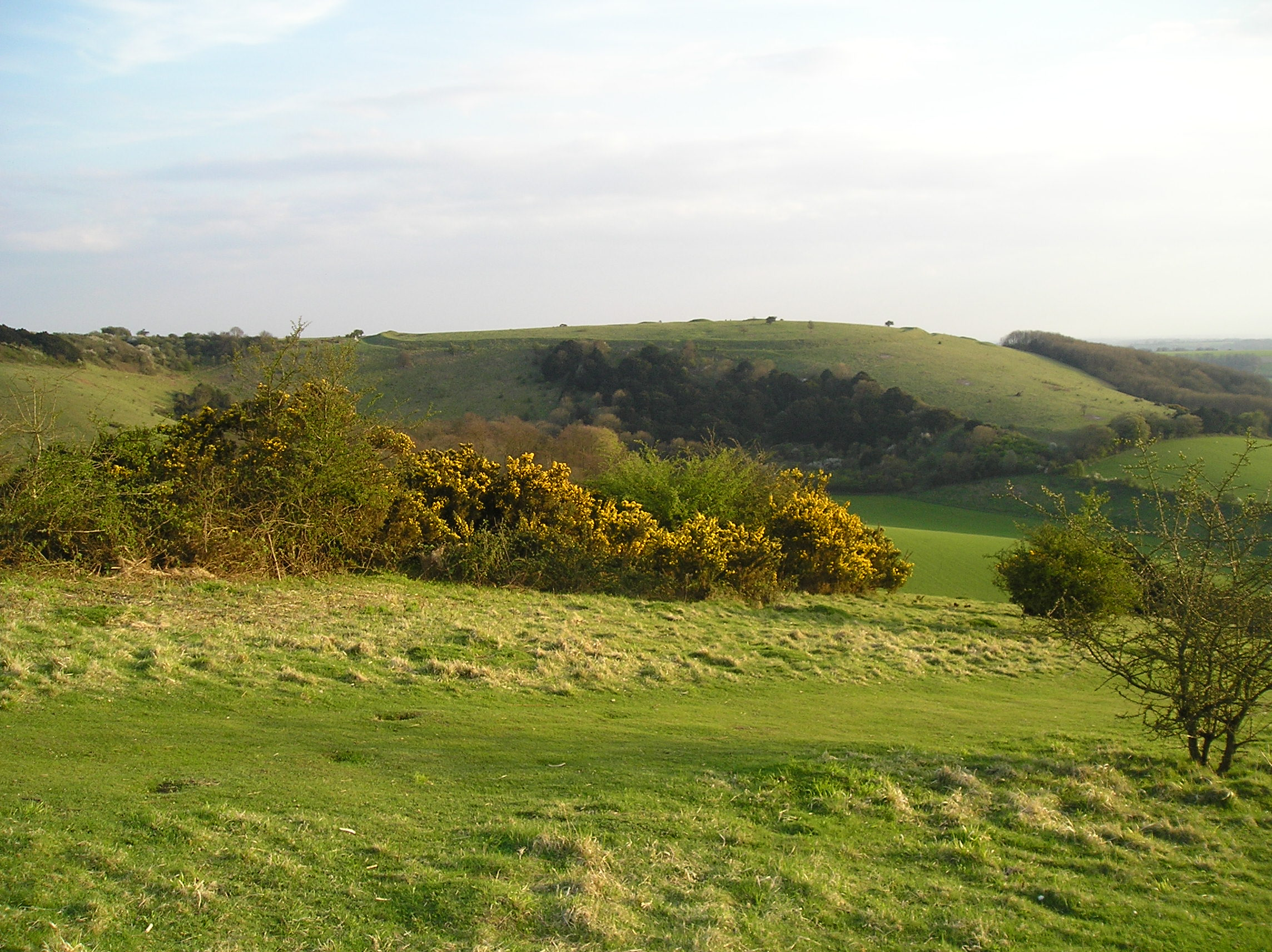
- Location of Old Winchester Hill.
- Area of search: Hampshire
- Grid reference: SU 642 208
- Interest: Biological
- Area: 66.2 hectares (164 acres)
- Notification date: 1986

Old Winchester Hill is a 66.2-hectare (164-acre) biological Site of Special Scientific Interest in Hampshire. It is a Nature Conservation Review site, Grade I, and a national nature reserve. Part of it is a scheduled monument.

== Location ==
Despite its name, the hill is around 11 miles (18 km) from Winchester; it is, however, part of the Winchester–East Meon Anticline. It lies east of Corhampton on the eastern side of the Meon Valley, opposite Beacon Hill. The South Downs Way and Monarch's Way long-distance footpaths cross the summit of the hill, which reaches 197 metres (646 ft). About 1.2 miles (2 km) northeast is another prominent hill, Henwood Down (201 metres/659 ft), above the village of East Meon.

In March 2009, it became part of the South Downs National Park.

== Archaeology ==
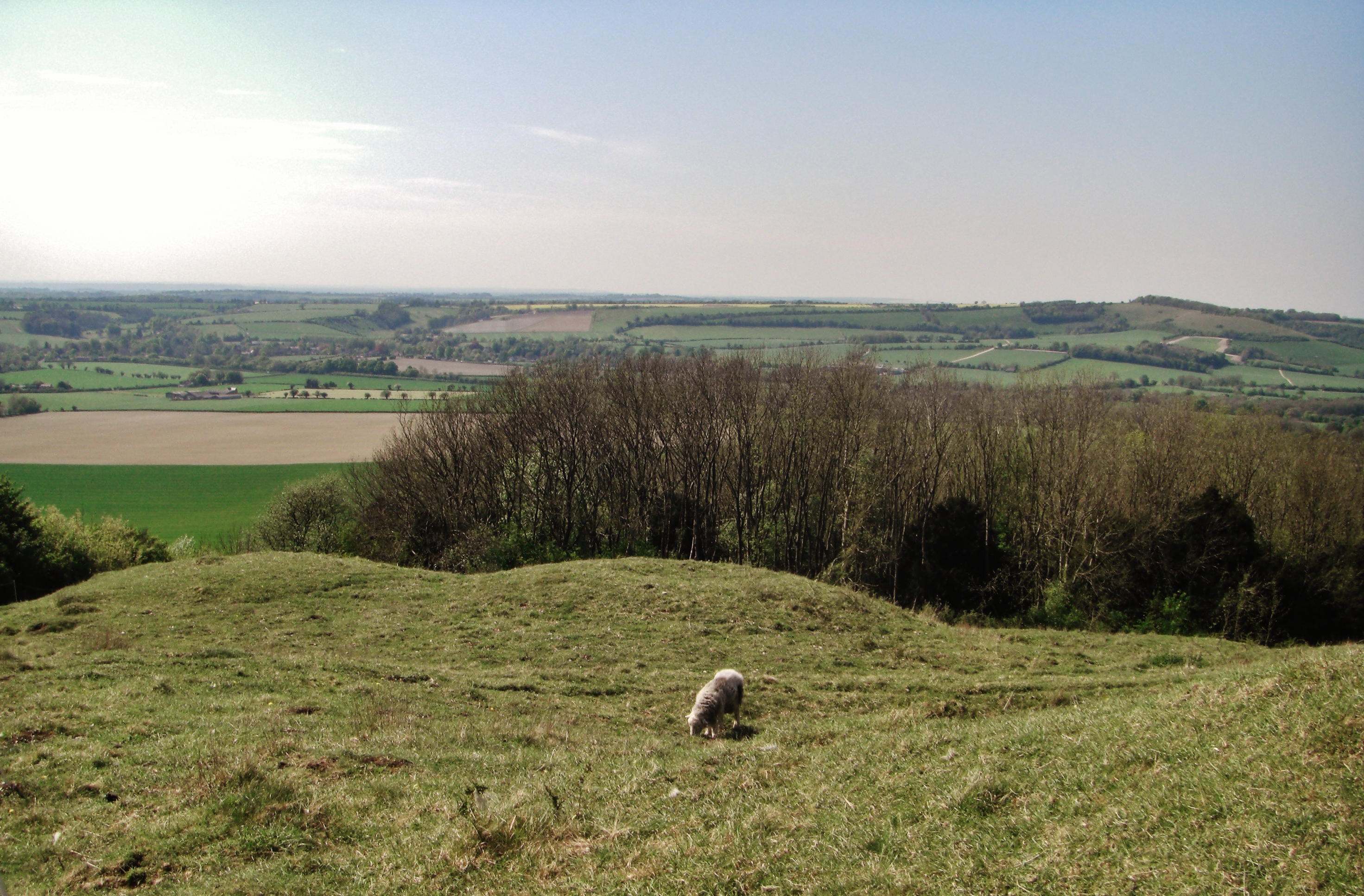
Three of the barrows situated outside of the western entrance to the hillfort.

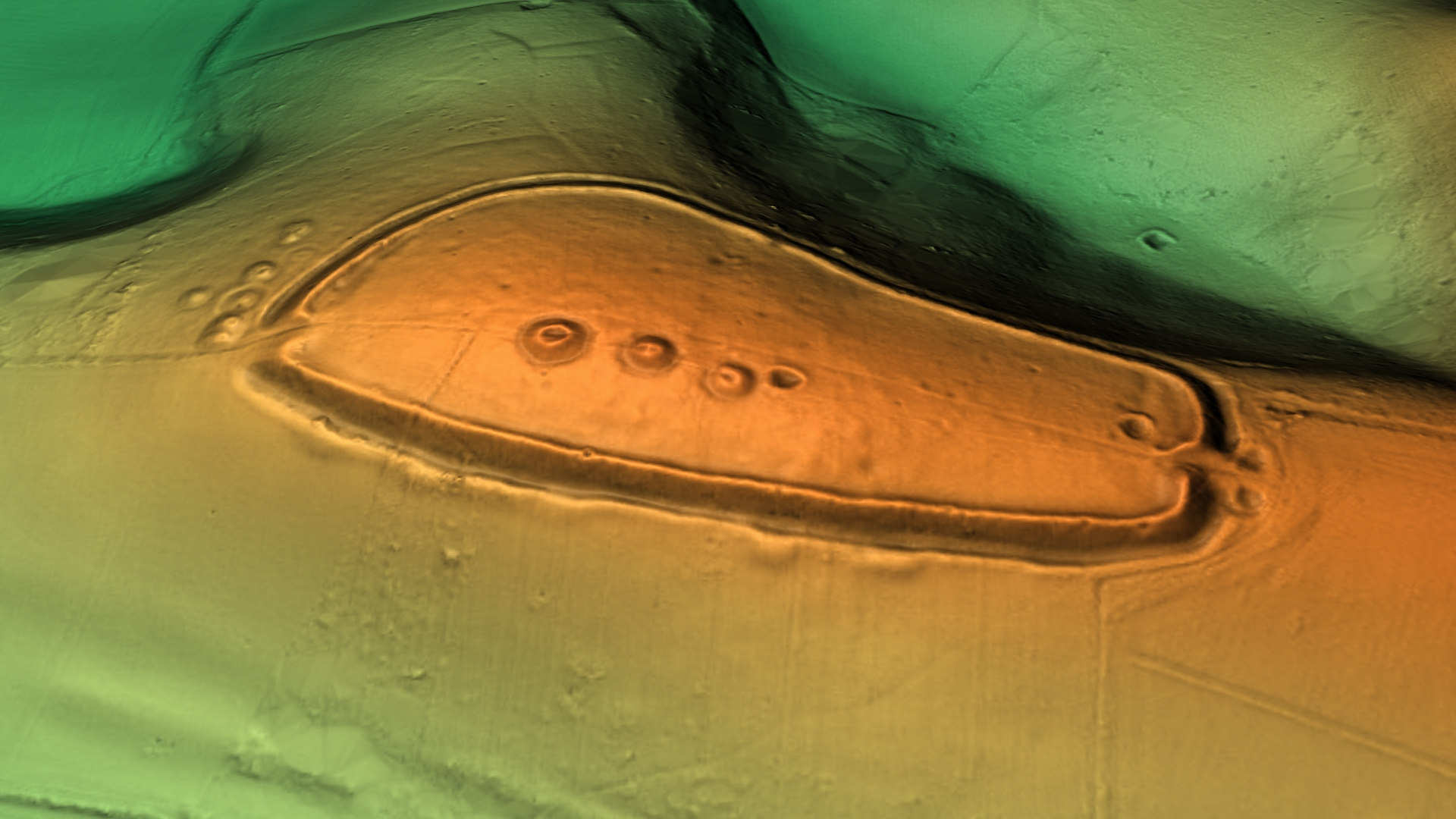
3D view of the digital terrain model

On the summit of the hill is an Iron Age hill fort. Within the hill fort can also be found Bronze Age barrows dating between 2100 and 750 BCE. The fort itself was probably built in the Early or early–Middle Iron Age (600–300 BCE) and fell out of use around the beginning of the Late Iron Age (150–100 BCE), as this is the general pattern for hill forts in the south-east of England. More modern archaeology dates from World War II when the British Army used the hill as a mortar testing range. Some unexploded ordnance may still remain in 'fenced-off' sections of the hill; however, grazing hill-sheep access all areas so danger to the casual walker is likely to be low.

== Wildlife ==
The hill is a Site of Special Scientific Interest and a national nature reserve managed by Natural England. This unimproved chalk downland is home to a number of butterfly species, including the Adonis blue, chalkhill blue, common blue, dark green fritillary, Essex skipper, marbled white, meadow brown, silver-spotted skipper, small heath, small skipper, and speckled wood. There is also a diverse bird population, including the European green woodpecker, commonly seen feeding amongst the many anthills (which are also very important for the lifecycle of the Lycaenidae butterflies) and the turtle dove. Many species of orchid can be found on the hill or in the immediate vicinity including the fly, bee and frog orchids. Many mammals can be found here including badgers, foxes, roe deer and muntjac deer. Smaller mammals include hares, stoats and weasels.
