= List of hills of Hampshire =

This is a list of hills in Hampshire. It is based on the online Database of British and Irish Hills, Jackson's More Relative Hills of Britain and list of 30 metre prominences and the Ordnance Survey mapping service.

Many of these hills are important historic, archaeological and nature conservation sites, as well as popular hiking and tourist destinations in the county of Hampshire in southern England.

== Colour key ==
Class	Prominence
Marilyns	150–599 m
HuMPs	100–149 m
TuMPs	30–99 m
Unclassified	0–29 m

The table is colour-coded based on the classification or "listing" of the hill. The types that occur in Hampshire are Marilyns, HuMPs and TuMPs, listings that are based on the topographical prominence. "Prominence" correlates strongly with the subjective significance of a summit. Peaks with low prominences are either subsidiary tops of a higher summit or relatively insignificant independent summits. Peaks with high prominences tend to be the highest points around and likely to have extraordinary views.

A Marilyn is a hill of any height that has a prominence of at least 150 metres or about 500 feet. A "HuMP" (the acronym comes from "Hundred Metre Prominence) is a hill with a prominence of at least 100 but less than 150 metres. In this table Marilyns are in beige and HuMPs in lilac. The term "sub-Marilyn" or "sub-HuMP" is used, e.g. in the Database of British and Irish Hills to indicate hills that fall just below the threshold.

To qualify for inclusion, hills must either be 200 metres or higher with a prominence of at least 30 metres, below 200 metres with a prominence of at least 90 metres (the threshold for a sub-HuMP), or be in some other way notable. For further information see the Lists of mountains and hills in the British Isles and the individual articles on Marilyns, HuMPs and TuMPs.

In this context, "TuMP" is used to connote a hill with a prominence of at least 30 but less than 100 metres. By way of contrast, see also the article listing Tumps (a traditional term meaning a hillock, mound, barrow or tumulus).

The county tops (i.e. highest points) of Portsmouth and Southampton unitary authorities are not strictly in the modern county of Hampshire, but are included because they fall within Hampshire's historic county boundary.

== Table ==
Hill	Height (m)	Prom. (m)	Grid ref.	Class	Parent	Range/Region	Remarks	Image
Pilot Hill	286	45	SU398601	County top, TuMP	Walbury Hill	Hampshire Downs	Hampshire's county top. West flank in the county of Berkshire.	
Butser Hill	270	158	ST437012	Marilyn, HuMP, TuMP	Walbury Hill	South Downs	Hampshire's only Marilyn. Highest point on the South Downs. Iron Age earthworks, SSSI, NNR.	
Sidown Hill	266	34	SU444573	TuMP	Walbury Hill	Hampshire Downs	Grade II listed building, Heaven's Gate, on summit.	
Beacon Hill	261	73	SU458572	TuMP	Walbury Hill	Hampshire Downs	Near Burghclere. Formerly site of most famous beacon in Hampshire. Hill fort, SSSI, NNR.	
Wheatham Hill	249	125	SU731277	HuMP	Butser Hill	Hampshire Downs, East Hampshire Hangers		
War Down	244	90	SU726198 (est.)	sub-HuMP, TuMP	Butser Hill	South Downs		
Watership Down	237	90	SU495568	sub-HuMP, TuMP	Walbury Hill	Hampshire Downs	Setting for Richard Adams' novel.	
Wether Down	234	37	SU675197	TuMP	Butser Hill	South Downs		
Ladle Hill	232	41	SU478568	TuMP	Walbury Hill	Hampshire Downs	Unique example of an unfinished hill fort.	
Holybourne Hill	225	64	SU725437	TuMP	Butser Hill	Hampshire Downs	Near the village of Holybourne Also known as Holybourne Down	
Red Hill	221	48	SU672359	TuMP	Butser Hill	Hampshire Downs		
Goleigh Hill	220	53	SU726308	TuMP	Butser Hill	Hampshire Downs; East Hampshire Hangers	Near Empshott and Noar Hill	
King's Hill	218	46	SU672375	TuMP	Butser Hill	Hampshire Downs	On the road between Medstead and Beech	
Noar Hill	214	59	SU747318	Tump	Butser Hill	Hampshire Downs, East Hampshire Hangers	Near Empshott and Goleigh Hill	
Pidham Hill	213	57	SU694229	TuMP	Butser Hill	South Downs		
Selborne Hill	211	53	SU736331	TuMP	Butser Hill	Hampshire Downs, East Hampshire Hangers	Selborne Common occupies the crown of the hill.	
Farleigh Hill	208	34	SU616472	TuMP	Butser Hill	Hampshire Downs		
Head Down	205	68	SU735191	TuMP	Butser Hill	South Downs	1 km S of Buriton	
Oakham Hill	202	65	SU749188	TuMP	Butser Hill	South Downs		
Beacon Hill	201	88	SU602224	TuMP	Butser Hill	South Downs		
Henwood Down	201	64	SU661219	TuMP	Butser Hill	South Downs		
Old Winchester Hill	197		SU643205			South Downs	Iron Age hill fort, Bronze Age cemetery. SSSI, NNR. On spur of unnamed hill that is over 210 m high and not listed.	
Windmill Hill	194	84	SU716160	TuMP	Butser Hill	South Downs	Grade II listed windmill at summit.	
Farley Mount	178	83	SU403290	TuMP	Butser Hill	Hampshire Downs	Folly near summit.	
Broadhalfpenny Down	158	43	SU672160	TuMP	Butser Hill	South Downs	Historic cricket venue.	
Fort Southwick Portsdown	122	84	SU626069	TuMP	Butser Hill	South Hampshire Lowlands	Portsmouth's county top.	
King John's Hill	115	21	SU755377	TuMP		Hampshire Downs	Iron Age hillfort and medieval hunting lodge	
St. Catherine's Hill	97	35	SU484276	TuMP	Butser Hill	Hampshire Downs	SSSI, Iron Age hill fort.	
Bassett Avenue	82	5	SU419169	None		South Hampshire Lowlands	Southampton's county top. Bassett district of Southampton	

The following summits have been omitted from the table as they are considered sub-peaks, alternative names of hills in the main list or are otherwise not eligible at this stage:

- Cottington's Hill or King John's Hill, Kingsclere, Hampshire Downs (230 metres (750 ft))
- Stoner Hill, Hampshire Downs, East Hampshire Hangers (233 metres (764 ft)) is a subsidiary summit of Wheatham Hill (249 metres (817 ft)).

== See also ==
- List of mountains and hills of the United Kingdom
- List of Marilyns in England
- Geology of Hampshire
