= Pidham Hill =

Hill in Hampshire, England

Highest point
- Elevation: 699 feet (213 m)
- Prominence: 187 feet (57 m)
- Parent peak: Butser Hill
- Listing: Tump
- Coordinates: 51°00′05″N 1°00′44″W

Geography
- Location: Hampshire, England
- Parent range: Hampshire Downs
- OS grid: SU694229
- Topo map: OS Landranger

Climbing
- Easiest route: Walk

Pidham Hill is a hill in the county of Hampshire, England. The summit elevation is 699 feet (213 m) AMSL. Pidham Hill is about 2 kilometres east-northeast of the village of East Meon in Hampshire, north of the road to Langrish. It is part of the East Hampshire Hangers of the Hampshire Downs and is located near to where the Hangers merge with the South Downs.
