= Empshott =

Village and parish in Hampshire, England

Coordinates: 51.076°N 0.927°W

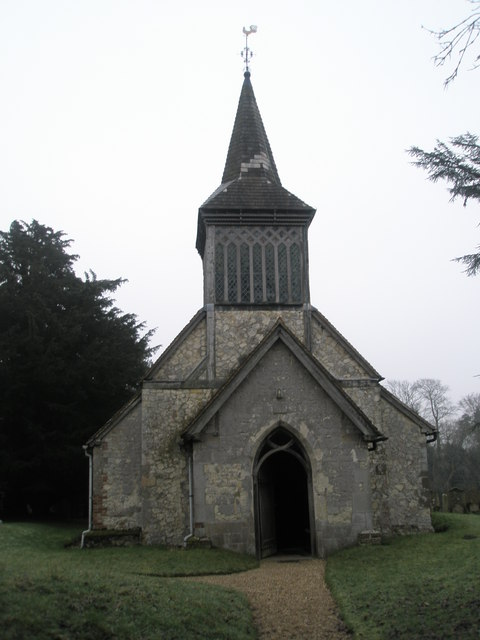
- Holy Rood, Empshott

- Location within Hampshire
- OS grid reference: SU752312
- Civil parish: Hawkley
- District: East Hampshire
- Shire county: Hampshire
- Region: South East
- Country: England
- Sovereign state: United Kingdom
- Post town: Liss
- Postcode district: GU33
- Police: Hampshire and Isle of Wight
- Fire: Hampshire and Isle of Wight
- Ambulance: South Central
- UK Parliament: East Hampshire

Empshott is a village and former civil parish, now in the parish of Hawkley, in the East Hampshire district of Hampshire, England. It lies 3.5 miles (5.5 km) southwest of Bordon, its nearest town. The nearest railway station is 2.7 miles (4.4 km) southeast of the village, at Liss. In 1931 the parish had a population of 171.

== Geography ==
To the west the land rises steeply in a scarp formation known as the East Hampshire Hangars. Goleigh Hill (220 m) and Noar Hill (214 m) are two of the highest points in the county which forms parts of the Hampshire Downs. The River Rother has its source in the village.

== History ==
Empshott is listed in the 1086 Domesday survey as being held by Geoffrey the Marshal, having been granted the land from pre-conquest landowners Bondi the Constable and Saxi of Clatford after 1066. The hamlet comprised four villagers and a mill.

The famous Hambledon batsman John Small was born in Empshott in 1737.

On 1 April 1932 the parish was abolished and merged with Hawkley.

== Church ==
The village is home to the Holy Rood church which dates to the 13th century. Later additions include a Victorian bell-turret.
