= Cliddesden =

Village and parish in Hampshire, England

Coordinates: 51.236830°N 1.093964°W

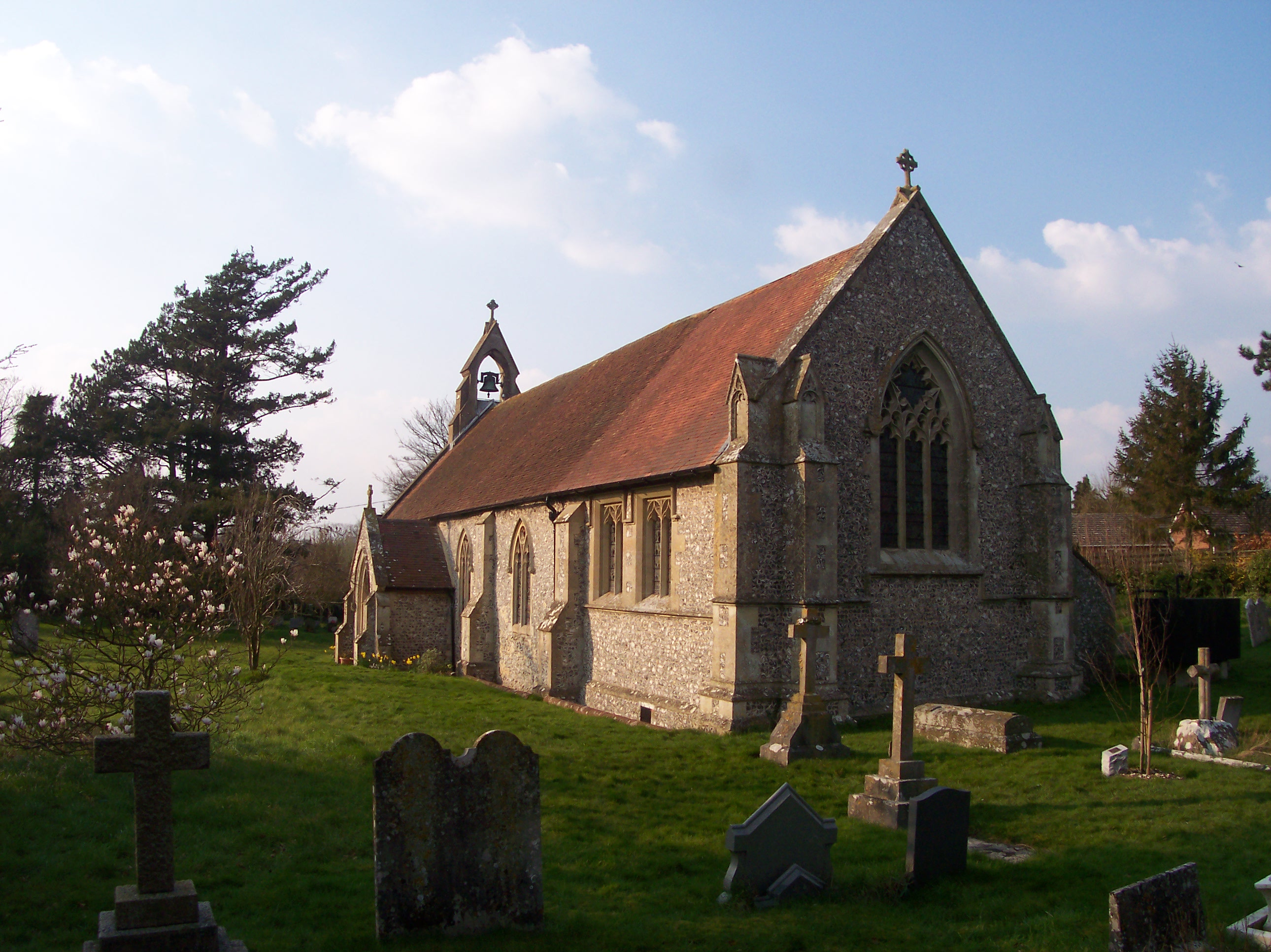
- Church of St Leonard

- Location within Hampshire
- Population: 497 (2011 Census)
- OS grid reference: SU6335049017
- District: Basingstoke and Deane
- Shire county: Hampshire
- Region: South East
- Country: England
- Sovereign state: United Kingdom
- Post town: BASINGSTOKE
- Postcode district: RG25
- Dialling code: 01256
- Police: Hampshire and Isle of Wight
- Fire: Hampshire and Isle of Wight
- Ambulance: South Central
- UK Parliament: Basingstoke

Cliddesden is a village and a parish in Hampshire, England located 3 miles south of Basingstoke, close to the M3 motorway. In the 2001 census it had a population of 489, increasing to 497 at the 2011 Census. The land and housing are currently protected as it is within a Conservation Zone and has many areas of beauty and rolling countryside.

The village was formerly served by Cliddesden railway station on the now defunct Basingstoke and Alton Light Railway. The station was used in the making of several films. In the 1937 film Oh, Mr Porter!, Cliddesden appeared as 'Buggleskelly'. A short length of railway track was installed in the centre of the Viables Roundabout in Basingstoke in 1976 to commemorate the line at a point close to its original route. The B3046 runs through the village centre.

About 1.5 miles (2.4 km) to the southwest lies one of the highest points on the Hampshire Downs, Farleigh Hill (208 m).

== Location ==
Position: grid reference SU631489

Nearby towns and cities: Alton, Andover, Basingstoke, Newbury, Winchester

Nearby villages: Axford, Dummer, Ellisfield, Farleigh Wallop, Herriard, Hook, Kingsclere, North Waltham, Oakley, Old Basing, Overton, Steventon, Whitchurch.
