= Goleigh Hill =

Hill in Hampshire, England

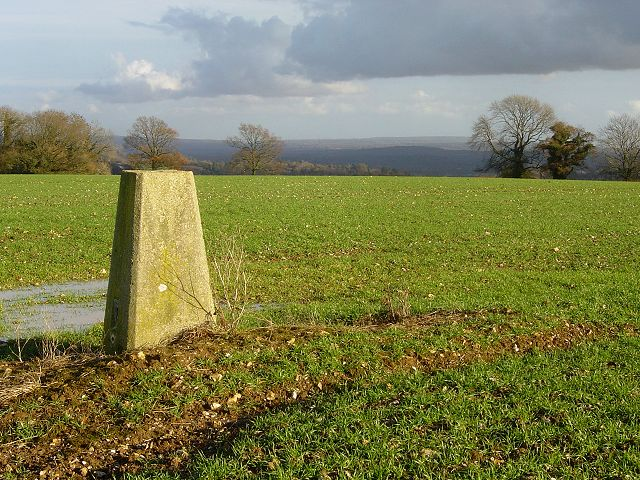
- Trig point on the hill above Goleigh Farm

Highest point
- Elevation: 220 m (720 ft)
- Prominence: 53 m (174 ft)
- Parent peak: Butser Hill
- Coordinates: 51°04′20″N 0°57′50″W

Geography
- Location: Hampshire, England
- Parent range: Hampshire Downs
- OS grid: SU726308
- Topo map: OS Landranger

Goleigh Hill is one of the highest points in the county of Hampshire, England. It is part of the Hampshire Downs and reaches a height of 220 metres (720 ft) above sea level.

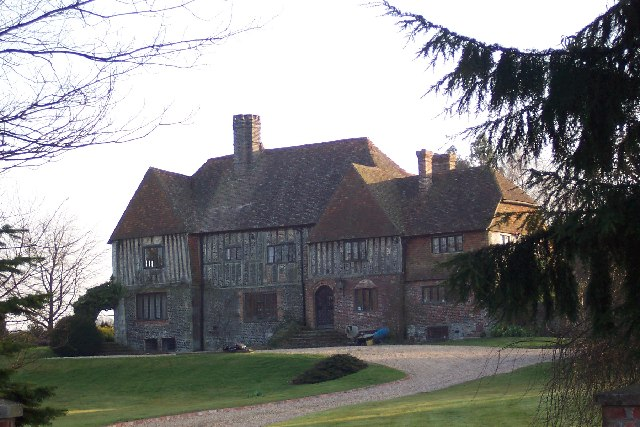
Goleigh Manor

Goleigh Hill rises about 2.5 kilometres west of the village of Empshott in Hampshire and is one of the East Hampshire Hangers. The top of the hill is open. Wooded areas on its flanks included Goleigh and Lye Woods to the west and Abbot's Copse to the east. Goleigh Farm lies on the northwestern slope of the hill with Goleigh Manor in the valley below it. There is a trig point at the summit.
