= Noar Hill =

Protected area in Hampshire, England

Coordinates: 51.080°N 0.941°W

- Site of Special Scientific Interest
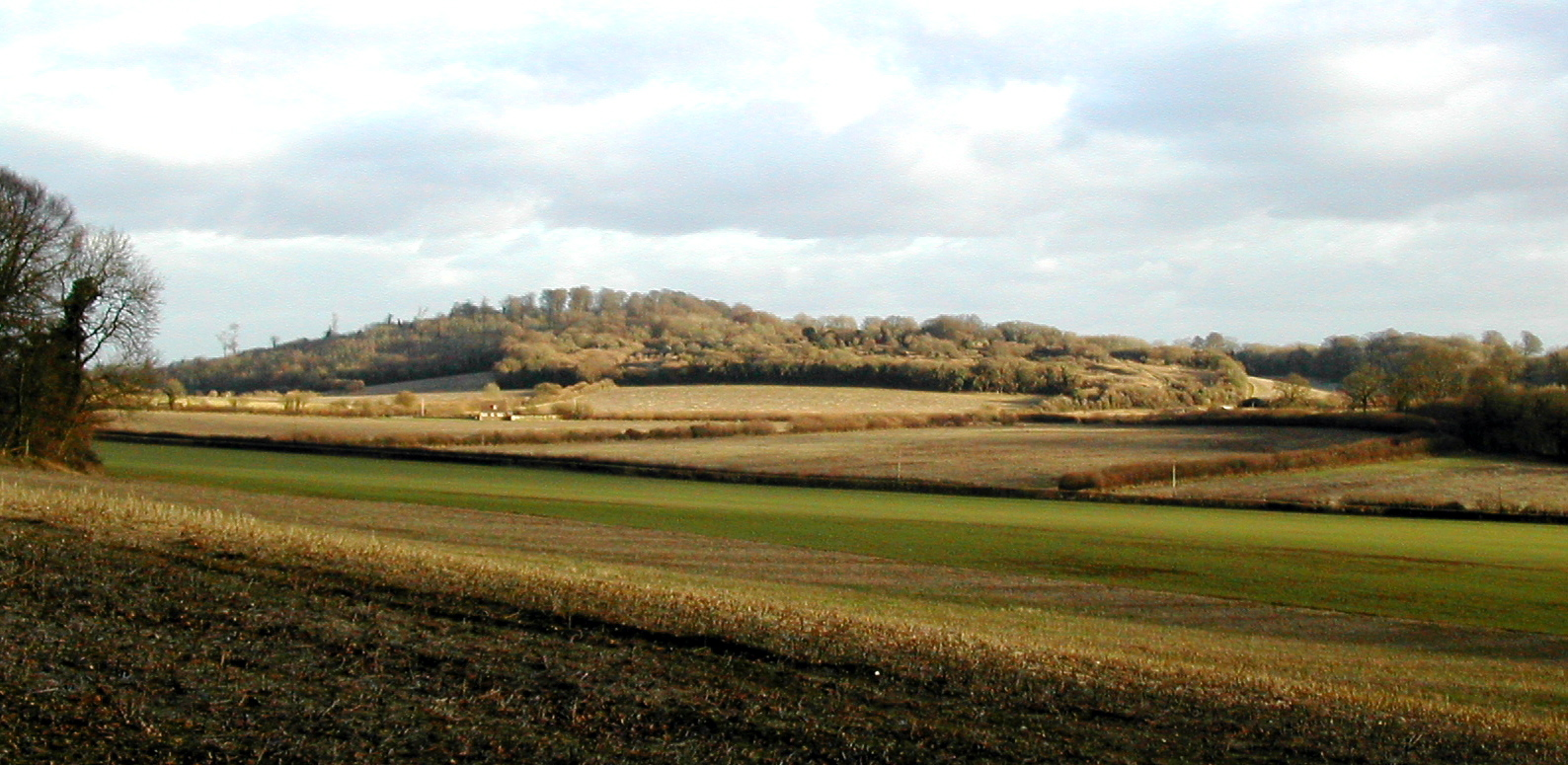
- Location of Noar Hill.
- Area of search: Hampshire
- Grid reference: SU 743 317
- Interest: Biological
- Area: 63.0 hectares (156 acres)
- Notification date: 1984
- Location map: Magic Map

Noar Hill is a 63-hectare (160-acre) biological Site of Special Scientific Interest south of Selborne in Hampshire. It is a Nature Conservation Review site, Grade 2, and part of East Hampshire Hangers Special Area of Conservation. An area of 20 hectares (49 acres) is a nature reserve managed by the Hampshire and Isle of Wight Wildlife Trust.

Noar Hill summit is approximately 214 metres above sea-level. It is one the East Hampshire Hangers, a chain of low but steep hills in the Hampshire Downs, west of the South Downs. The western and northern slopes are gentle, but the eastern and southern slopes have gradients exceeding 60%.

Gilbert White, in his Natural History of Selborne, says of Noar Hill:

At each end of the village [Selborne], which runs from south-east to north-west, arises a small rivulet: that at the north-west end frequently fails: but the other is a fine perennial spring little influenced by drought or wet seasons, called Well-head. This breaks out of some high grounds adjoining to Nore Hill, a noble chalk promontory, remarkable for sending forth two streams into two different seas. The one to the south becomes a branch of the Arun, running to Arundel, and so falling into the British channel: the other to the north.

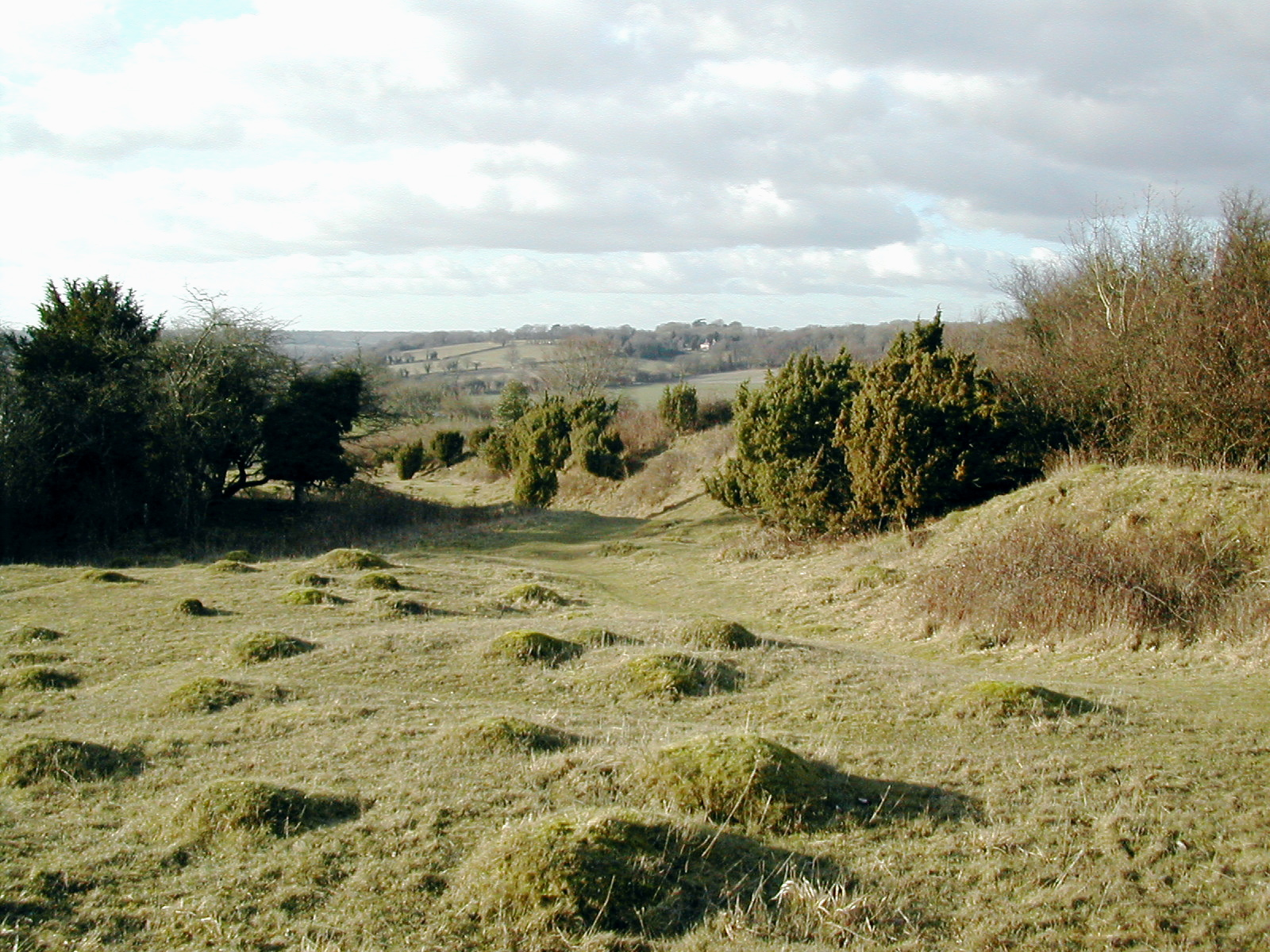
Looking north-west, towards the village of Newton Valence. Junipers thrive on the reserve.

The western flanks and much of the summit are given over to arable fields. A smaller part of the summit, 20 hectares (about 49 acres) known as High Common, is covered with downland grasses and scrub. The northern, eastern and southern flanks are covered by deciduous woodland dominated by beech. Such beechwoods on steep hills in East Hampshire are termed "hangers".

High Common is the site of mediaeval chalk-workings – chalk was dug out and spread on nearby fields as fertilizer. The excavations have left an irregular network of pits and hollows of varying size, depth, and steepness. Because the ground is so uneven, High Common remained unploughed for centuries and was only used for grazing. It retains the ancient chalk downland flora which elsewhere has largely been lost.

== Flora ==
The chalk-diggings not only made High Common unsuitable for ploughing, but also left bare chalk exposed. The many inclines and aspects of the disused pits provide different microclimates, all of which add to the variety of the flora.

Noar Hill is noted for its calcicoles (chalk-dwelling plants). These include hairy rock-cress (Arabis hirsuta), dropwort (Filipendula vulgaris), harsh downy-rose (Rosa tomentosa), pale flax (Linum bienne), common milkwort (Polygala vulgaris), marjoram (Origanum vulgare), wild thyme (two species: large thyme (Thymus pulegioides) and mother-of-thyme (Thymus polytrichus)), eyebright (Euphrasia nemorosa), and clustered bellflower (Campanula glomerata).

Small-leaved sweet-briar (Rosa agrestis) was recorded in 1978. Four bushes of box (Buxus sempervirens) growing on the landslip are considered by Dr Francis Rose to be native. Early gentian (Gentianella anglica) has been found (1951, 1988, 1994) on the bare chalk-scree. The parasitic knapweed broomrape (Orobanche elatior) is regularly recorded. Juniper (Juniperus communis) thrives; and in spring there is a beautiful display of cowslip (Primula veris).

There are occasional findings of dragon's-teeth (Tetragonolobus maritimus) and fern-grass (Catapodium rigidum).

However, the chief glory of Noar Hill derives from its orchids. At least eleven species have been identified:

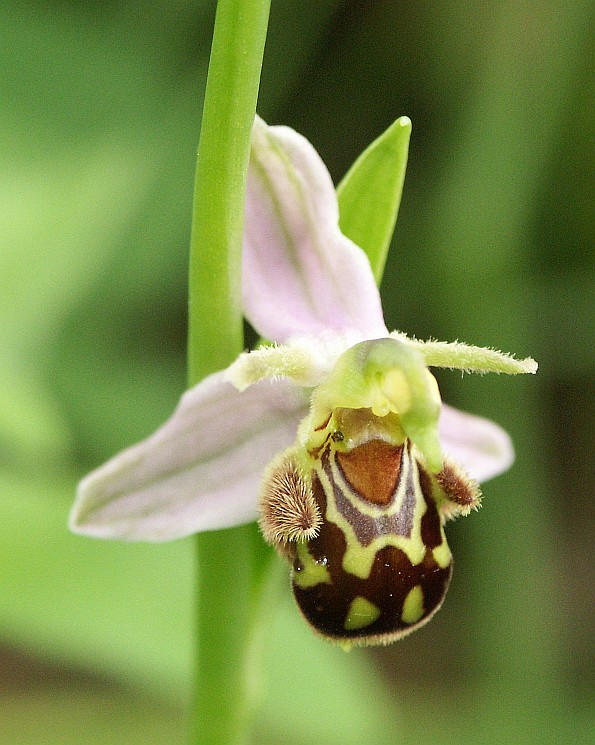
Bee orchid

1. Twayblade (Neottia ovata)
2. Autumn lady's tresses (Spiranthes spiralis)
3. Musk orchid (Herminium monorchis)
4. Pyramidal orchid (Anacamptis pyramidalis)
5. Fragrant orchid (Gymnadenia conopsea, including × Dactylodenia st-quintinii)
6. Frog orchid Coeloglossum viride, including × Dactyloglossum mixtum)
7. Common spotted orchid (Dactylorhiza fuchsii)
8. Southern marsh orchid (D. praetermissa)
9. Early purple orchid (Orchis mascula)
10. Fly orchid (Ophrys insectifera)
11. Bee orchid (Ophrys apifera)

The colony of musk orchids runs to approximately 10,000 spikes and is of national importance.

High Common, surrounded by botanically impoverished farmland, provides both a refuge for chalk downland species and a reservoir from which recolonization of nearby areas is possible. The habitat restoration being undertaken at Selborne Common may be one beneficiary.

== Fauna ==
Noar Hill is home to the only British species of the curious fairy shrimp (Chirocephalus diaphanus), which lives in puddles on the tracks and survives as an egg when the mud dries. Glow-worms (Lampyris noctiluca) are occasionally seen over the reserve on summer evenings. Grasshoppers abound, including the rufous grasshopper (Gomphocerippus rufus).

The butterflies include marbled white (Melanargia galathea), brown argus (Aricia agestis), Duke of Burgundy (Hamearis lucina), brown hairstreak (Thecla betulae), and holly blue (Celastrina argiolus), besides large numbers of more common species.

The reserve is a good place to look for slowworms (Anguis fragilis). It supports breeding turtle doves (Streptopelia turtur); and green woodpeckers (Picus viridis), which are fond of feeding on ants, are frequent. Several pairs of common buzzards (Buteo buteo) are resident in the area and the rabbits on High Common are a favourite prey. The hen harrier Circus cyaneus is an occasional winter visitor. For some reason – perhaps the abundance of rosehips – bullfinches (Pyrrhula pyrrhula) are always to be found upon the hill.
