= Wether Down =

Hill in Hampshire, England

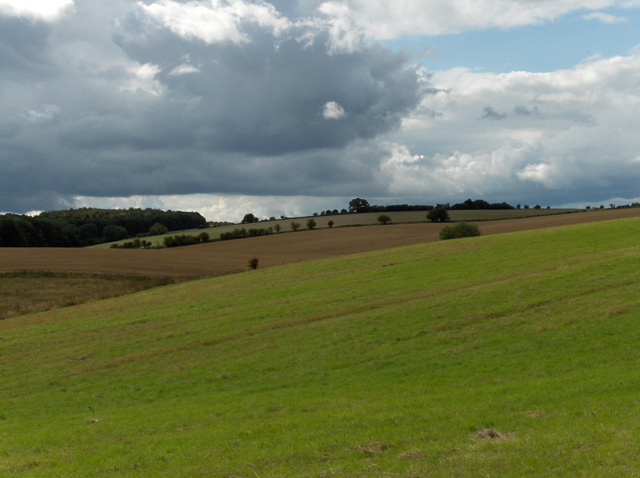
- View from Wether Down towards Betterton Down

Highest point
- Elevation: 234 m (768 ft)
- Prominence: 37 m (121 ft)
- Parent peak: Butser Hill
- Coordinates: 50°58′24″N 1°02′23″W

Geography
- Location: Hampshire, England
- Parent range: South Downs
- OS grid: SU675197
- Topo map: OS Landranger

Wether Down is one of the highest hills in the county of Hampshire, England, and in the South Downs, rising to 234 metres (768 ft) above sea level.

Wether Hill is largely treeless and there is a trig point and transmission mast at the summit. Cross dykes and a long barrow in the vicinity provide evidence of prehistoric settlement in the area.
