= Red Hill, Hampshire =

Hill in Hampshire, England

Red Hill
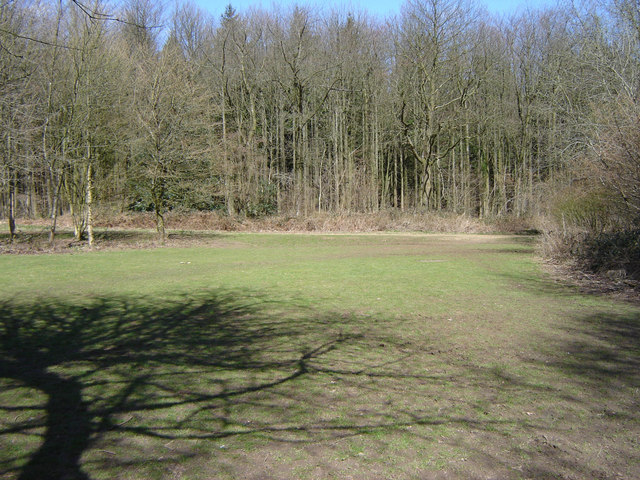
- Picnic area in Chawton Park Wood near the summit of Red Hill

Highest point
- Elevation: 221 m (725 ft)
- Prominence: 48 m (157 ft)
- Parent peak: Butser Hill
- Coordinates: 51°07′08″N 1°02′22″W

Geography
- Location: Hampshire, England
- Parent range: Hampshire Downs
- OS grid: SU672359
- Topo map: OS Landranger

Red Hill is one of the highest points in the county of Hampshire, England. It is part of the Hampshire Downs and rises to 221 metres (725 ft) above sea level.

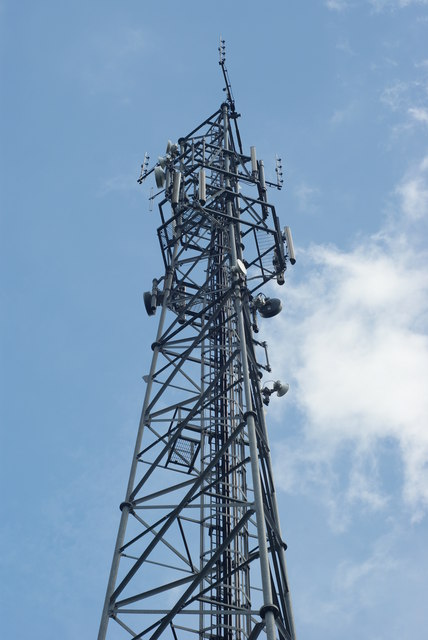
Fire tower on the summit of Red Hill

Red Hill lies on the edge of the Chawton Park Wood in the village of Chawton in Hampshire. There is a fire tower at the highest point.
