= Holybourne =

Village and parish in Hampshire, England

Coordinates: 51.163°N 0.950°W

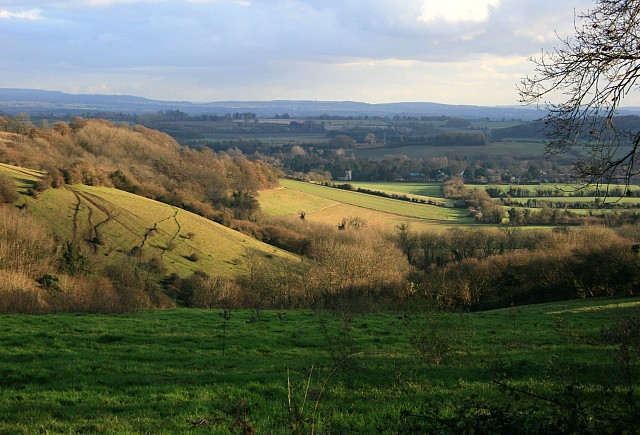
- Looking down on Holybourne from Holybourne Down. The wood (left centre) is Angels' Heaven and the church (centre) is Holy Rood

- Location within Hampshire
- OS grid reference: SU735409
- Civil parish: Alton
- District: East Hampshire
- Shire county: Hampshire
- Region: South East
- Country: England
- Sovereign state: United Kingdom
- Post town: Alton
- Postcode district: GU34
- Police: Hampshire and Isle of Wight
- Fire: Hampshire and Isle of Wight
- Ambulance: South Central
- UK Parliament: East Hampshire

Holybourne is a village in the civil parish of Alton, in the East Hampshire district of Hampshire, England. It is 1.3 miles (2.2 km) northeast of the centre of Alton, is contiguous with it and shares its A31 bypass. The nearest railway station is also in Alton.

The village has a population of around 1,500 and is where Treloar School is located. Holybourne has a pub, The White Hart, and a small store.

== History ==
Holybourne is recorded in the Domesday Book of 1086 as Haliborne and appears in 1418 as Halybourn.

The name is thought to be derived from the Old English Haligburna which means sacred stream, referring to the small stream whose spring is near Holybourne Church, whence it runs through the village.

English author Elizabeth Gaskell (1810–1865) bought a house in Holybourne in 1865. She died suddenly when visiting the house on 12 November 1865.

Being located close to the former RAF Lasham airfield, gliders are often spotted in the sky.

RAF Odiham is home to the British Chinooks, and has a flight path over the village at a low level, allowing good views of the aircraft.

Cuckoo's corner, near the end of the village, has the remains of a Roman road. Finds have been located in surrounding fields and cricket pitches.

In 1931, the civil parish had a population of 507. On 1 April 1932, the parish was abolished and merged with Alton.

=== Complins Brewery ===
In the nineteenth century, a brewery was established in Holybourne by Walter Complin, who died in 1890. By the start of the 20th century, it was run by John Fowler Complin. The site is now occupied by a residential area called Complins.

== Economy ==
There is one pub in the village, The White Hart, along with a small shop-cum-post office.

=== Holybourne Oil Terminal ===
In 1984, planning permission was granted for the Holybourne Oil Terminal, rail served by the Alton line, to be the trans-shipment point for production from the Humbly Grove oil field, Lasham, delivery of the oil to be by pipeline. In 1989, further permission was granted to deliver a limited amount of crude oil by road tanker. The freight trains serving Holybourne arrive at Holybourne Freight railway station.

== Church of the Holy Rood ==
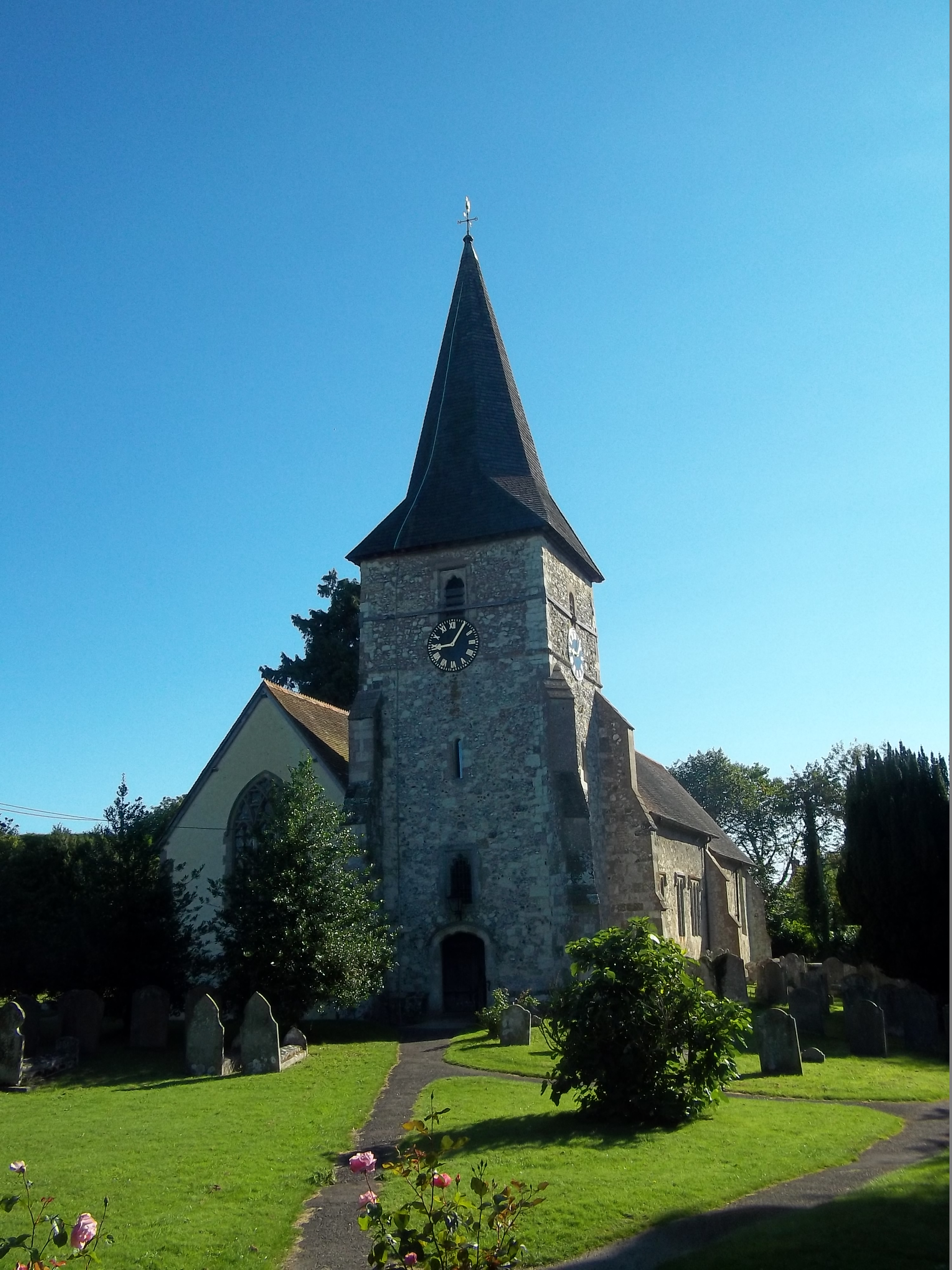
Church of the Holy Rood

The Church of the Holy Rood in Holybourne has foundations dating from the 12th century, and the nave, west end and lower part of the tower appear to date from this time. The chancel was added later, completing the building by the 13th century. However, two centuries later the floor of the building was raised, possibly because of nearby springs. The north aisle was replaced in 1879.

=== New bells ===
In autumn 2009, eight new bells manufactured at the Whitechapel Bell Foundry were installed in the church by Whites Bellhangers, of Appleton, Oxon, who cleaned up the existing three bells and re-hung them on a new bell frame installed higher up in the steeple and connected them back to the clock to continue their chiming role.

The new eight bells are in the key of B, and the heaviest (Bell No 8) weighs 6 cwt 3 qtrs 16 lb. They are inscribed and dedicated as follows:

- No 1 Bell: John Milne, writer, 1775–1817
- No 2 Bell: Elizabeth Gaskell, writer, 1810–1865
- No 3 Bell: William Curtis, botanist, 1746–1799
- No 4 Bell: Alfred Munnings, painter, 1878–1959 (the famous equestrian artist, who resided at The White Hart, Holybourne).
- No 5 Bell: Edmund Spenser, poet, 1552–1599
- No 6 Bell: Edward Thomas, poet, 1878–1917
- No 7 Bell: Izaak Walton, angler and biographer, 1593–1683
- No 8 Bell: Rev. Gilbert White, curate and naturalist, 1720–1793

On Sunday, 11 October 2009, there was a Service of Consecration of the eight new bells. On Sunday, 15 November 2009, there was a Service of Dedication by Michael Harley, the Archdeacon of Winchester.

== Notable people ==
- Alan Titchmarsh, broadcaster and gardener, has lived in the village since the early 2000s.

== See also ==
- Holybourne Hill, one of the highest points in Hampshire, rises nearby.
