= Plestor House, Selborne =

House in Selborne, Hampshire, England

Coordinates: 51.0975°N 0.9429°W

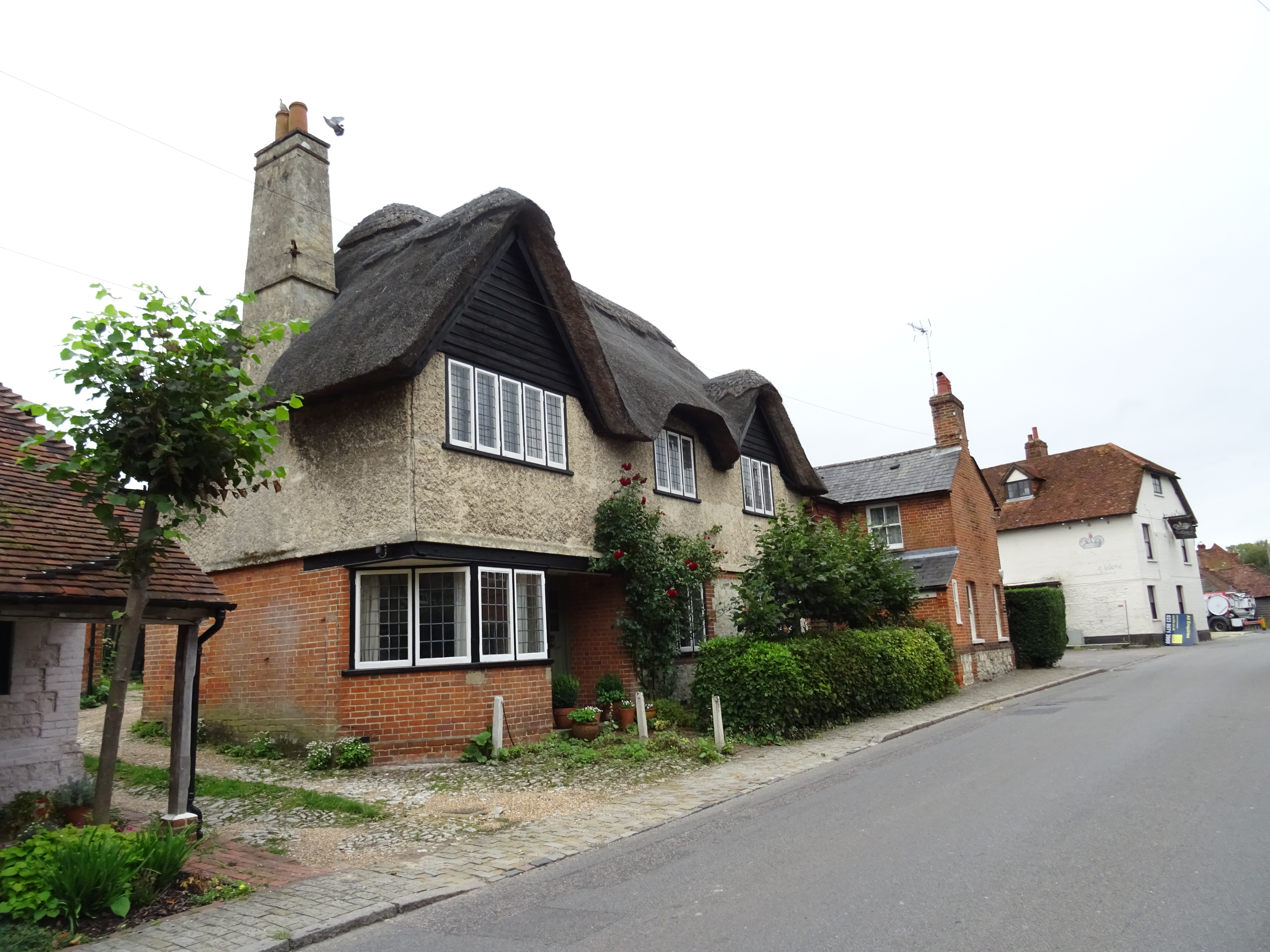

Plestor House is a house in the centre of Selborne, Hampshire, England. The house is named for its location — adjacent to the village's plestor. Architecturally, the house has grown over the centuries. The oldest section, that facing the village green (known as The Plestor — from the Saxon words pleg stow, meaning play space), dates from the third quarter of the 17th century. The roof incorporates fire-blackened timbers which have been dated by dendrochronology to the early 14th century, and it is thought that they come from the house which previously stood on the site. A recent excavation of the cellar unearthed Tudor bricks, which were also fire-damaged and may therefore point to the fate of the house's predecessor.

The second section of the house dates from 1783, according to a stone set into the upper storey. The mortar lines between the local malmstones of this section are studded with pieces of iron, a local characteristic known as galletting. The most recent addition came at the turn of the 20th century. It effectively filled in the square formed by the L-shape of the two older wings.

Attached to the house is an ancient building which was the first site of the village school. The school was originally endowed in 1728, under the will of the grandfather of Gilbert White, the early naturalist.

The north-east corner of the house appears in one of the plates in the first edition of Gilbert White's famous book, The Natural History and Antiquities of Selborne (1789).

The house is now listed Grade II as being of architectural significance.
