= Selborne Hill =

Hill in Hampshire, England

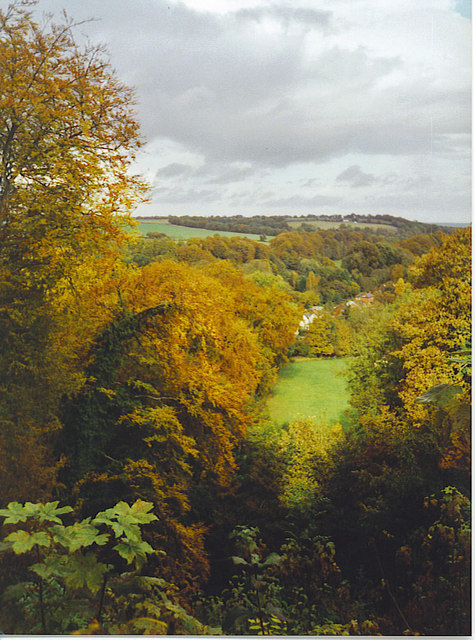
- View of Zig-Zag Walk from Selborne Hanger.

Highest point
- Elevation: 211 m (692 ft)
- Prominence: 53 m (174 ft)
- Parent peak: Butser Hill
- Coordinates: 51.0926°N 0.9498°W

Geography
- Location: Hampshire, England
- Parent range: Hampshire Downs, East Hampshire Hangers
- OS grid: SU736331
- Topo map: OS Landranger

Selborne Hill is one of the highest points in the county of Hampshire, England. It is one of the East Hampshire Hangers, a line of prominent hills on the eastern scarp slope of the Hampshire Downs, and reaches 211 metres (692 ft) above sea level. Its prominence of 53 metres qualifies it as one of the county's Tumps.

Selborne Hill lies above the village of Selborne on the edge of the Hampshire Downs, its crown playing host to Selborne Common, an area of woodland and relict wood-pasture. Its summit and steep escarpment are covered by woods, with Selborne Hanger to the northeast dropping abruptly to the fields above Selborne. The Zig-Zag Path runs down the spur towards the east. This is the area where the world famous naturalist and pioneer of birdwatching, Rev. Gilbert White, wrote his celebrated Natural History of Selborne.
