= Farleigh Hill =

Hill in Hampshire, England

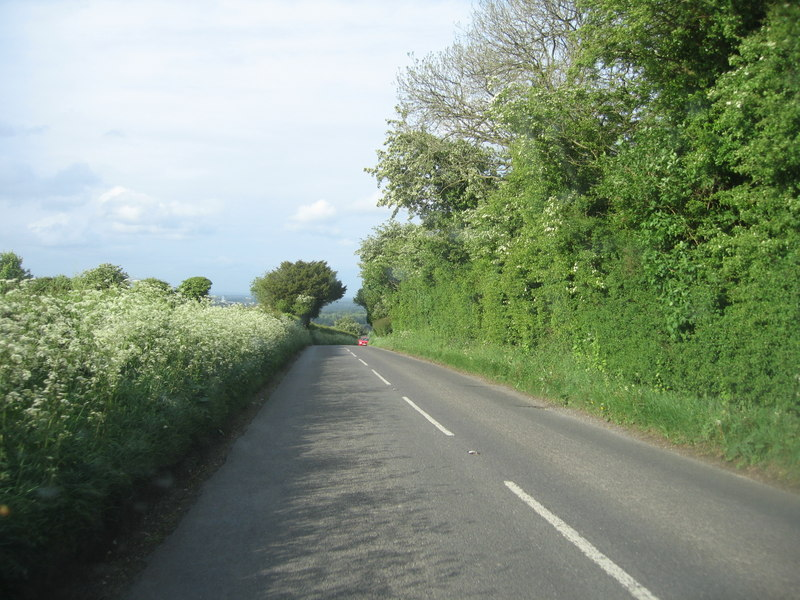
- Road at the summit of Farleigh Hill as it begins to descend into Cliddesden

Highest point
- Elevation: 208 m (682 ft)
- Prominence: 34 m (112 ft)
- Parent peak: Butser Hill
- Listing: TuMP
- Coordinates: 51°13′15″N 1°07′06″W

Geography
- Location: Hampshire, England
- Parent range: Hampshire Downs
- OS grid: SU616472
- Topo map: OS Landranger

Farleigh Hill is one of the highest points in the county of Hampshire, England. It is part of the Hampshire Downs and reaches a height of 208 metres (682 ft) above sea level. Its prominence of 34 metres (112 ft) just qualifies it as a ('P30') TuMP.

Farleigh Hill rises about 1 kilometre southeast of the M3 and the outskirts of Basingstoke in Hampshire. The B 3046 runs over the hill from southwest to northeast, passing within about 100 metres of the summit at a crossroads. In the vicinity are a number of houses and lodges, and Farleigh House School and Farleigh Wallop lie on the southeastern spur of the hill. The village of Cliddesden lies on the same road about 2 kilometres to the northeast.
