= Holybourne Hill =

Hill in Hampshire, England

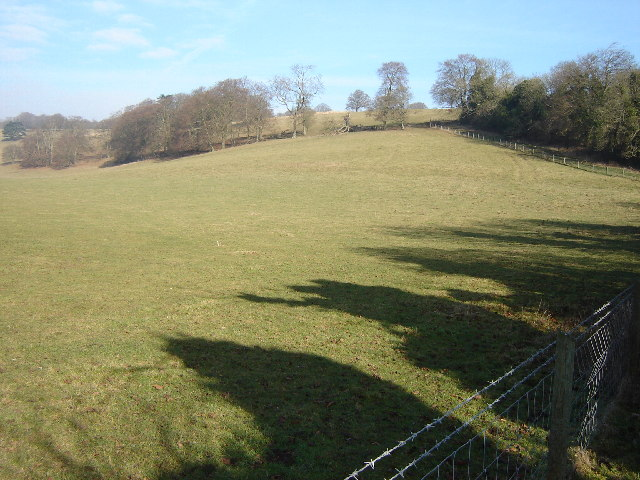
- Holybourne Down with the line of an old Roman road passing through the centre of the image.

Highest point
- Elevation: 225 m (738 ft)
- Prominence: 64 m (210 ft)
- Parent peak: Butser Hill
- Coordinates: 51°11′15″N 0°57′50″W

Geography
- Location: Hampshire, England
- Parent range: Hampshire Downs
- OS grid: SU725437
- Topo map: OS Landranger

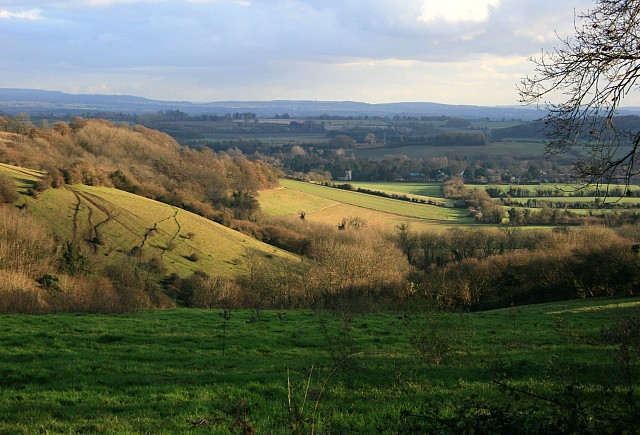
Looking down on Holybourne from Holybourne Down. The wood (left centre) is Angels' Heaven and the church (centre) is Holy Rood

Holybourne Hill or Holybourne Down is one of the highest points in the county of Hampshire, England, and in the Hampshire Downs, rising to 225 metres (738 ft) above sea level.

Holybourne Hill rises not far from the village of Holybourne in Hampshire.
