= Holybourne Freight railway station =

Railway station in Hampshire, England

Coordinates: 51.1669°N 0.9360°W

Holybourne Freight railway station is where freight trains serving Holybourne Oil Terminal terminate. These freight trains ran daily from Bentley and Alton. Because the line is single-track between Bentley and Alton for a small amount of the way, when a freight train needs to go to there, one of the normal passenger trains terminates at Farnham, or occasionally Aldershot.

The nearest passenger railway station is Bentley.
