= Selborne Common =

Protected area in Hampshire, England

Coordinates: 51°06′00″N 0°57′00″W

- Site of Special Scientific Interest
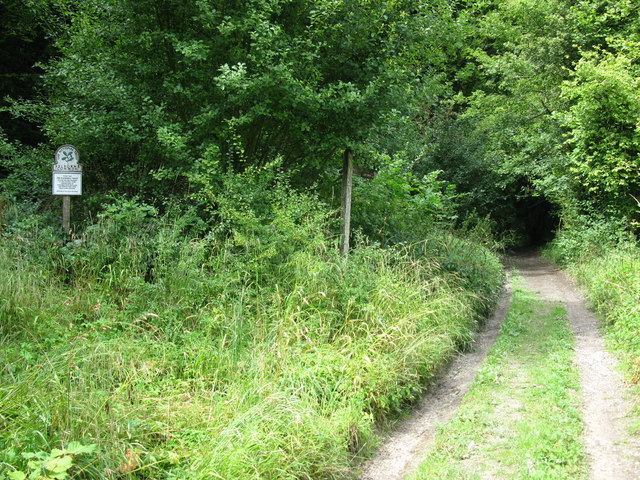
- Entrance to Selborne Common
- Location of Selborne Common.
- Area of search: Hampshire
- Grid reference: SU 733 331
- Interest: Biological
- Area: 99.6 hectares (246 acres)
- Notification date: 1986
- Location map: Magic Map

Selborne Common is a 99.6-hectare (246-acre) biological Site of Special Scientific Interest west of Selborne in Hampshire. It is a Nature Conservation Review site, Grade I, and is part of the East Hampshire Hangers Special Area of Conservation. It is managed by the National Trust.

== Topography ==
The Common occupies the crown of Selborne Hill, an easterly guardian of the Hampshire Downs. The highest part has an elevation of 680 feet (210 m) above sea level. The southerly and westerly flanks slope away gently; on the other sides the contours are steeper. The steepest slope of all, with a maximum gradient of about 50%, overlooks the village and is called "Selborne Hanger". To the west of this is Coneycroft Hill, which in places is almost as precipitous. Between Selborne Hanger and Coneycroft Hill is a deep dell.

== Geology ==
The soil on the Common consists of clay with flints, overlying the chalk of which the South Downs are made. The watercourses are underground and discharge into the Oakhanger Stream, flowing north-eastwards, and the Caker Stream, flowing northwards. Both ultimately join the River Wey.

== Flora ==
The steepest slopes are clad in ancient beechwood (Fagus sylvatica): a "hanger", in East Hampshire, is just such a beechwood. The plateau is occupied by more beechwood, mixed with other broad-leaved species such as English oak (Quercus robur), ash (Fraxinus excelsior) and hawthorn (Crataegus monogyna), and in places is scrubby. A small part of the plateau comprises open grassland with scattered gorse (Ulex europaeus) and stands of bracken (Pteridium aquilinum). Other, smaller areas of chalk grassland have recently been recreated elsewhere.

The Common is noted for its wild flowers, with thriving communities of yellow archangel (Galeobdolon luteum), wood spurge (Euphorbia amygdaloides) and wood anemone (Anemone nemorosa). Spurge-laurel (Daphne laureola) is sparsely but widely distributed. The Common is also home to such interesting species as stinking hellebore (Helleborus foetidus), green hellebore (H. viridis ssp. occidentalis), bird's nest orchid (Neottia nidus-avis), violet helleborine (Epipactis purpurata), the extreme rarity E. x schulzei (first British record here, 1931), and green-flowered helleborine (E. phyllanthes).

== Fauna ==
Various rare molluscs and insects have been recorded. Butterflies on the Common include the Duke of Burgundy (Hamearis lucina), silver-washed fritillary (Argynnis paphia) and purple emperor (Apatura iris).

The avifauna includes most of the species typical of broad-leaved woodland in southern England, such as sparrowhawk (Accipter nisus), stock dove (Columba oenas), tawny owl (Strix aluco), European green woodpecker (Picus viridis), great spotted woodpecker (Dendrocopos major), garden warbler (Sylvia borin), blackcap (S. atricapilla), chiffchaff (Phylloscopus collybita), spotted flycatcher (Muscicapa striata), marsh tit (Parus palustris), nuthatch (Sitta europaea), treecreeper (Certhia familiaris) and jay (Garrulus glandarius).

Buzzards (Buteo buteo) regularly hunt over the tree canopy. Hobby (Falco subbuteo), woodcock (Scolopax rusticola), common firecrest (Regulus ignicapillus) and brambling (Fringilla montifringilla) are occasional visitors. Selborne Common is a reliable place to find the wood warbler (Phylloscopus sibilatrix).

Roe deer (Capreolus capreolus) and dormouse (Muscardinus avellanarius) are resident mammals.

== History and management ==
From the prehistoric or Romano-British period there is evidence of a field system, which may have been re-used during the Middle Ages. The Common has not been ploughed since then.

Earthworks on the western boundary have tentatively been dated to the mid thirteenth century, when Newton Park was emparked. An earth bank, running across the Common, has been dated to around 1750 and was probably used to protect coppice woodland from grazing animals.

During the eighteenth century, the lord of the manor felled beeches on the Common. Local people exercised their common rights to graze cattle and sheep and to collect firewood, activities which continued into the 1950s.

In mediaeval times the nearby Selborne Priory was lord of the manor of Selborne; the manor subsequently passed to Magdalen College, Oxford, which donated it to the National Trust in 1932. Cattle have recently been reintroduced in an attempt to reconstruct the ancient, flower-rich, wood-pasture habitat which commoning produced and which has almost disappeared from England.

A dew pond, Wood Pond, is situated near the western boundary.

== Gilbert White ==
Selborne Common is internationally famous for its association with the eighteenth-century naturalist, Gilbert White.

== Access ==
The Common is freely accessible to all, subject to the National Trust's byelaws. It is best approached from Selborne, via the (steep) Zig-Zag or Bostal paths (car park behind the Selborne Arms public house, Ordnance Survey reference SU742335). A more level track leads to the Common from Newton Valence; footpaths join it also from the south-east and north-west. After rain and especially in winter, some paths can become very muddy.

Selborne Common is on the Hangers Way.

== Bibliography ==
- Brewis, Anne, et al. (1996) The Flora of Hampshire. Harley Books, ISBN 0-946589-53-4
- Summary of the archaeology by Chris Webb, Property Manager
- The Common Lands of Hampshire and the Isle of Wight: A Biological Survey
- National Trust page about Selborne Common
