= Sidown Hill =

Hill in Hampshire, England

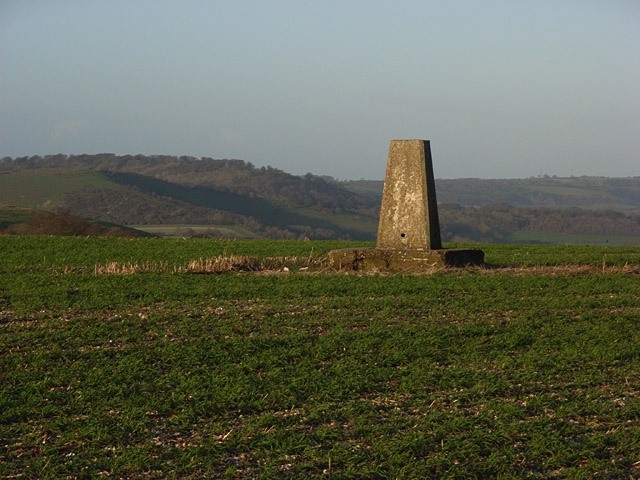
- View from Watership Down across to the wooded Sidown Hill, just beyond Beacon Hill.

Highest point
- Elevation: 266 m (873 ft)
- Prominence: 34 m (112 ft)
- Parent peak: Walbury Hill
- Coordinates: 51.3144°N 1.36143°W

Geography
- Location: Highclere, Hampshire, England
- Parent range: North Hampshire Downs
- OS grid: SU444573
- Topo map: OS Landranger

At 255 metres (837 ft), Sidown Hill is the third highest hill in the county of Hampshire, England.

At the summit is a mid-18th century Grade II listed building known as Heaven's Gate which is hidden by the trees covering the top of the hill.

The hill is on the watershed of the Hampshire Basin and forms part of the Hampshire Downs. To the east is Beacon Hill (261 metres (856 ft)).

On 5 May 1945 a USAAF B-17 Flying Fortress of 326th Bombardment Squadron crashed on Sidown Hill with the loss of six of its crew of seven.
