= South Hampshire Lowlands =

Natural country area in Hampshire, England

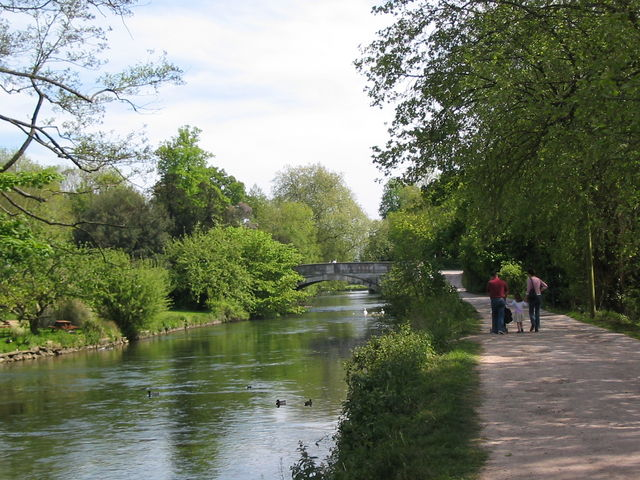
The River Test near Romsey

The South Hampshire Lowlands form a natural landscape in south, central England within the county of Hampshire.

The UK Government's advisors on the natural environment, Natural England, have named the South Hampshire Lowlands as one of their National Character Areas (No. 128). This covers 38,635 hectares of countryside running from Totton and Southampton in the west to Havant in the east. It excludes the coastal strip containing Fareham and Portsmouth, however.

The area consists of low-lying land between the chalk outcrops of the South Downs and Hampshire Downs and the coast of the Solent and English Channel. To the west The highest point within the South Hampshire Lowlands is Portsdown Hill at 123 metres (404 ft) above sea level.

The major settlements of the South Hampshire Lowlands are Romsey, Eastleigh, Bishops Waltham, Havant and, of course, the city of Southampton itself.
