= Beacon Hill, Burghclere, Hampshire =

Hill in Burghclere, Hampshire, England

Burghclere Beacon
- Site of Special Scientific Interest
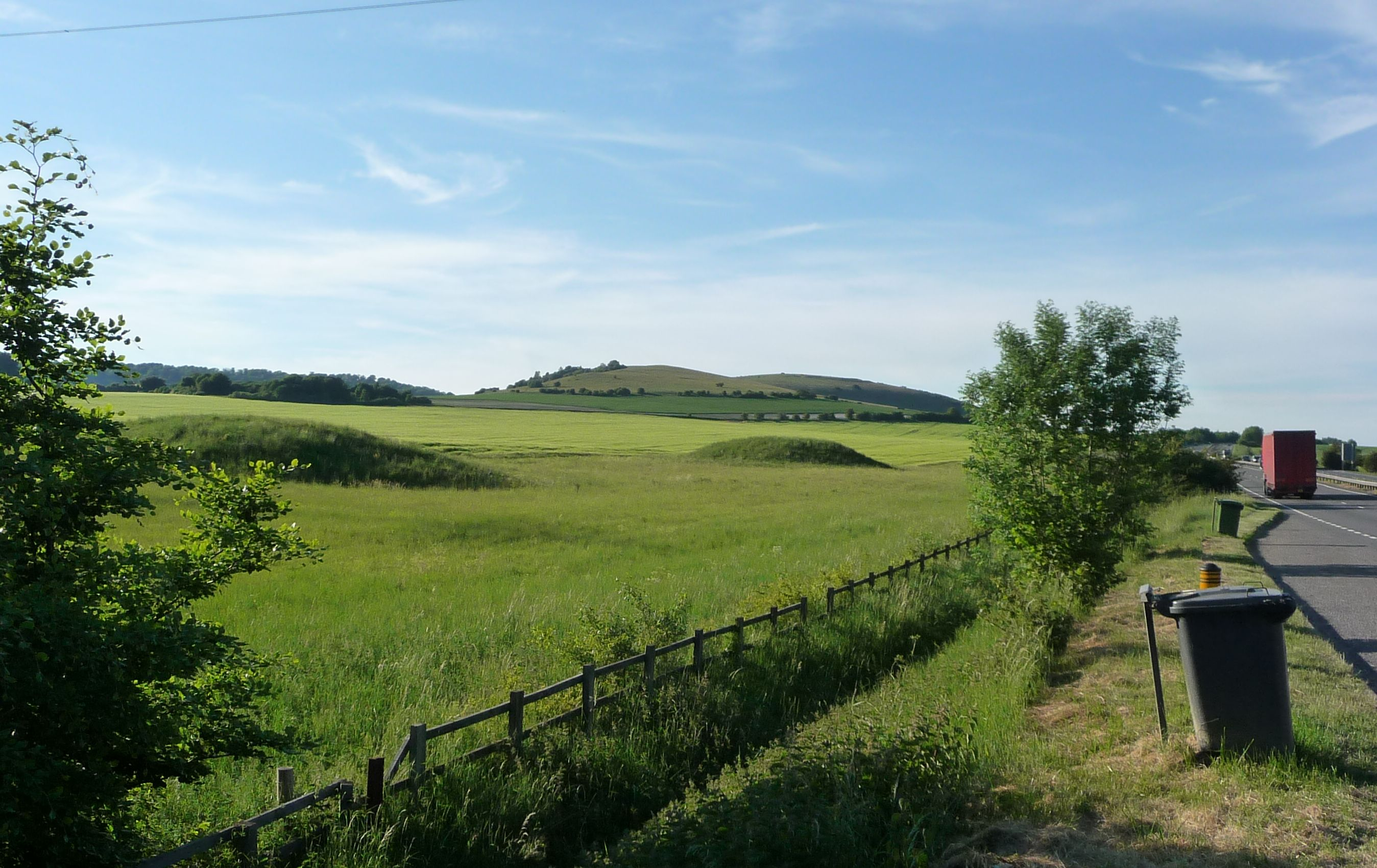

- Location within Hampshire
- Location of Burghclere Beacon.
- Area of search: Hampshire
- Grid reference: SU 458 570
- Coordinates: 51°18′46″N 1°20′37″W
- Interest: Biological
- Area: 80.7 hectares (199 acres)
- Notification date: 1984
- Location map: Magic Map

There are several hills in Hampshire called Beacon Hill; another is near Warnford.

Beacon Hill

Highest point
- Elevation: 261 m (856 ft)
- Coordinates: 51°18′46″N 1°20′37″W

Geography
- Location: Hampshire, England
- OS grid: SU458573
- Topo map: OS Landranger 174

Beacon Hill is near the village of Burghclere and Watership Down, in north Hampshire. The hill's name is derived from the fact that it was one of many Beacon Hills in England and beyond. This hill was once the site of the most famous beacon in Hampshire. It is 261 metres high and has one of England's most well known hill forts on its slopes, visible from the main A34 road which passes close by. From there, outstanding views of the surrounding area and much of Hampshire may be obtained. The site is open to the public and managed by Hampshire County Council. It is an 80.7-hectare (199-acre) biological Site of Special Scientific Interest called Burghclere Beacon and a Nature Conservation Review site, Grade I.

== Ecology ==
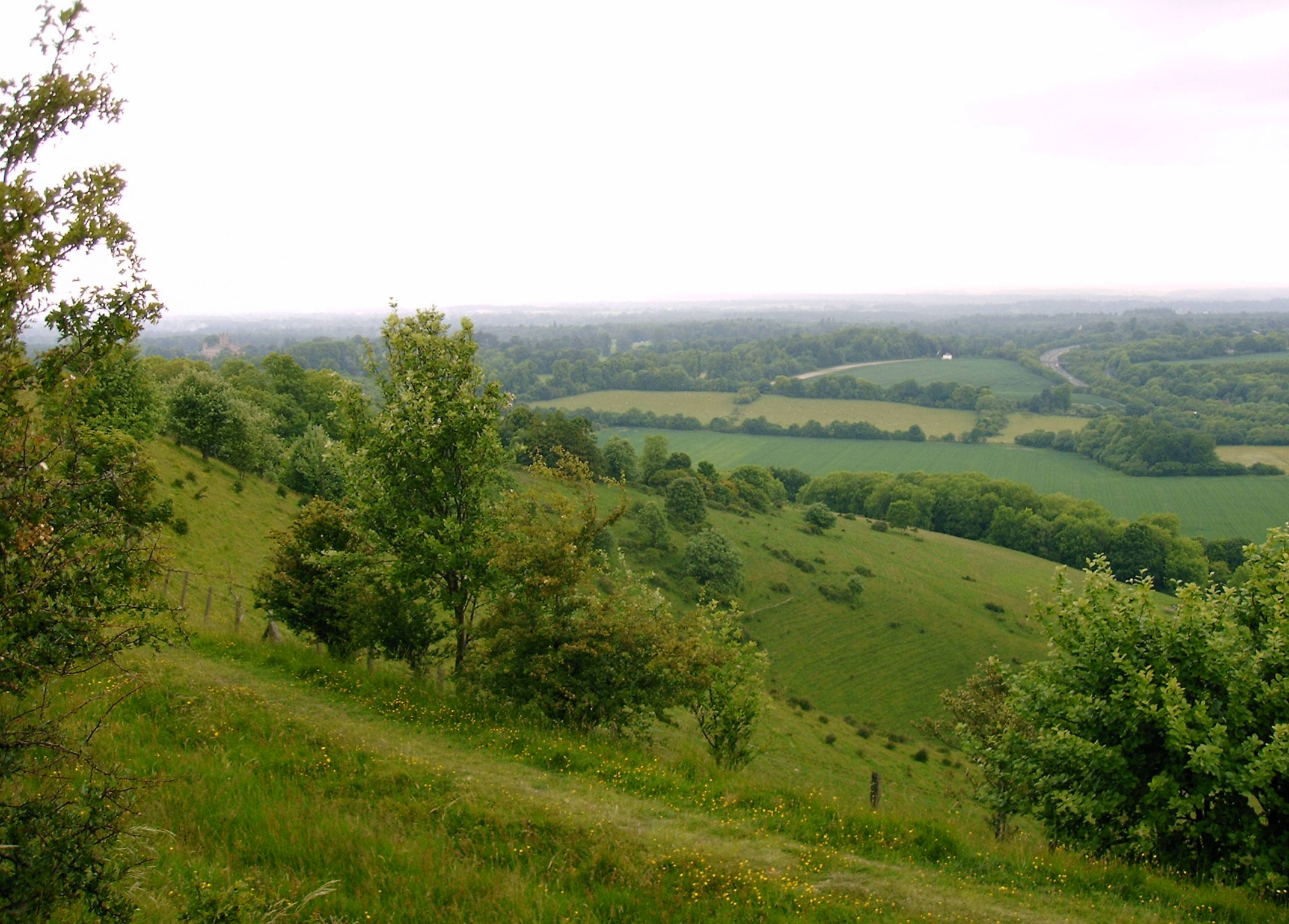
View to the north with Highclere Castle visible on the left and the A34 road to the right

Beacon Hill is a calcareous grassland chalk downland habitat and as such is scarce and home to some unusual and rare species. Many chalk grassland slopes in England show the mark of centuries of grazing by sheep, the slopes bearing a stepped appearance formed by a mixture of soil creep and sheep paths. Such erosion is clearly visible on the slopes of Beacon Hill.

The site includes an extensive stand of juniper Juniperus communis, privet Ligustrum vulgare, buckthorn Rhamnus catharticus, rose Rosa spp., bramble Rubus spp., wayfaring tree Viburnum lantana and hawthorn (Crataegus monogyna) and whitebeam Sorbus aria, which covers circa 20 ha to the west-facing slopes. There is little evidence of juniper regeneration (and some moribund bushes) and the site is probably witnessing a transition from juniper to a mixed scrub community, with the early indications of an eventual succession of woodland. The scrub is unusual on the chalk in lacking a yew Taxus baccata and ash Fraxinus excelsior component.

The open grassland is rich in herbs, with fescues Festuca ovina and Festuca pratensis, crested dog's tail Cynosurus cristatus, spring sedge Carex caryophyllea, and locally quaking grass Briza media as dominants. Abundant herbs include ladys’ bedstraw Galium vernum, hedge bedstraw Galium mollugo, creeping thistle Cirsium acaule, fairy flax Linum catharticum, bird's-foot trefoil Lotus corniculatus, horseshoe vetch Hippocrepis comosa, kidney vetch Anthyllis vulneraria, chalk milkwort Polygala calcarea and felwort Gentianella amarella and several species of orchids. There is also Rock Rose, Wild Thyme, and Clustered Bellflower. These flowers in turn provide for rare invertebrates such as Osmia bicolor, a scarce solitary bee. There is a decidedly neutral element in the flora which suggests that the soils may in part be derived from superficial drift or loess.

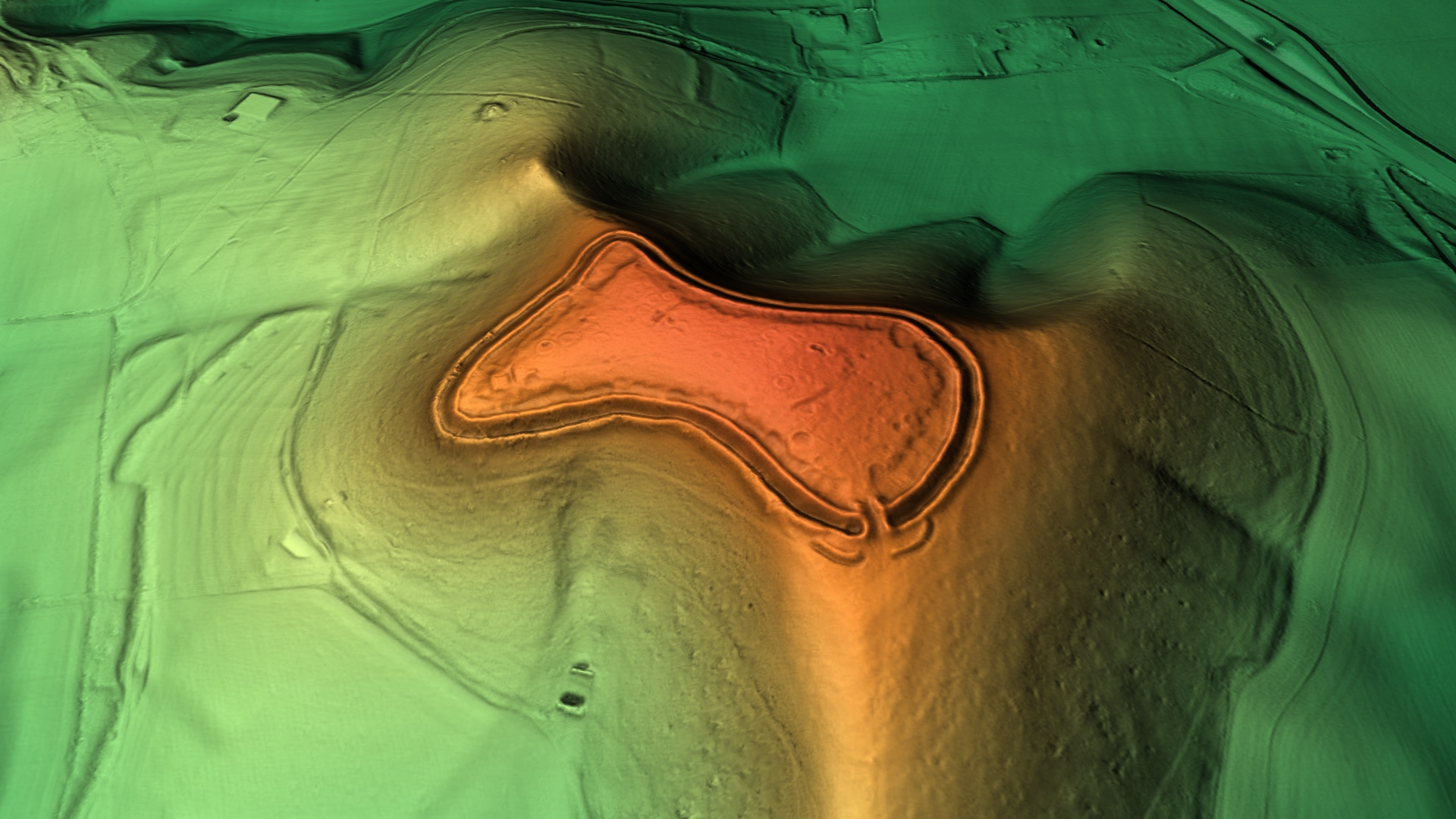
3D view of the digital terrain model

In a national survey carried out in the early 1970s, the chalk scrub element of the SSSI is recognised as being a nationally important example of a stage in the succession from juniper scrub to woodland. The chalk grassland within the SSSI includes a wide range of aspect and soils and in particular include chalk grassland developed on gradients which elsewhere have mostly been converted to arable or ley.

== Archaeology ==
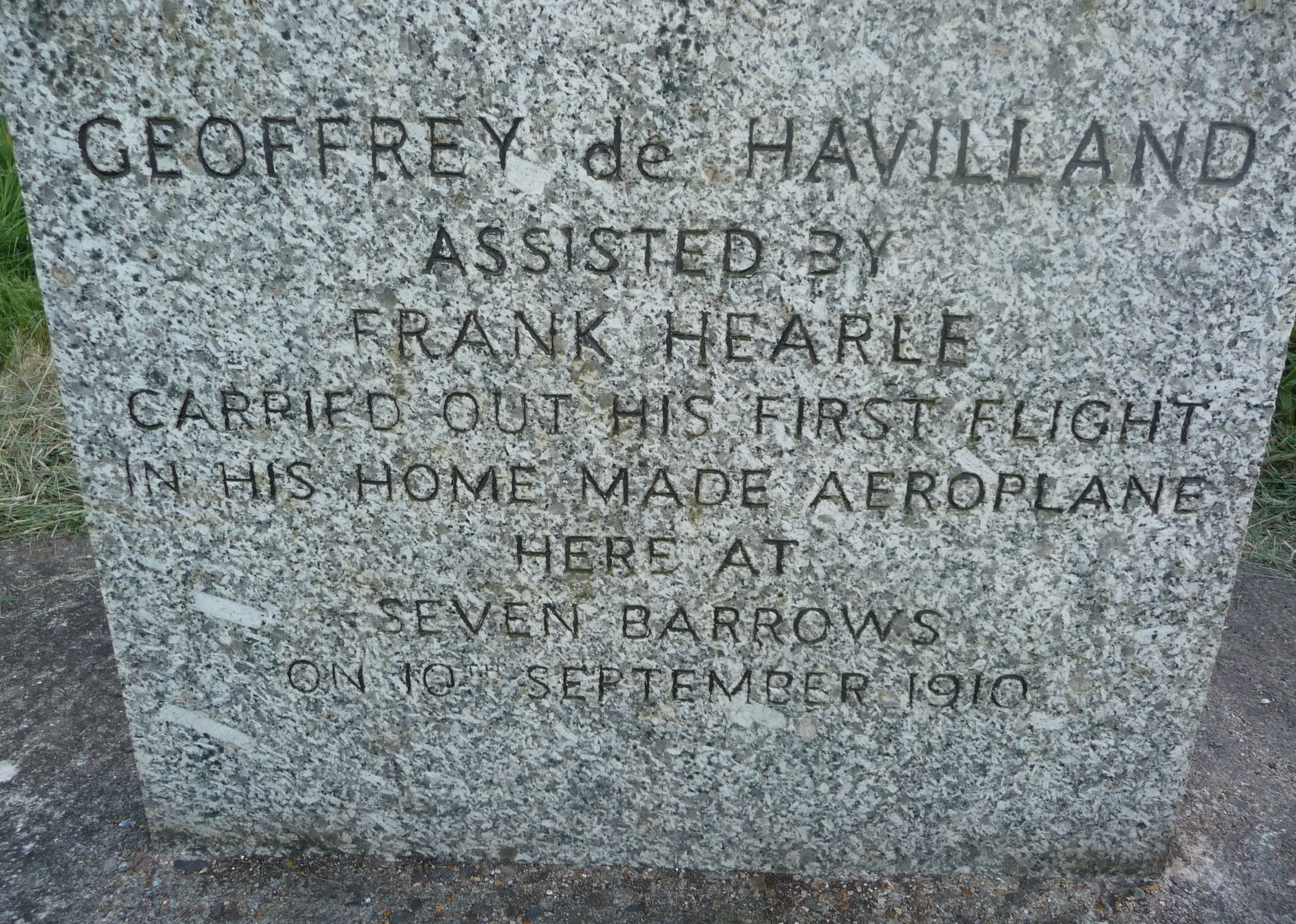
De Havilland Memorial Stone near Seven Barrows Field and Beacon Hill from A34

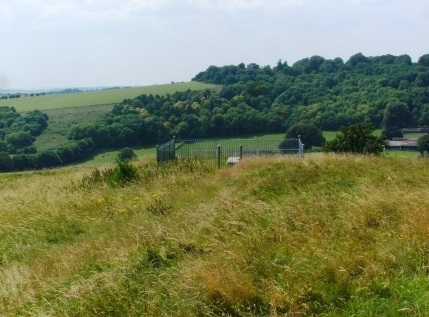
View of Beacon Hill with the tomb of George Herbert, 5th Earl of Carnarvon

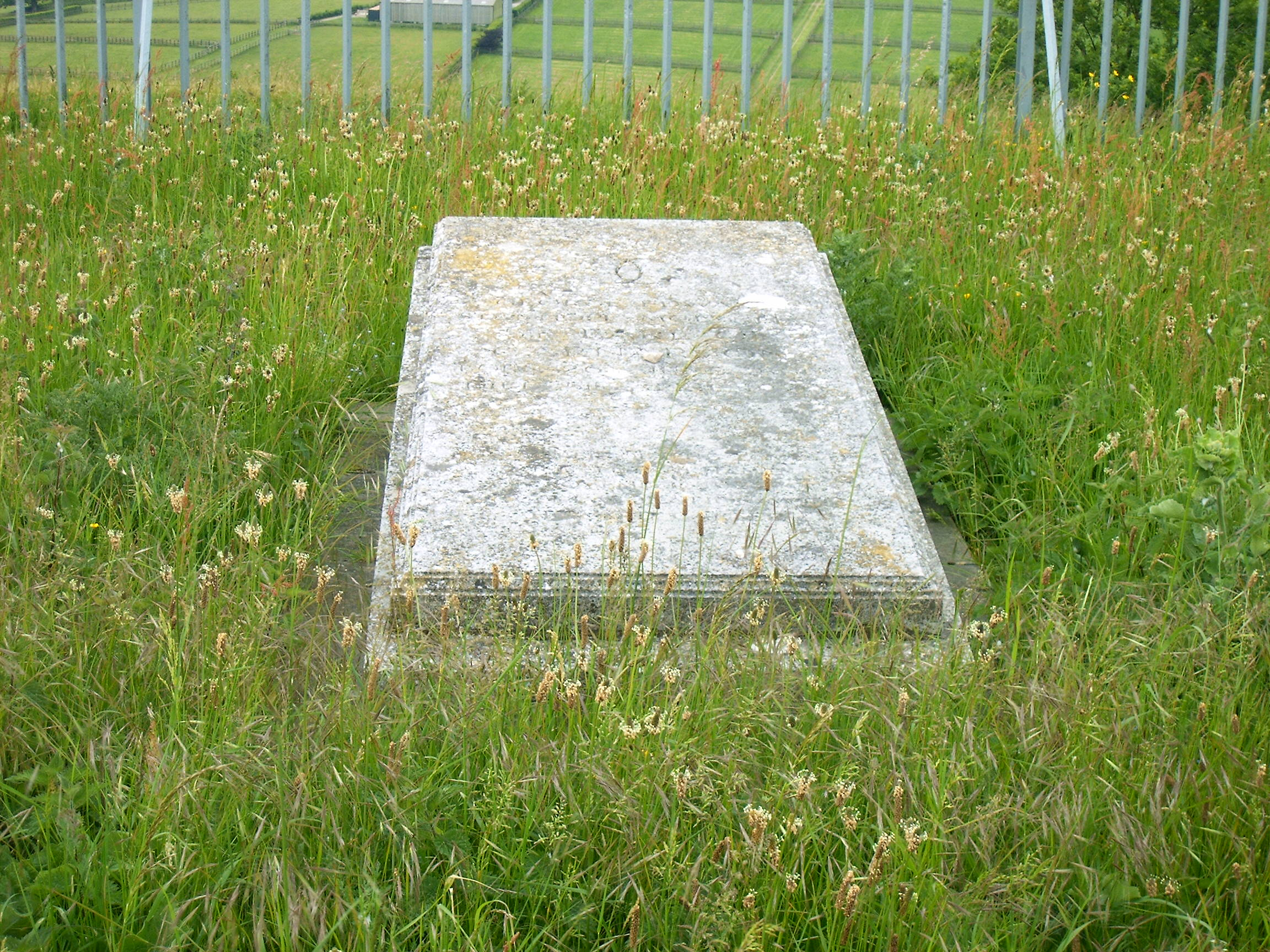
Gravestone of George Herbert, 5th Earl of Carnarvon

The hill fort on the top of the hill has never been systematically excavated, but the land and ditch are sharply defined and well preserved. The Beacon Hill camp, (scheduled ancient monument number 7) built around 1000 BC, was probably inhabited by around 2–3000 people according to calculations from similar camps. It is one of a number of hillforts, which are strung out along the north-facing scarp of the Hampshire Downs, overlooking the Kennet valley to the north. When originally built, these structures must have looked spectacular even from a distance as their white chalk ramparts caught the sun.

Within the ramparts of the fort are some fifteen contemporary hut sites comprising horseshoe shape scoops and circular enclosures, some of which can be seen by the casual visitor. The south-facing entrance is still well defined and a track would have led southwards towards an area of fields which are still apparent at the far end of the hill. Aerial photographs show considerable evidence of ancient field patterns throughout much of the surrounding countryside. On the west side of Sidown Hill (immediately to the west of Beacon Hill) there is an area of well defined field terracing.

North of Beacon Hill there is a Bronze Age Bowl Barrow (scheduled ancient monument number 290) sited in a fir plantation and covered with trees.

150 yards south of Beacon Hill Camp is a Bronze Age round Barrow (scheduled ancient monument number 318)

On the hill there are two lynchets halfway down the north slope, with a number of later hollow-ways encroaching upon them.

The beacon on the hill here passed the Hampshire warning on from the county to Cuckhamsiey Beacon in Berkshire. Nearby excavations revealed red brick and flint fireplace pottery, tobacco pipes amongst other items. This was presumably the site of a shelter hut for the men who watched the bonfire.

The tomb of the famous Egyptologist, George Herbert, 5th Earl of Carnarvon lies within the fortifications. It is also where Sir Geoffrey de Havilland made his first successful test flight on 10 September 1910, commemorated by a memorial stone situated in the Seven Barrows field to the south of Beacon Hill.

== Location ==
The site is located at grid reference SU458573, to the southwest of the village of Old Burghclere, in the county of Hampshire. The hill has a summit of 261m AOD. Nearby to the east lies Ladle Hill and further east is Watership Down. Also to the north east lies Old Burghclere Lime Quarry SSSI. The A34 runs between Beacon Hill and Ladle Hill to the east. To the west lies Sidown Hill.
