= East Hampshire Hangers =

Line of hills in Hampshire, England

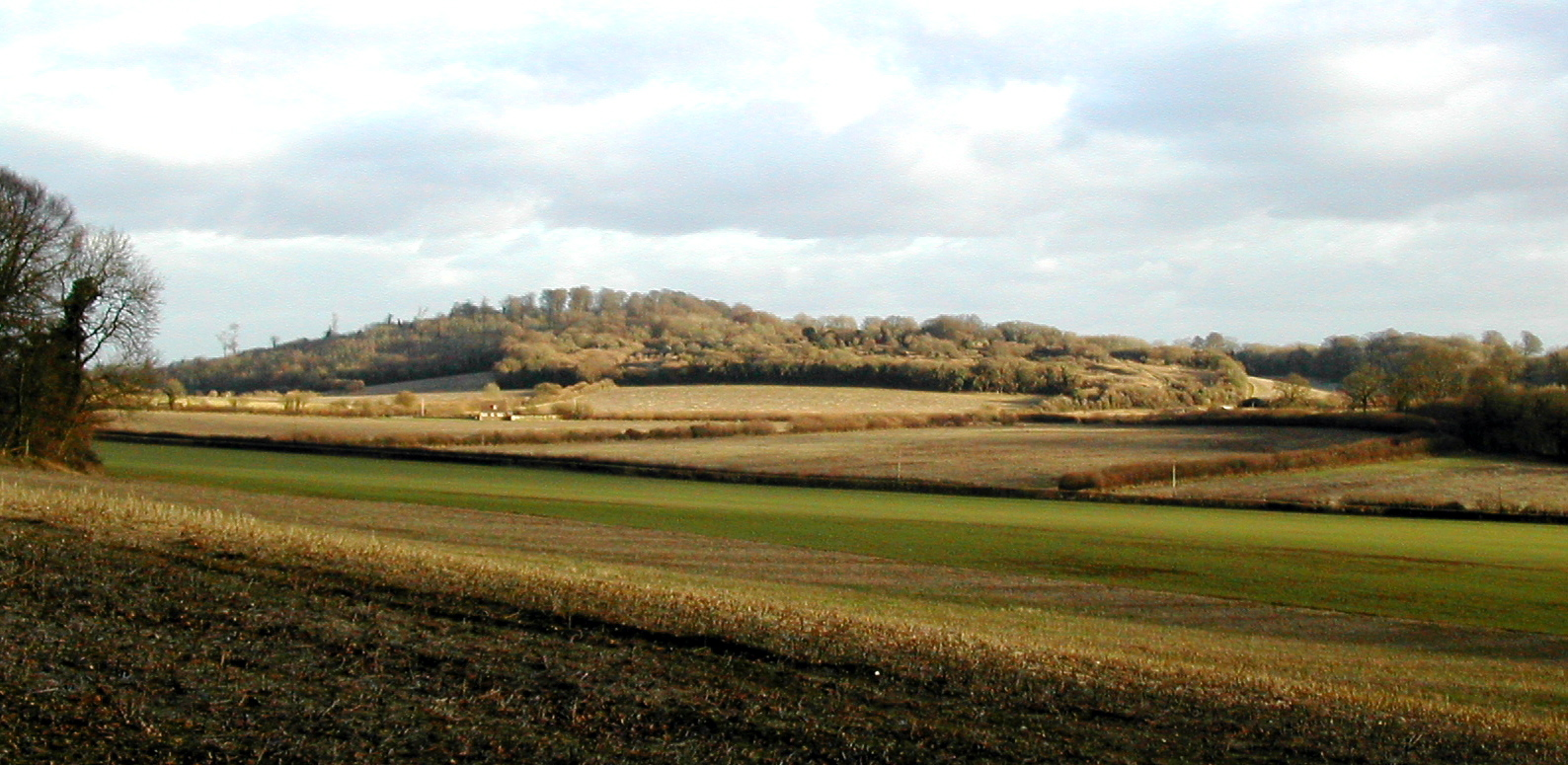
Noar Hill, one of the East Hampshire Hangers

The East Hampshire Hangers are located in the English county of Hampshire and form a line of hills with steep scarps that marks the eastern edge of the Hampshire Downs and its boundary with the Western Weald, an area of rolling countryside east of Petersfield and Liss. The Hangers run from the area of Farnham to Petersfield, before swinging eastwards to take in the north-facing scarp of the South Downs. The main settlements of the area are the villages of Selborne, Hawkley and East Worldham. The name is derived from the "hangers": long, narrow remnants of ancient woodland clinging to the steep scarp slopes. Examples include Milking Hanger, Warner's Hanger and Wick Hill Hanger.

The area is an historic landscape and has been designated as a Special Area of Conservation covering around 577 hectares (1,430 acres).

High points of the Hangers include: Wheatham Hill (249 metres (817 ft)), Noar Hill (214 metres (702 ft)), Selborne Hill (211 metres (692 ft)) and Shoulder of Mutton Hill.
