= Farley Mount =

Hill in United Kingdom

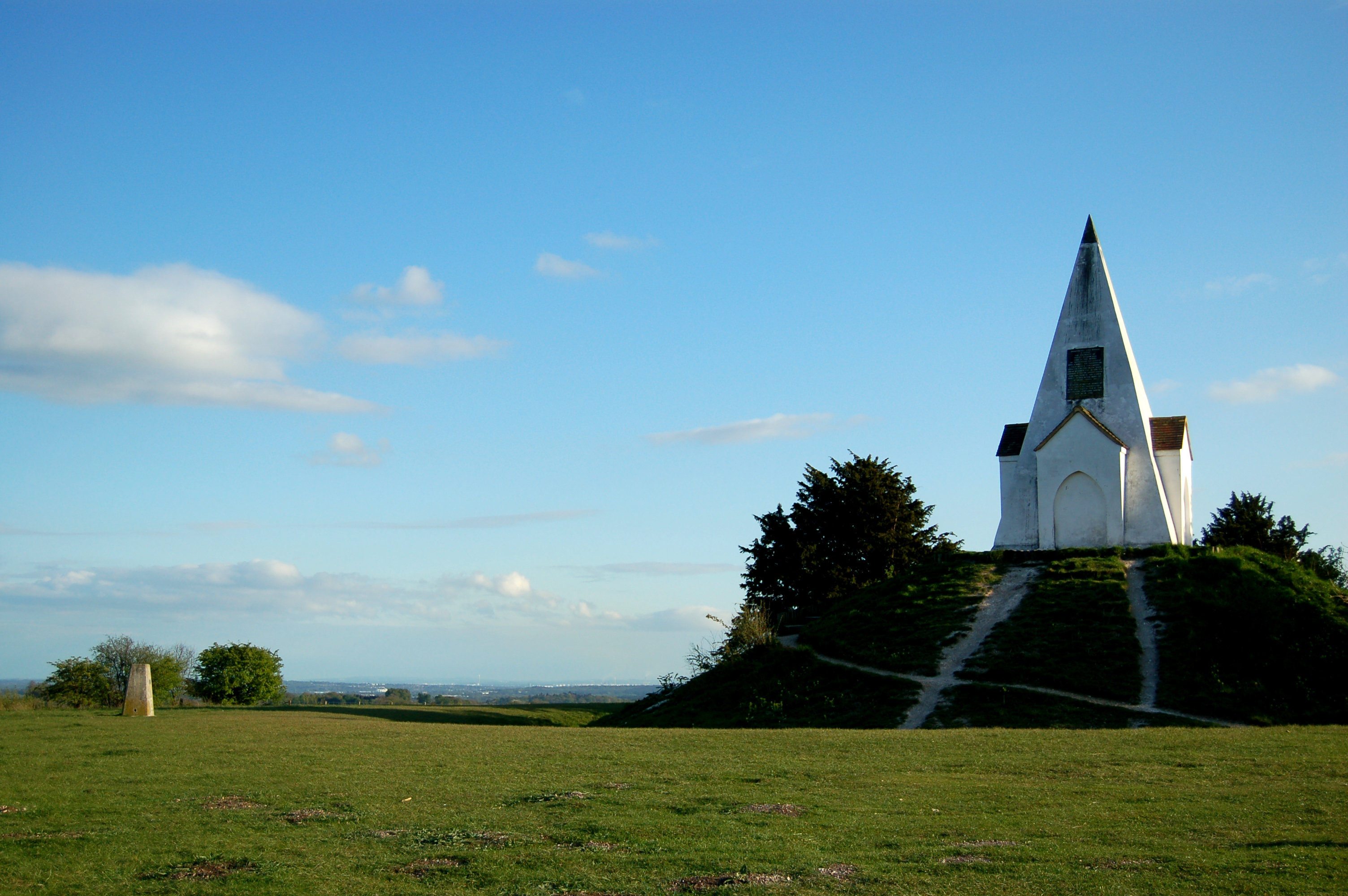

Highest point
- Elevation: 174 m (571 ft)
- Coordinates: 51°03′33″N 1°25′34″W

Geography
- Location within England
- Location: Hampshire, England
- OS grid: SU403290

Farley Mount is a hill in Hampshire that gives its name to Farley Mount Country Park, about four miles west of the city of Winchester. A trig point and an 18th-century monument stand on the summit, 174 metres (571 ft) above sea-level.

== Monument ==
On top of the mount is a folly, which is a monument and burial place marker to a horse named 'Beware Chalk Pit', which carried its owner to a racing victory in 1734, a year after falling into a 25-foot (7.6 m) deep chalk pit while out hunting.

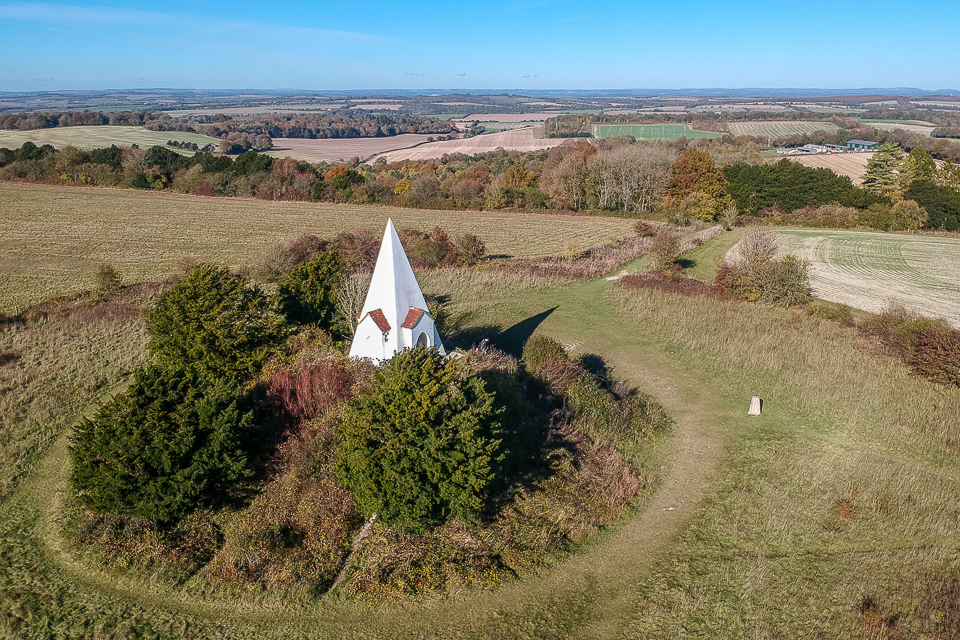
Farley Mount

The monument is the subject of Timothy Corsellis' poem 'the first great goodbye'. Corsellis, an alumnus of Winchester College who lived in the early–mid-20th century, wrote "I'll plant myself on Cheesefoot Head/and miles of Hampshire will I tread,/I'll turn my nose to Farley Mount/No ugly bypass need I count, And in a second I'll be there/ Or in the beech woods standing near".

There are plaques on the interior and exterior of the monument, which read:

Underneath lies buried a horse, the property of Paulet St. John Esq., that in the month of September 1733 leaped into a chalk pit twenty-five feet deep a foxhunting with his master on his back and in October 1734 he won the Hunters Plate on Worthy Downs and was rode by his owner and was entered in the name of "Beware Chalk Pit".

The obelisk is Grade II listed. A short distance to the north-west is a hilltop enclosure, a scheduled monument thought to date from the Iron Age.
