= Wheatham Hill =

Hill in Hampshire, England

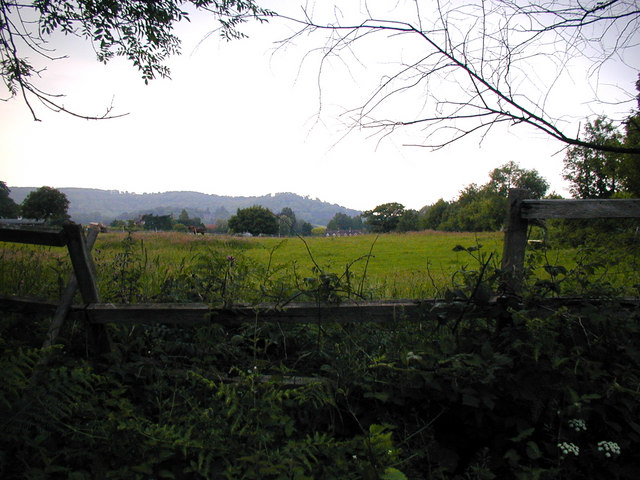
- View across farmland to Steep Farm and Wheatham Hill

Highest point
- Elevation: 249 m (817 ft)
- Prominence: 125 m (410 ft)
- Parent peak: Lewesdon Hill
- Listing: HuMP
- Coordinates: 51.04402°N 0.960055°W

Geography
- Location: Hampshire, England
- Parent range: North Hampshire Downs, East Hampshire Hangers
- OS grid: SU731277
- Topo map: OS Landranger 186, 197; Explorer 133.

At 249 metres (817 ft), Wheatham Hill is one of the highest hills in the county of Hampshire, England. It is part of the North Hampshire Downs.

Much of the hill is covered in mixed forest and there is a trig point at 244 metres, which is also the site of Cobbett's View. According to a nearby information panel:

"The excellent views from this hilltop were first noted in 1822 when William Cobbett rode through here, and subsequently published his "Rural Rides".

'...out we came, all in a moment, at the very edge of the hanger! And never, in all my life, was I so surprised and so delighted! I pulled up my horse, and sat and looked; and it was like looking from the top of a castle down into the sea; except that the valley was land not water'

Until 2010, this viewpoint had been lost for many years under tree growth. Yet an old trig point (triangulation station) remained to indicate that the view had once been visible for OS maps to be surveyed. Countryside Rangers later felled these trees to reveal the views that Cobbett so much admired.

There is a minor track over the summit. It is located in a Special Area of Conservation known as the East Hampshire Hangers.

On the southeastern spur of the hill in the woods is a tumulus, evidence of prehistoric settlement in the area.

Stoner Hill (233 metres (764 ft)) is a subsidiary summit of Wheatham Hill (249 metres (817 ft)).
