= Selborne =

Village and parish in Hampshire, England

Coordinates: 51.097°N 0.942°W

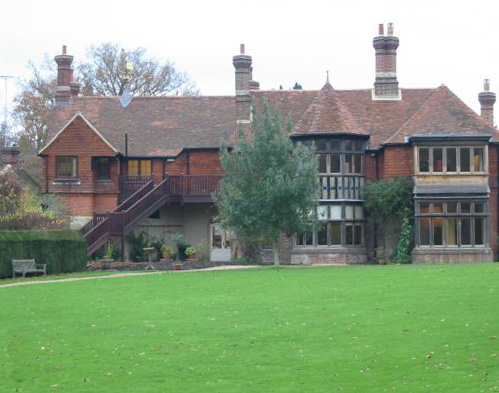
- Gilbert White's house, The Wakes

- Location within Hampshire
- Population: 1,288 (2011 Census including Oakhanger)
- OS grid reference: SU741336
- Civil parish: Selborne
- District: East Hampshire
- Shire county: Hampshire
- Region: South East
- Country: England
- Sovereign state: United Kingdom
- Post town: Alton
- Postcode district: GU34
- Police: Hampshire and Isle of Wight
- Fire: Hampshire and Isle of Wight
- Ambulance: South Central
- UK Parliament: East Hampshire

Selborne is a village in Hampshire, England, 3.9 miles (6.3 km) south of Alton, and just within the northern boundary of the South Downs National Park. The village receives visitors because of its links with the naturalist Revd. Gilbert White, a pioneer of birdwatching.

== The village ==
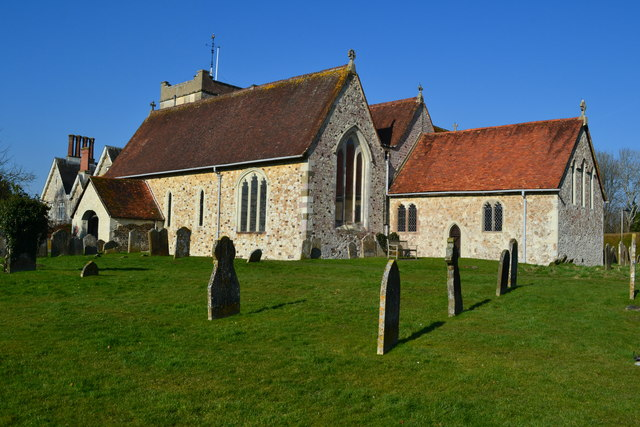
St Mary's Church, Selborne

St Mary the Virgin is a Grade I listed church that dates back to the late 12th century. There is a primary school, and one public house the "Selborne Arms". A bus service that runs through the village links it to Alton and Petersfield.

At the back of the village, behind the Selborne Arms and Gilbert White's Field Studies Centre, there is the Zig-Zag Path, which was cut into the hillside in the 1760s by Gilbert White and his brother John, to provide easier access to the Hanger and Selborne Common on the summit of Selborne Hill.

A complete history of Selborne, from its geology through its establishment as a settlement in the Dark Ages to the present day, including a study of local architecture, was locally published in March 2009: Knights, Priests & Peasants was written by Dr. Edward Yates, a retired academic polymath and long-time resident of the village. Its 400 pages include oral histories from the turn of the 19th/20th centuries.

== Gilbert White ==
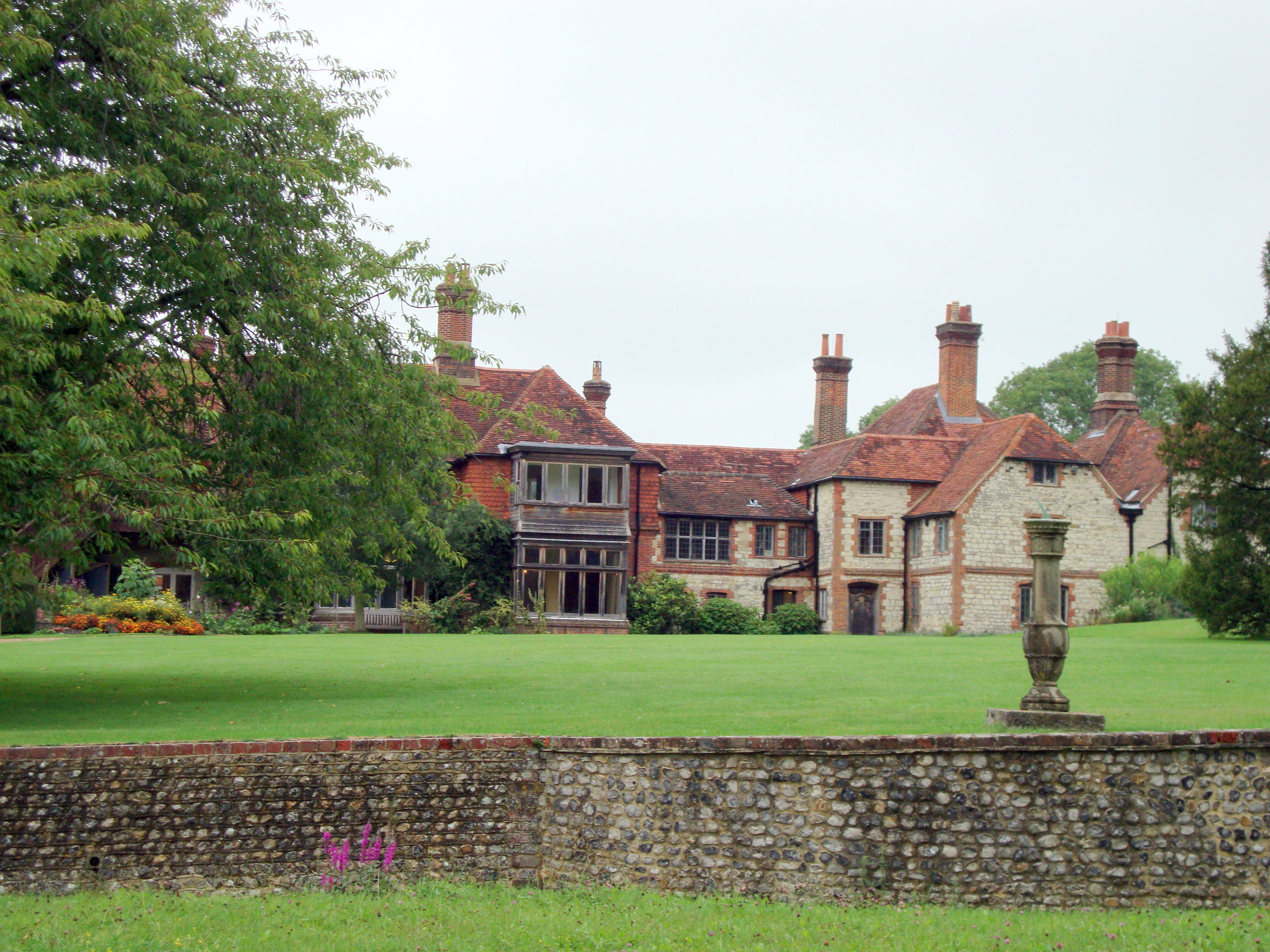
Gilbert White's house, The Wakes, now a museum, viewed from the back gardens in 2010

Selborne is famous for its association with the 18th-century naturalist Gilbert White (1720–1793), who lived at The Wakes and wrote The Natural History and Antiquities of Selborne. Tourism helps to support the local pub, shops and cafes, which the resident population alone would make unviable. Many people combine their visit with one to Jane Austen’s house in nearby Chawton.

First published in 1789 by Benjamin White (Gilbert's brother), the book has not been out of print in over 200 years. White is recognised as being the first ecologist or environmentalist. Most of his observations on wildlife remain pertinent, although he did have some strange theories. Most notorious is his belief that not all swallows, martins and swifts migrate, but that some might hibernate instead, although he mocked the peculiar Swedish notion that swallows spent the winter beneath the surface of the local ponds. White was writing before seasonal migration was fully understood. However, White was the first person to discover that swifts mate on the wing.

The Wakes was subsequently home to Thomas Bell, FRS, who moved there after retirement circa 1862, studied White's work, and edited a new edition of "The Natural History of Selborne".

The 1957 British Transport Films documentary Journey into Spring, directed by Ralph Keene, is a tribute to White and portrays the arrival of spring in Selborne.

=== Museum and Field Studies Centre ===
The Wakes has been converted into a museum, known as Gilbert White's house. This museum also contains the Oates Museum and family archive. This comprises an exhibition relating to the life of Captain Lawrence Oates, who died on Robert Falcon Scott's ill-fated expedition to Antarctica in the early 20th century, and Frank Oates, his uncle. Frank Oates was an explorer and naturalist, who mounted expeditions in the late 19th century into Central America and Africa.

In 2002 the Gilbert White Field Studies Centre moved into new premises, a restored and extended 16th-century Hampshire barn, which had been moved from Weston Patrick near Basingstoke and re-erected in the parkland of Gilbert White's home. This was achieved with financial support from the Heritage Lottery Fund and Hampshire County Council. It was officially opened by Prince Charles on 10 July 2002.

Selborne is still a good base for birdwatching, although White observed some species in the area which are no longer to be found. An example of a bird which disappeared is the great bustard, which became extinct in Britain in the 19th century but is now the subject of a reintroduction project.

The Wakes was substantially refurbished and updated in 2003–04. The costs of £1.3m were covered by a combination of personal, institutional and charity grants amounting to 50% of the total, matched by a grant from the National Lottery Heritage Fund. It is open throughout the year, attracting an annual average of 30,000 visitors. The Museum and Field Study Centre is a registered charity.

== Notable former and current residents ==
- Gilbert White
- Thomas Bell (zoologist)
- Marika Hackman Musician, grew up in Selborne

== Local business ==
Selborne Pottery, established in 1985, manufactures and sells a range of hand thrown and decorated stoneware pottery using rich copper red and cobalt blue glazes. Each piece of pottery is hand thrown and turned on a wheel; no industrial techniques or moulds are used in the making process. The pottery has a shop in the village.

Selborne Biological Services, formed in 1974 on a 100-acre (0.40 km^{2}) farm in Selborne, makes animal-derived products for the biotech, pharmaceutical, veterinary, and diagnostics industries. They moved their main production facilities to Tasmania in 1992 following the BSE outbreak in the UK in the late 1980s, but maintain a European sales, marketing and distribution centre in Selborne.

=== Former businesses ===
Tower Brick & Tile Company Limited produced handmade Selborne bricks and roof tiles at their site near Selborne from 1872 until the company went into administration in 2009.

Selborne Gallery was the only art gallery in Britain devoted entirely to the work of mouth and foot painting artists. Formed in 1992, it was visited by Prince Charles on its tenth anniversary in 2002. The displayed work included painting, printmaking, drawing, textiles, ceramics, glass and jewellery.

== Transport ==
The village is on the B3006; and is served by the 38 and 37X bus routes. The nearest railway station is Alton, 3.9 miles (6.3 km) north of the village. Liss is a little further away to the east, with frequent trains on the Portsmouth-Waterloo line.

== See also ==
- Plestor House
- Selborne Common
- Selborne Priory
- Earl of Selborne
- The Natural History and Antiquities of Selborne
- Woolmer Forest
