= Hampshire Downs =

Area of downland in southern England, United Kingdom

Coordinates: 51.14°N 1.24°W

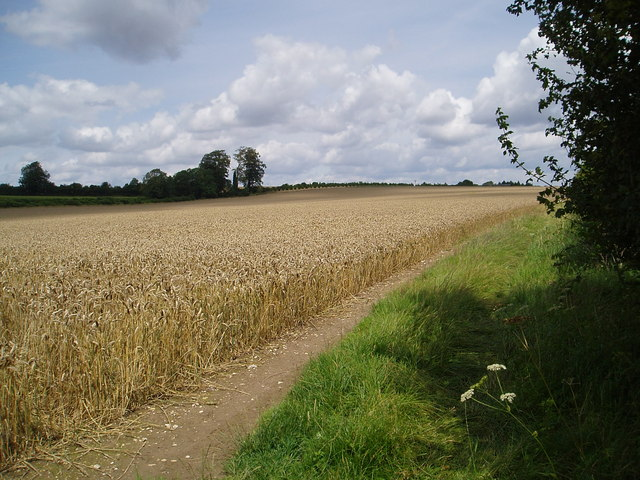
The Hampshire Downs are one of the breadbaskets of Southern England; here wheat is growing on the free-draining chalk downs above Alresford.

The Hampshire Downs form a large area of downland in central southern England, mainly in the county of Hampshire, but extending into Berkshire and Wiltshire. They are part of a belt of chalk downlands that runs from the South Downs in the southeast, north to the Berkshire and Marlborough Downs, and west to the Dorset Downs.

The downs have been designated a National Character Area (NCA 130) by Natural England, the UK Government's advisor on the natural environment. To the north lie the Thames Basin Heaths, to the east the Low Weald (Western Weald), to the south the South Hampshire Lowlands and the South Downs, and, to the west, Salisbury Plain and the West Wiltshire Downs.

The northern boundary of the Hampshire Downs follows a line from just north of Walbury Hill in Berkshire to Basingstoke and Farnham, forming a ridge and dramatic escarpment which rises to over 290 metres, overlooking the Thames Basin. In the east the boundary runs from Farnham to Alton, then swings southwards to Petersfield, forming an escarpment at the western edge of the Weald, including an area known as the East Hampshire Hangers. In the south the boundary runs westwards to Winchester, south to Twyford and Otterbourne, then west-northwest to Michelmersh; and in the west from Michelmersh through the Wallops to Ludgershall in Wiltshire, and back to Walbury Hill.

The main rivers of the Hampshire Downs are the Test and River Itchen. The main settlements in the area are Andover, Alton, Basingstoke and Winchester.

20% of the area (the North Hampshire Downs) falls within the North Wessex Downs AONB, and around 6% within the South Downs National Park.

== Highest hills ==
Walbury Hill is the highest point on the Hampshire Downs, although it lies in the county of Berkshire. Pilot Hill is the highest point on Hampshire's section of the Downs and is Hampshire's county top. Prominent hills in the Hampshire Downs include:

- Walbury Hill (297 m)
- Combe Hill (293 m)
- Inkpen Hill (289 m)
- Pilot Hill (286 m)
- Sidown Hill (266 m)
- Beacon Hill (261 m)
- Wheatham Hill (249 m)
- Watership Down (237 m)
- Ladle Hill (232 m)
- Holybourne Hill (225 m)
- Red Hill (221 m)
- Goleigh Hill (220 m)
- King's Hill (218 m)
- Noar Hill (214 m)
- Selborne Hill (211 m)
- Farleigh Hill (208 m)
- Farley Mount (178 m)
- St Catherine's Hill (97 m)
