= Butser Hill =

Nature reserve in Hampshire, England

- Site of Special Scientific Interest
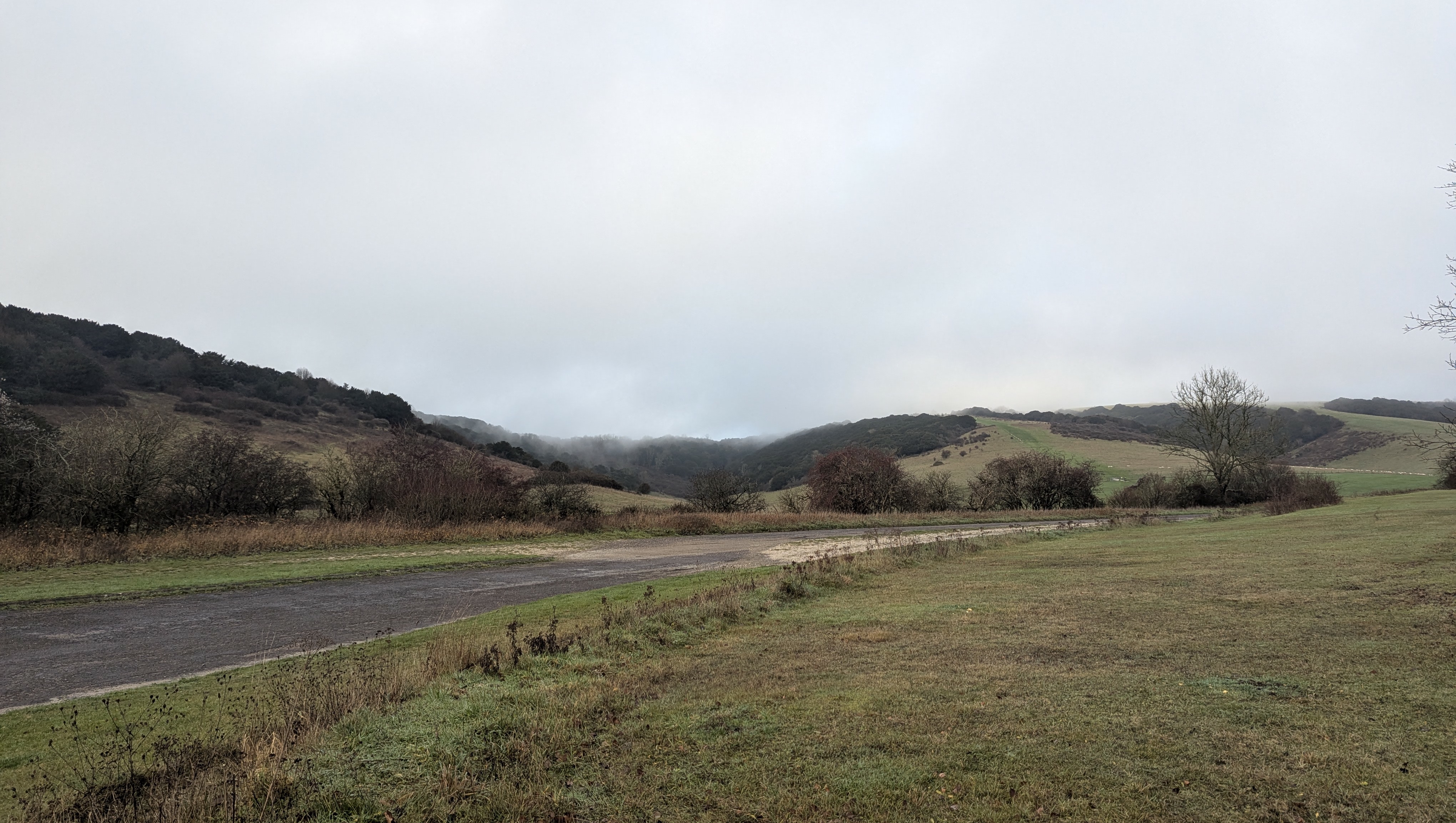
- Location of Butser Hill.
- Area of search: Hampshire
- Grid reference: SU 714 199
- Interest: Biological; Geological
- Area: 239.7 hectares (592 acres)
- Notification date: 1984
- Location map: Magic Map

Butser Hill
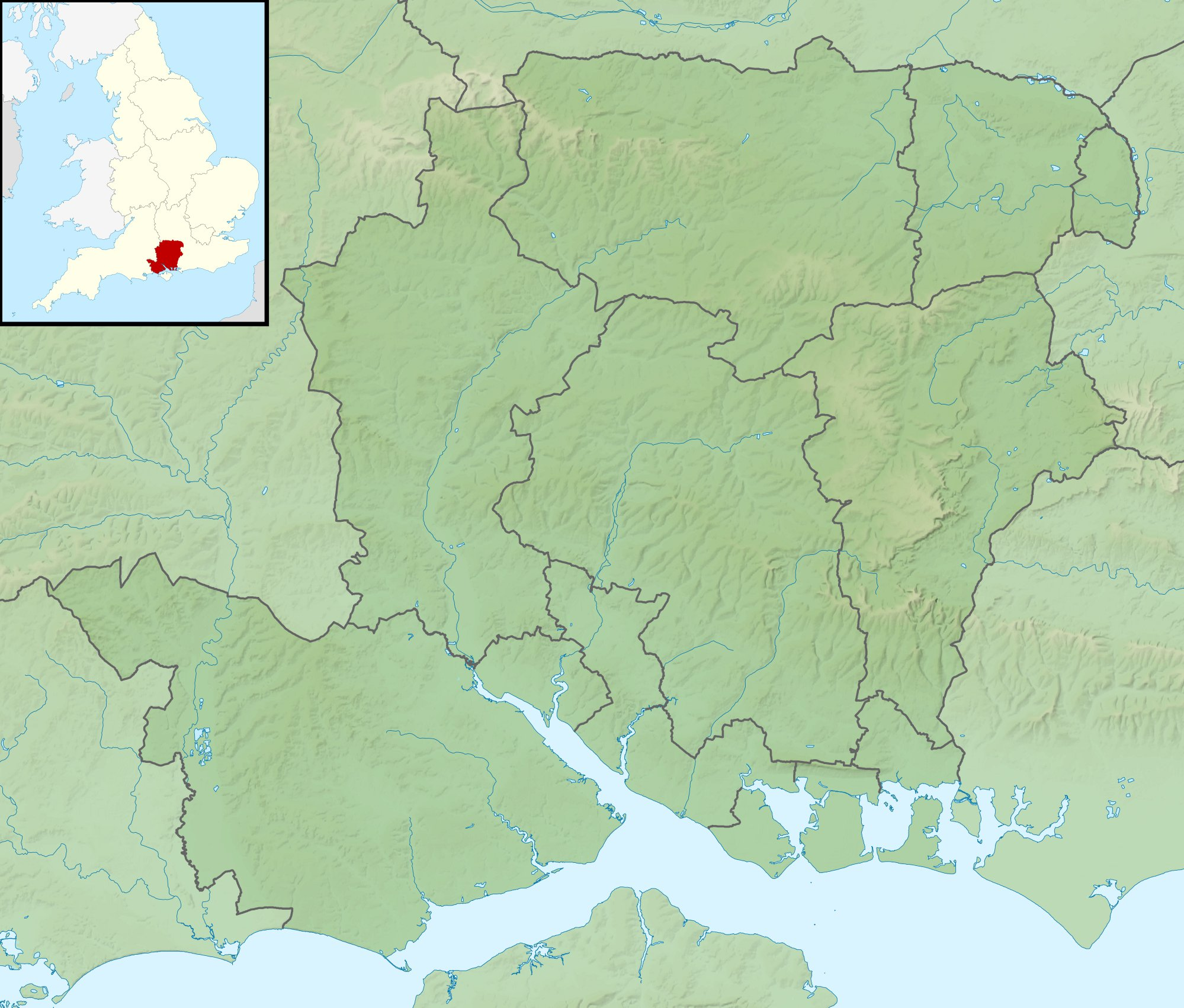
- Location within Hampshire

Highest point
- Elevation: 271 m (889 ft)
- Prominence: 158 m (518 ft)
- Parent peak: Walbury Hill
- Listing: Marilyn, Hardy
- Coordinates: 50°58′40″N 0°58′53″W

Geography
- Location: South Downs, England
- OS grid: SU716203
- Topo map: OS Landranger 197

Butser Hill is a hill and nature reserve in Hampshire, England. South-west of Petersfield, it is a 239.7-hectare (592-acre) biological and geological Site of Special Scientific Interest. It is a National Nature Reserve and a Special Area of Conservation. Part of it is a Geological Conservation Review site and an area of 84.8 hectares (210 acres), Oxenbourne Down, is designated a Local Nature Reserve. Part of it is a Scheduled Monument.

It is a chalk hill and one of the highest points in Hampshire. It is also the highest point on the chalk ridge of the South Downs and the second-highest point in the South Downs National Park after Blackdown in the Western Weald. Although only 271 metres (889 ft) high, it qualifies as one of England's Marilyns. It is located within the borders of the Queen Elizabeth Country Park.

The name Butser comes from the Old English Bryttes Oran meaning "Briht's slope". Oran or Ora is Old English for a flat-topped hill and/or steep slope. The flat summit is surrounded by a number of spurs. Iron Age ditches and banks divide the spurs from the summit although the purpose of these earthworks is unclear. There is evidence of lynchet farming on the southeast side of the hill. The age of the lynchets is unknown but Roman pottery has been brought to the surface by rabbit holes.

There are aerial masts on the hill.

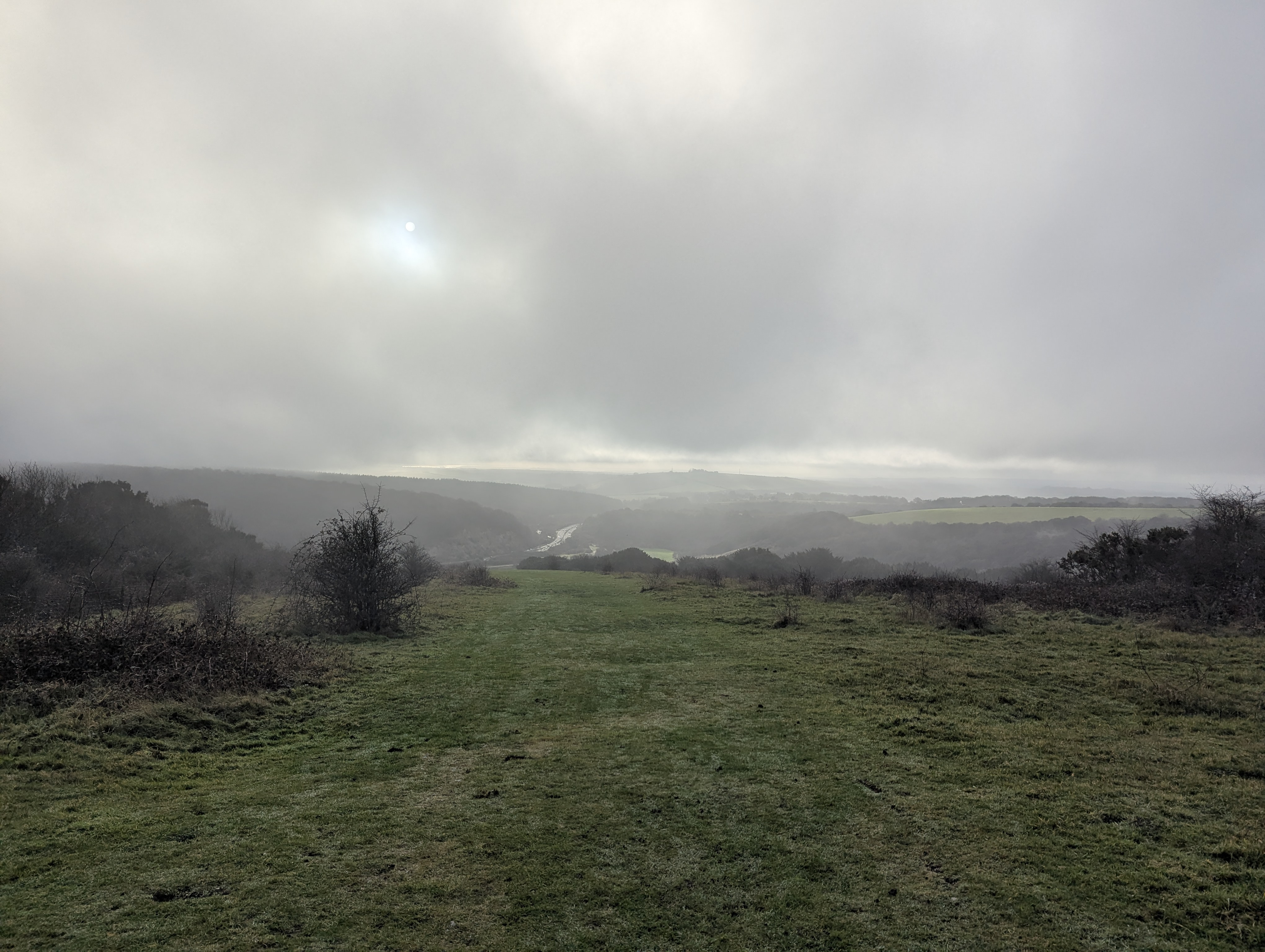
The view down the hill near the peak

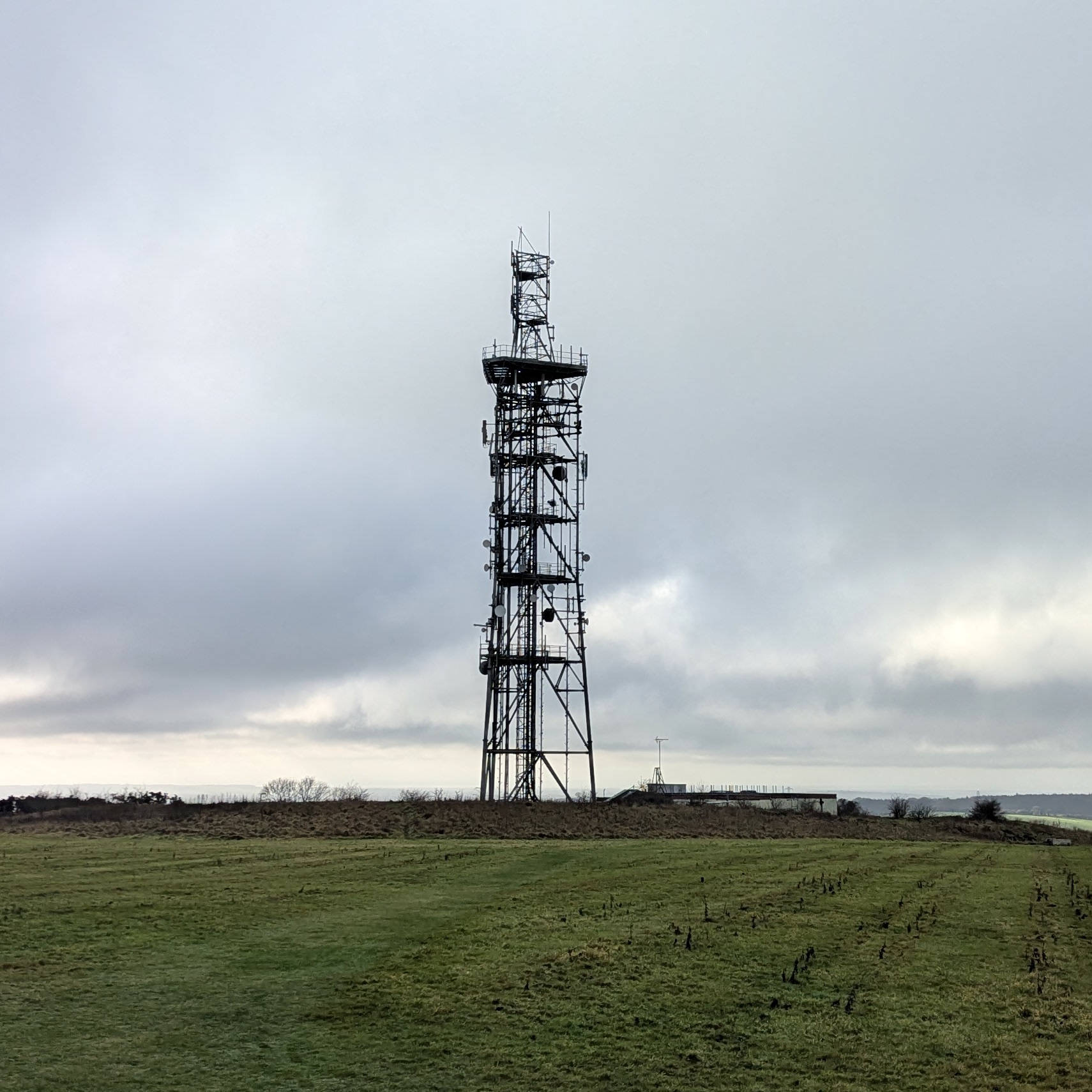
BT Tower at the peak of Butser Hill

The hill was purchased by Hampshire County Council in 1966. Before the purchase the summit was used for growing wheat, but now the only farming activity is grazing. In December 2021 a £240,000 program was announced to restore grassland on the hill and improve trails.

Butser Hill has a rich variety of flora and fauna. It is an important area for butterfly conservation, with more than 30 species of butterfly recorded including populations of Duke of Burgundy and the Silver-spotted Skipper.

An annual Fell Run called the Butser Hill Challenge involves running up and down the hill three times.

== Miscellaneous ==
A spur of Butser Hill known as Little Butser was the original home of the Butser Ancient Farm experimental archaeology project.

Butser Hill has been a primary hang-gliding site since the early 1970s.

Part of the 1986 Only Fools and Horses episode "Tea for Three" was filmed at Butser Hill.

== See also ==
- Butser Ancient Farm
