= Hockley (disambiguation) =

Hockley is a village in Essex, England.

Hockley may also refer to:

== Places ==
- In England:
  - Hockley, Cheshire, a location
  - Hockley, Kent, a location
  - Hockley, Nottingham, an area of Nottingham City Centre, Nottinghamshire
  - Hockley, Solihull, West Midlands, on the border of Coventry
  - Hockley, Staffordshire, an area of Tamworth, see location
  - Hockley, Tendring, part of Frating, Essex
  - Hockley, West Midlands, an inner suburb of Birmingham, West Midlands
  - Hockley-in-the-Hole, London
  - Hockley Heath, West Midlands
  - Hockley Railway Viaduct, near Twyford, Hampshire
- In the United States:
  - Hockley (Gloucester, Virginia), an estate listed on the U.S. National Register of Historic Places
  - Hockley, Texas, Harris County, USA
  - Hockley, Virginia (disambiguation), several places
  - Hockley-in-the-Hole, Maryland, a historic site in Anne Arundel County, Maryland
  - Hockley County, Texas, USA
- In Canada:
  - Hockley, Ontario

== Other uses ==
- Hockley (surname)
