= Farrar-Hockley =

The name Farrar-Hockley may refer to:

- Sir Anthony Farrar-Hockley (1924–2006), British full general and military historian
- Dair Farrar-Hockley (b. 1946), British major-general and son of Anthony Farrar-Hockley

== See also ==
- Farrar (surname)
- Hockley (disambiguation)
