= Didcot, Newbury and Southampton Railway =

Former British cross-country railway

Overview
- Status: Disused
- Termini: Didcot; Winchester (Chesil)
- Stations: 17

Service
- Type: Heavy rail
- Operator(s): Great Western Railway; Western Region of British Railways

History
- Opened: 1882
- Closed: 1962 (passengers); 1964 (goods)

Technical
- Line length: 46 mi (74 km)
- Number of tracks: Single and double track
- Track gauge: 4 ft 8 1/2 in (1,435 mm) standard gauge

The Didcot, Newbury and Southampton Railway (DN&SR) was a cross-country railway running north–south between Didcot, Newbury and Winchester. Its promoters intended an independent route to Southampton and envisaged heavy traffic from the Midlands and North of England to the port, but they ran out of funds to complete the line to Southampton. The intended heavy through traffic never materialised, and the line was dependent on larger railways—the Great Western Railway and the London and South Western Railway—for support, which was not freely given. The line opened in two stages, in 1882 and 1885.

The company was absorbed by the Great Western Railway in 1923 following the Railways Act 1921. It became strategically important during World War II when huge volumes of munitions and troops were transported to South Coast ports, particularly in the preparations for the Normandy landings, and the Didcot to Newbury section was doubled, while the southern section was upgraded with extended passing loops.

The line never carried heavy passenger volumes and declining traffic led to its closure in stages from 1960 to 1964.

== History ==
The DN&SR was authorised in 1873 and became part of a series of 'railway wars' in the south of England between the Great Western Railway (GWR) and the London and South Western Railway (LSWR).

=== First proposals ===
The idea for a railway running north to south through Hampshire stemmed from a proposal for the Manchester and Southampton Railway during the Railway Mania of the 1840s. It failed to gain approval by Parliament, largely because of opposition from the Great Western Railway.

The idea of a direct line linking the manufacturing districts and the South Coast soon inspired another scheme, the Oxford, Southampton, Gosport and Portsmouth Railway, which was generally known as "Bethell's Line" after John Bethell, a solicitor, who was the principal spokesman for the promoters. It failed to gain approval in Parliament in May 1846. It was intended as a connecting line, but the promoters offered no explanation of how the break of gauge would be dealt with.

Didcot, Newbury, and Southampton Junction Railway Act 1873
- Act of Parliament
- Parliament of the United Kingdom
- Long title: An Act for making a Railway in Berkshire and Hampshire, to be called the Didcot, Newbury, and Southampton Junction Railway.
- Citation: 36 & 37 Vict. c. ccxxix

Dates
- Royal assent: 5 August 1873

The earlier plans never progressed, but the idea of a railway linking the industrial areas of the Midlands was revived in the 1870s, when the growth of the railway network meant that main lines from the north reached Southampton via Oxford, Reading and Basingstoke. This was an indirect and complex route, and in 1873 a bill was submitted to Parliament for the construction of the Didcot, Newbury and Southampton Junction Railway. The company was incorporated by the Didcot, Newbury, and Southampton Junction Railway Act 1873 (36 & 37 Vict. c. ccxxix) of 5 August 1873, to build a 34-mile (55 km) line from Didcot on the Great Western Main Line to a point 2 miles (3 km) north of Micheldever on the South West Main Line, whence access to Southampton was to be over the LSWR line. There was to be a branch from Compton to East Ilsley and a loop at Whitchurch to join the Basingstoke and Salisbury line of the LSWR. This line was to cross the GWR Berks and Hants Extension line at Newbury without making a junction there, as that line was still broad gauge at that time.

Didcot, Newbury and Southampton Junction Railway Act 1880
- Act of Parliament
- Parliament of the United Kingdom
- Long title: An Act for granting further Powers to the Didcot, Newbury, and Southampton Junction Railway Company; and for other purposes.
- Citation: 43 & 44 Vict. c. xlvii

Dates
- Royal assent: 9 July 1880

Text of statute as originally enacted

By 1878 the company was on the verge of abandonment—a bill was submitted to Parliament for the purpose—and "with no vestige of any financial support", but due to the exertions of Lord Carnarvon, a revised route was planned, connecting with the GWR at Newbury and running through the GWR station there; and forming the Micheldever junction nearer to that station together with a second spur at Whitchurch. These changes were authorised by the Didcot, Newbury and Southampton Junction Railway Act 1880 (43 & 44 Vict. c. xlvii) of 9 July 1880, but Carnarvon's energy had already led to the first sod being cut on the Didcot to Newbury section on 26 August 1879.

=== Partial opening, and further authorisations ===
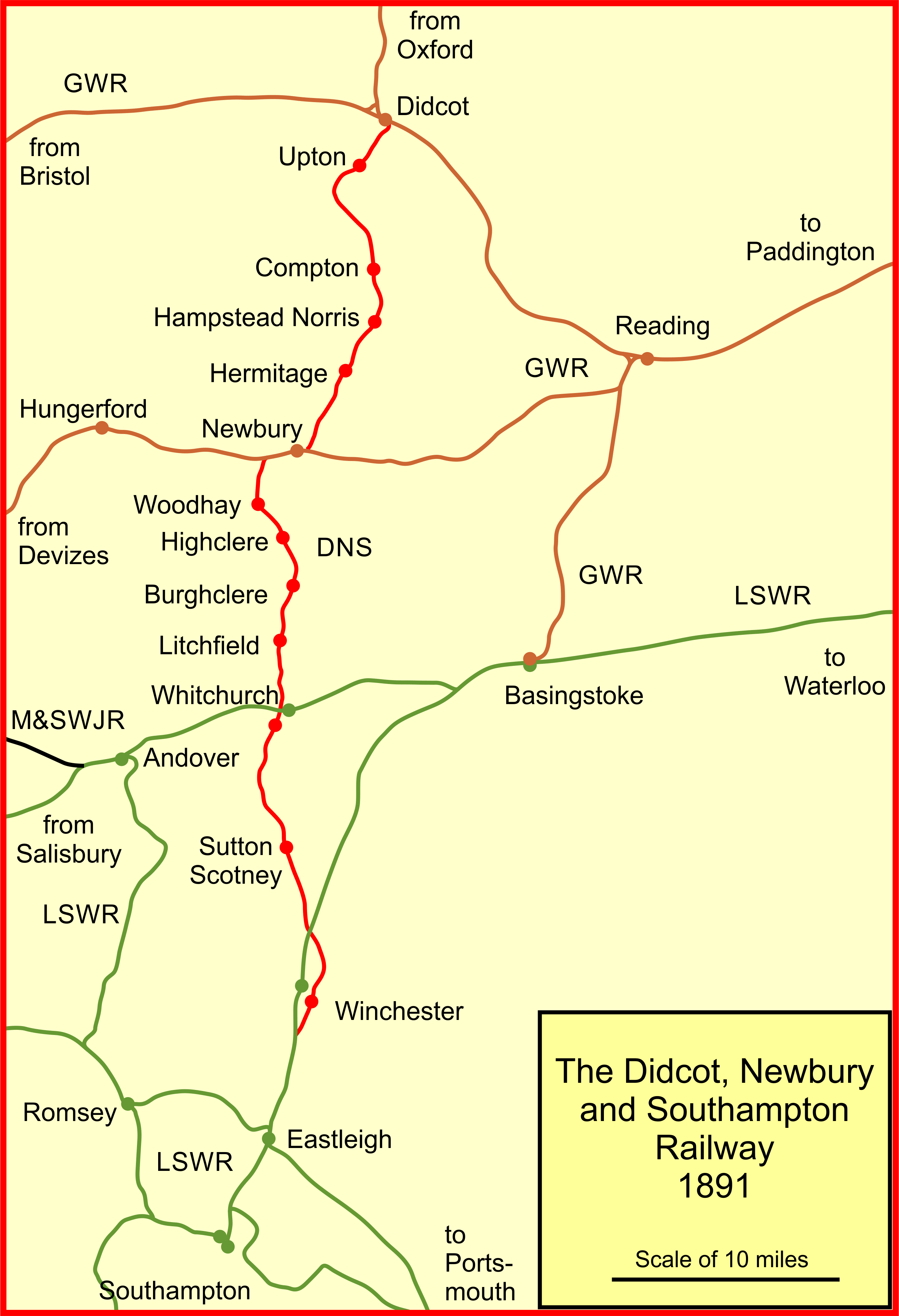
Map of Didcot Newbury and Southampton Railway system in 1891

The Didcot to Newbury section proceeded rapidly, and was opened to traffic on 12 April 1882. (Note: Mitchell and Robertson say 13 April 1882.) It had junctions with the GWR at both places and used the GWR stations, and the GWR worked the line. Now with energetic plans, the company sought authority for its own line to Southampton, 33 1/2 miles (53.9 km) in length, to a location near to the Royal Pier there from Burghclere.

Didcot, Newbury and Southampton Junction Railway Act 1882
- Act of Parliament
- Parliament of the United Kingdom
- Long title: An Act to confer further powers on the Didcot Newbury and Southampton Junction Railway Company; to enable them to extend their Railway to Southampton and Aldermaston; and for other purposes.
- Citation: 45 & 46 Vict. c. cxcvii

Dates
- Royal assent: 10 August 1882

Text of statute as originally enacted

There was to be a station at Bargate, Southampton, and a 10 1/2-mile (16.9 km) line from Burghclere to Aldermaston on the GWR, but the Micheldever line and the Whitchurch loops were to be abandoned. All this was authorised by the Didcot, Newbury and Southampton Junction Railway Act 1882 (45 & 46 Vict. c. cxcvii) of 10 August 1882. The planned railway would run across largely empty country between Newbury and Winchester before running down the eastern side of the Itchen Valley, closely paralleling the LSWR's main line on the western side, before crossing the LSWR rails on an overbridge just north of the boundary of the future site of the Eastleigh Works at Allbrook, then winding around the high ground north of Southampton to approach the city from the west to run into new terminus at Bargate (the planned station site is now occupied by the Westquay shopping centre) and there was authorisation for a line to run 0.42-mile (0.68 km) south of this station to the Royal Pier, where steamers for the Isle of Wight and Cherbourg departed. The DN&S was proposed as a shortcut to the coast, saving 6 miles (10 km) compared to the existing route through Reading.

Deposited plans held by Hampshire record office show that the route south from Winchester was planned to run to the East of Twyford, Allbrook (where it was shown to cross the LSWR main line at Allbrook Lock by an overbridge), Chandler's Ford (crossing the LSWR Salisbury line to the west of Oakmount Road), pass under the current Leigh Road–Bournemouth Road junction, climb to a tunnel near the current Chilworth Arms Public House, descend through Lordswood and the current Sports Centre area to traverse the east side of Dale Valley, swing south east under the current Winchester Road, pass through the site now occupied by Shirley Junior School, run to the south west of the current Wilton Road before crossing to the east side of Hill Lane and heading south towards the intended bridge over the LSWR. This final stretch is the area in which work commenced and the location of the surviving embankment, part of the land upon which preparatory clearance and culvert work was undertaken later became The Dell football ground between Archers Road and Milton Road north of the unused embankment. The main passenger station was to be at Bargate Street, reached by a bridge over the LSWR Southampton to Dorchester railway, and this area was to be widened throughout its length with considerable reclamation work and a sea wall built alongside Southampton Central station (at this time the LSWR Southampton West station was somewhat east of the present Central station position).

Intermediate stations were to have been provided on the route and a story grew up that the St James' Park, Southampton site in Shirley was excavated for this purpose, often repeated in local books. Deposited plans, however, show the park site already existed within the surrounding road layout and was not part of the planned route, which ran to the north east of St James' Church; its current sunken appearance was caused by later gravel extraction. Archival research by the Shirley Local History Group, notably among the records of a local landowner revealed that a later revival of this scheme, the Southampton and Winchester Great Western Junction Railway, intended to use the park as the original route at this location had by then been developed. Plans and sections dated 1901 show the intended route of the railway as passing through the park from East to West. Records indicated that property sales were discussed for this scheme, which would have followed a slightly different route to the previous scheme in some areas without a tunnel at Chilworth. South of St James's Park at this time Didcot, Newbury and Station (now Stratton) Roads were named. Station Road also contained a police station. The only physical remnant of the project in Southampton is the tree covered embankment hidden behind current properties east of Hill Lane between Milton Road and Commercial Road. The deposited plans for the route through Southampton and current land levels suggest this was also the location of the viaduct work described by Sands. A photograph described as illustrating the part built viaduct from the London and South Western Railway appears in both the book An Illustrated History of the Didcot, Newbury and Southampton Railway and in a detailed article about the Didcot Newbury and Southampton Railway in Southampton in the Hampshire Industrial Archaeology Society Journal, No. 26 (2018).

Didcot, Newbury, and Southampton Railway Act 1883
- Act of Parliament
- Parliament of the United Kingdom
- Long title: An Act to consolidate the Capital of the Didcot Newbury and Southampton Junction Railway Company; to change the Name of the Company; and for other purposes.
- Citation: 46 & 47 Vict. c. cxxix

Dates
- Royal assent: 16 July 1883

The Aldermaston branch and the independent line to Southampton were never built, and an act of Parliament authorising yet further modifications, the Didcot, Newbury, and Southampton Railway Act 1883 (46 & 47 Vict. c. cxxix) also changed the name of the company; the word "junction" was dropped and it was now the Didcot, Newbury and Southampton Railway (DN&SR). In an echo of the early plans to join the LSWR's West of England line at Whitchurch a west-to-north junction was made here, requiring a steeply-graded embankment descending from the higher-level LSWR line, but this was only to permit construction materials, equipment and spoil to be more easily moved in and out of the works – once the DN&SR was completed the link was removed and the two companies maintained entirely separate Whitchurch stations, with the D&SNR passing under the LSWR just west of the latter's station, with the former's station being 0.65 miles (1.05 km) to the south and nearer the village it served. The LSWR was wary of the DN&SR's scheme, and especially this southward extension which threatened to break its monopoly on rail traffic in central Hampshire and at the port of Southampton. Shortly after the northern section of the DN&SR opened the LSWR obtained an act of Parliament to build a 7 1/2-mile (12.1 km) north–south railway between its Sprat and Winkle Line and the West of England line. This short section of high-quality double-track railway, which became known simply as the Fullerton to Hurstbourne Line was intended as a compromise between the LSWR and the DN&SR, with the former hoping to tempt the latter into building its line, then under construction from Newbury, to Hurstbourne and then proceeding to Southampton on existing LSWR metals. The DN&SR did not take up this offer and continued building its independent route towards Winchester, where the firm's funds were exhausted and construction was brought to what was hoped to be a temporary stop. The LSWR opened the (now mostly redundant) Fullerton–Hurstbourne Line eight weeks after the DN&SR opened its section between Newbury and Winchester, with its own station at Winchester Cheesehill.

This opened on 4 May 1885, after a ceremonial inauguration three days previously. The Winchester station was reached by a bored tunnel under The Soke; it was on a cramped site adjacent to St Giles' Hill. It appears that the line was built as far as Bar End, where the goods facilities for Winchester were provided. (Note: Sands states on page 20 that "The Shawford Junction line required the building of 1 1/2 miles of new railway, half of which followed the course of the Southampton extension from the point already reached at Bar End, Winchester", but this may refer to the formation only, not necessarily to an operational railway line.)

=== Worked by the Great Western Railway ===
The Didcot, Newbury and Southampton Railway Company lacked the resources to operate its line, and it arranged for the Great Western Railway to work the new line, providing rolling stock and traincrews. At this time there was intense competitive rivalry between the GWR and the LSWR. In 1876 the Somerset and Dorset Railway had leased its line to the Midland Railway and the LSWR jointly, giving independent access from the Midlands and the North of England to the South Coast. The GWR was alarmed at this loss of primacy in the traffic, and it was pleased to undertake the working of the Didcot, Newbury and Southampton Railway (DN&SR) line, which it hoped would give it access to Southampton, in LSWR territory.

=== Reaching Southampton at last ===
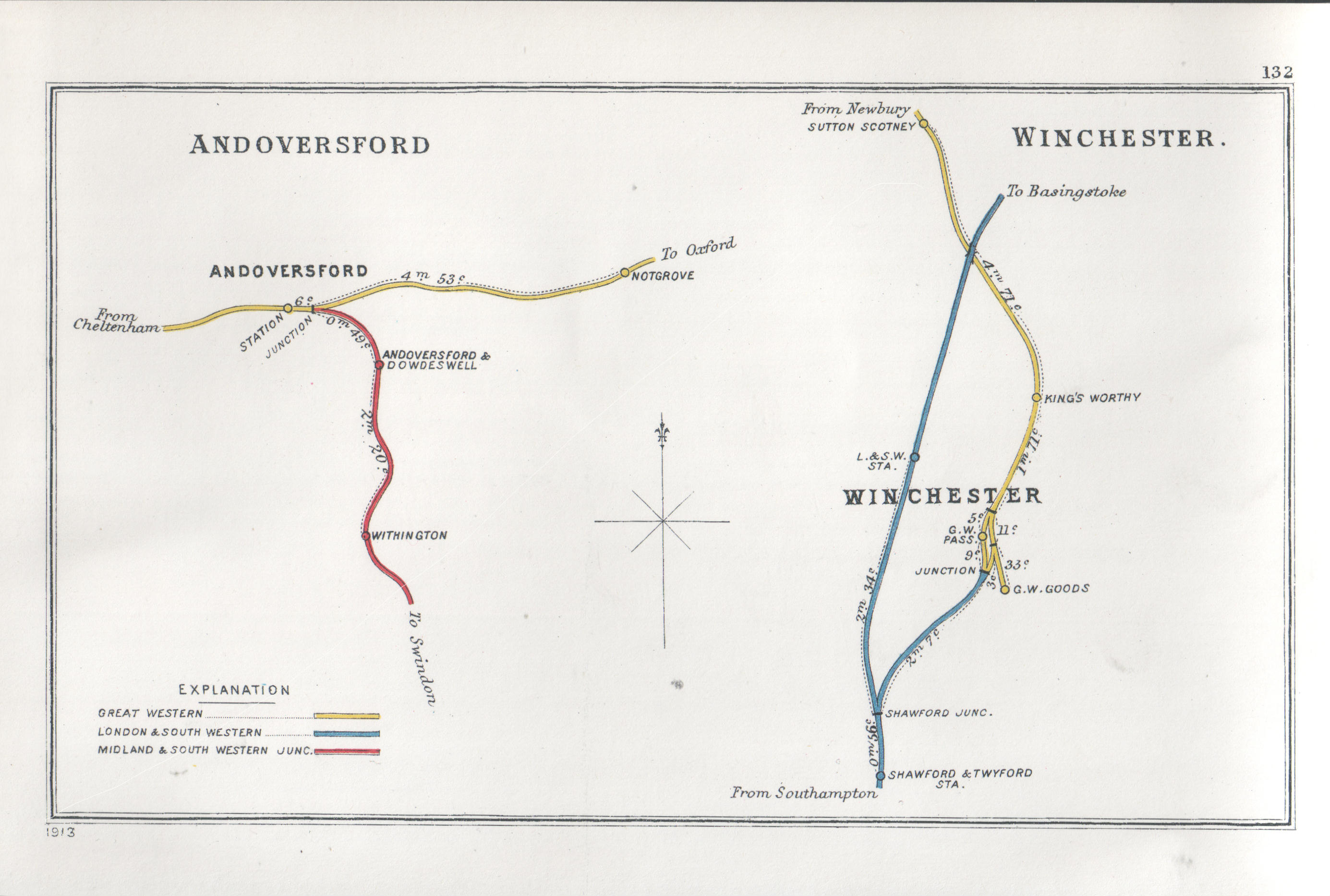
A 1913 Railway Clearing House map showing (right) railways in the vicinity of Winchester. The DN&SR is shown in yellow and the LSWR in blue.

The company had expended all its financial resources in building the line, but its southern terminus was in Winchester: a cathedral city but not the commercial centre that had been planned. Without a through-line to Southampton the DN&SR would not be able to attract the long-distance traffic that would restore in finances, but without that traffic it could not raise the funds needed to complete the final section of its planned route south of Winchester. In June 1885 the company estimated that it required £100,000 to complete the line into Southampton, and Winchester and Southampton councils invested £15,000 and £70,000 respectively.

The intended works at Southampton were considerable: £100,000 had already been expended, much of it on land acquisition. Sands, writing in 1971, said

The D.N.&S. had bought a wide belt of land stretching from Wyndham place, outside the present Southampton Central station, northwards along the east side of Hill Lane for about 1/2 mile, then north-westward for nearly a mile towards St. James's church in Upper Shirley ... Actual work seems to have been confined to the Hill Lane area where ... a viaduct was required ... The viaduct was completed for over half its length ... The unfinished viaduct has [since] vanished.

Didcot, Newbury and Southampton Railway Act 1888
- Act of Parliament
- Parliament of the United Kingdom
- Long title: An Act to confer further powers on the Didcot Newbury and Southampton Railway Company and for other purposes.
- Citation: 51 & 52 Vict. c. cxlvii

Dates
- Royal assent: 7 August 1888

Text of statute as originally enacted

Didcot, Newbury and Southampton Railway Act 1889
- Act of Parliament
- Parliament of the United Kingdom
- Long title: An Act to enable the Didcot Newbury and Southampton Railway Company to abandon certain portions of their authorised Railways and for other purposes.
- Citation: 52 & 53 Vict. c. cii

Dates
- Royal assent: 26 July 1889

Text of statute as originally enacted

The only way out was an accommodation with the LSWR; under this agreement the company built a short connecting line from its Winchester station to Shawford Junction on the LSWR; this was authorised by the Didcot, Newbury and Southampton Railway Act 1888 (51 & 52 Vict. c. cxlvii) and the Didcot, Newbury and Southampton Railway Act 1889 (52 & 53 Vict. c. cii) and opened on 1 October 1891. The LSWR now had its long-sought for control over DN&SR traffic in its own territory and agreed to the Shawford link out of concern that the GWR would provide the final funding to complete the independent line. Furthermore, seeing the danger of admitting DN&SR trains worked by GWR locomotives into Southampton, the LSWR agreed to the connection on condition that their own engines took over at Winchester and worked DN&SR trains on to Southampton from there, over its own line onward from Shawford Junction. For the time being GWR engines were forbidden to work south of Winchester, and there was always an engine change in the cramped station there until a pooling agreement finalised in 1910 removed this restriction.

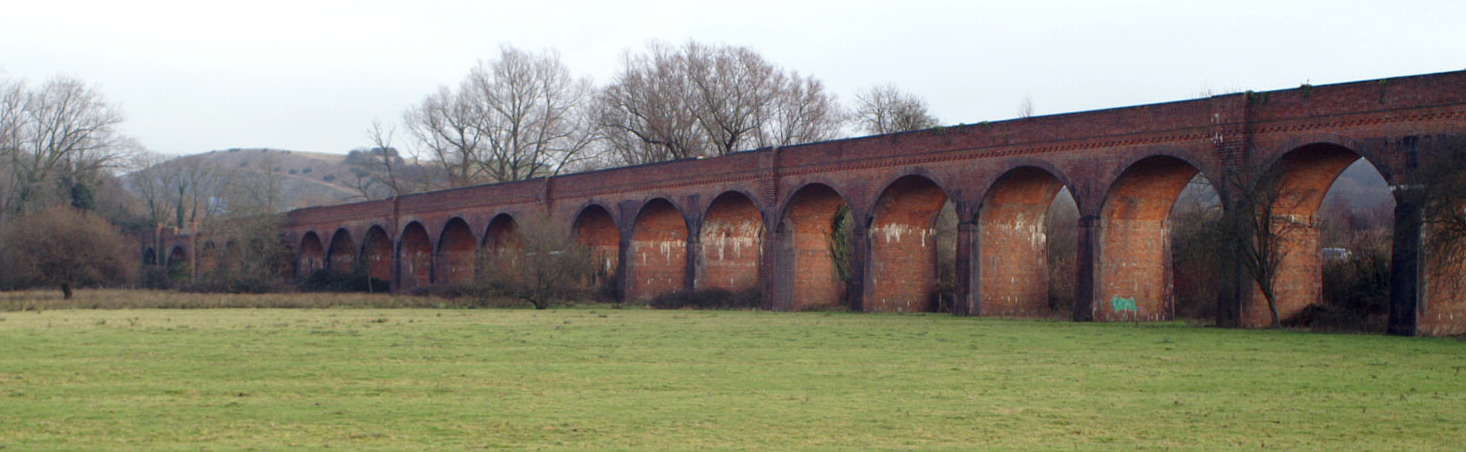
Part of Hockley Viaduct in 2005

This line, running over the Hockley viaduct, was completed in 1891, and services from Didcot to Southampton began shortly after. The DN&SR joined the LSWR line at Shawford Junction, north of Shawford station.

Parts of land in Southampton itself already purchased by the DN&SR (including the part built viaduct) for the final link were then subsequently sold off.

The LSWR advanced a loan of £16,000 for the construction of the extension from Winchester to Shawford Junction was built. This became due for repayment on 1 January 1900, and the DN&SR clearly had no resources to repay the money: in fact it was paid off with interest by Lord Wantage. Robertson says that this money was actually advanced confidentially by the GWR, no doubt to forestall any attempt by the LSWR to take over the line and gain access to Didcot.

=== Newbury station ===
Prior to the construction of the DN&SR line, Newbury had had a simple two-platform through station. The DN&SR trains now ran through the station and passenger trains made calls there. When the GWR completed its development of the cut-off route to the West of England from 1900 it diverted most of its Devon and Cornwall traffic via Newbury. Much of the Weymouth traffic had earlier been transferred to the route from the Melksham line. The GWR reconstructed Newbury station, providing through lines independent of the passenger platforms, and an enlarged goods yard, in the period 1908–1910, and the GWR insisted on a large financial contribution to the work from the Didcot, Newbury and Southampton Railway Company.

=== Operation ===
When trains from the north-west of England started running through to Southampton in the 1920s, the proprietors of the DN&SR hoped their line would provide the north–south link, but in fact most trains were routed via Reading west curve, using the faster lines with greater capacity.

== Grouping ==
In 1923 the main line railways of Great Britain were "grouped" following the Railways Act 1921. The DN&SR was absorbed into the Great Western Railway group. The intended date of activation was 1 January 1923, but negotiations as to the financial settlement were not concluded in time, and the absorption was finalised on 22 February 1923. As an administrative convenience, a total of railways absorbed on the due date was published, and the official activation date "was in fact officially back-dated by nearly two months in order to be included in this total". The issued capital of the DN&SR was calculated at £1,310,000, and its net income in 1921 was £15,674. The Company had never paid a dividend on ordinary shares.

During the 1930s the line was downgraded, with the removal of most passing loops and signal boxes that were not in stations. Station staff numbers were also reduced. At the same time, the section of line around St Catherine's Hill, north of the Hockley viaduct was moved west by around 55 feet (17 m) to allow the construction of the Winchester Bypass section of the A33 (now itself removed following the building of the M3).

== World War II ==
During World War II the line was a crucial transport link as southern England saw huge movements of troops and military supplies, with intensive use in the run-up to D-Day and the Normandy landings. In preparation extensive capacity enhancement works were undertaken, and the line was temporarily closed in the daytime (Note: According to Mitchell and Robertson; but this may be an ambiguous reference to 24-hour closure.) between 4 August 1942 and 8 March 1943; during this period the Didcot to Newbury section was doubled, as was the first 2 miles (3 km) south of Newbury, as far as Woodhay. Crossing loops were considerably extended (from typically 300 yards (270 m) to 500 yards (460 m)) at stations between Newbury and Winchester, and some additional crossing points were established.

As part of this work a direct connection was made to the South West Main Line where the DN&SR crossed it near Winchester Junction, some distance north of the city. This was named the Worthy Down Loop and was provided to minimise conflicting movements at Shawford Junction, by which up DN&SR trains had had to cross down LSWR line trains. The construction of the spur required the removal of considerable volumes of spoil; it opened on 5 May 1943. It was closed in 1951 and after use as a wagon storage siding for some years, it was lifted in 1962.

At its peak the line was carrying 120 train movements a day. Auxiliary token instruments were provided at the extremity of the loops, and a considerable technical workload resulted in restoring the unbalanced token extractions. (Note: When a train was waiting for a path at the loop exit signal, the opposing train would deliver its token to the signalman at the signalbox; but the waiting train would now extract the token from the auxiliary instrument. Signal engineering staff department had to equalise the tokens manually.) The remote loop points were electrically operated by hand generator at the signalboxes.

An additional halt, at Barton Stacey (between Whitchurch and Sutton Scotney), was built in the early 1940s for military purposes, but was demolished after the war.

== Decline ==
The traffic carried by the DN&SR largely consisted of heavy through goods trains with an average of eleven trains per day even in the 1960s when passenger services were being reduced.

From the mid-1950s the competition from road transport—particularly motor buses—was seriously reducing the line's income. In an attempt to offer some economy, diesel multiple units (DMUs) were introduced on passenger services on the northern section: the Pressed Steel Class 121 single-car units were commonly used. However, the line was making large losses and it was soon considered for closure. Passenger services to stations south of Newbury ended after the last train on 5 March 1960. Passenger services to stations north of Newbury then ended on 10 September 1962.

The route remained open for through block oil trains in connection with the Fawley oil refinery. A final passenger working took place on a Saturday in early May 1964 when a derailment at Reading blocked the route there. The northbound Pines Express from Bournemouth to Manchester was diverted over the DN&SR line; it made passenger calls at Winchester (Chesil) and Newbury. By this time the Chesil station platforms were in a state of dereliction; passengers were conveyed by bus from the main Winchester station and makeshift boards were used to give them access to the train.

== Engineering works ==
The railway presented some massive engineering challenges as it negotiated the Berkshire and Hampshire Downs. The cuttings at Upton and Tothill together involved the excavation of around 1 million tons of chalk and soil and the Hockley Railway Viaduct is a notable feature as being the longest railway viaduct in Hampshire, and as having a solid concrete core.

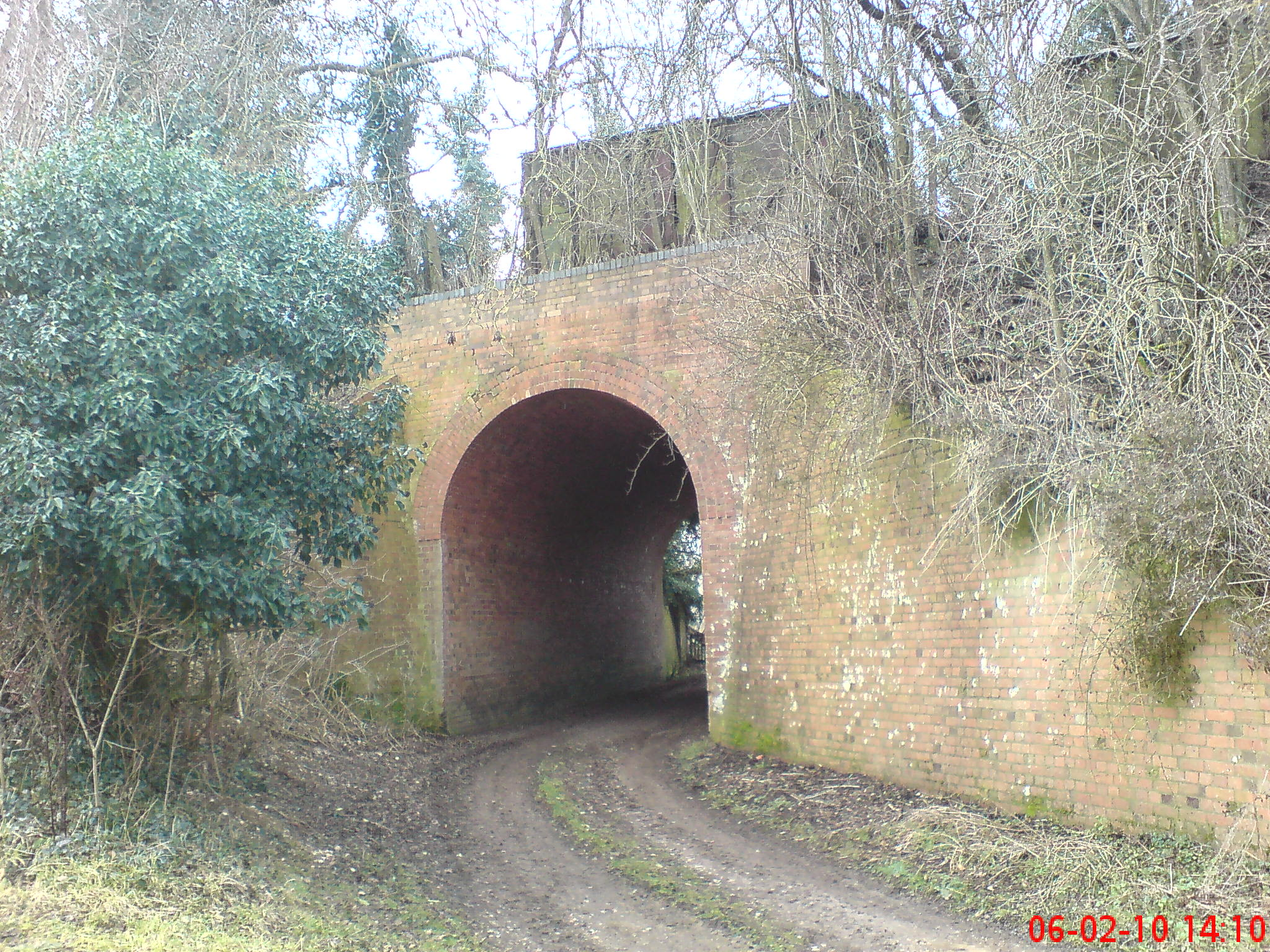
Grounded SR freight wagons on a road bridge near the River Test viaduct.

There was also a tunnel at Winchester leading to the Chesil Street terminus. The engineering drawings for the tunnel put its length at 439 yards (401 m). Navvies and railway workers were paid 'tunnel allowance' (a wage bonus) for working in tunnels 1/4 mile (440 yards, 400 m) or more in length. After protests from the workforce, the tunnel was re-measured. The tunnel was constructed on a curve, and the outside edge of the tunnel was found to be 441 yards (403 m) in length, thus allowing the extra money to be paid to workers.

The line "was claimed to be" the first to employ a steam navvy (a steam-powered mechanical digger) in its construction.

Winchester Chesil station was chosen for an innovative system of signalling, developed in about 1923 by L. M. G. Ferreira of Siemens Brothers and R. J. Insell of the GWR. A route setting frame was installed, with miniature levers: the frame was small, measuring 34 in × 28 in (86 cm × 71 cm). It was a forerunner of the one control switch system; the levers set up routes; when the lever was moved to mid-stroke the interlocking proved that the route was free and no conflicting move had been set up; and the points moved to the required position, after which the lever could be moved to the reverse position and the signal cleared. There were 16 miniature levers and 15 routes could be selected; the sixteenth was a king lever. The points were operated by a 120-volt supply from the signal box. Track circuits were provided at the points: they were described as "point protection tracks", that is, route locking track circuits, but there were no track circuits in the plain line. The night illumination was provided by oil lamps except for two signals located in the tunnel; ground signals were miniature semaphores of novel design.

The installation proved the system for implementation at larger centres, in particular Newport (Monmouthshire); the Winchester system was replaced by a conventional lever frame in 1933.

== Topography ==
Map of the Newbury - Shawford section of the line

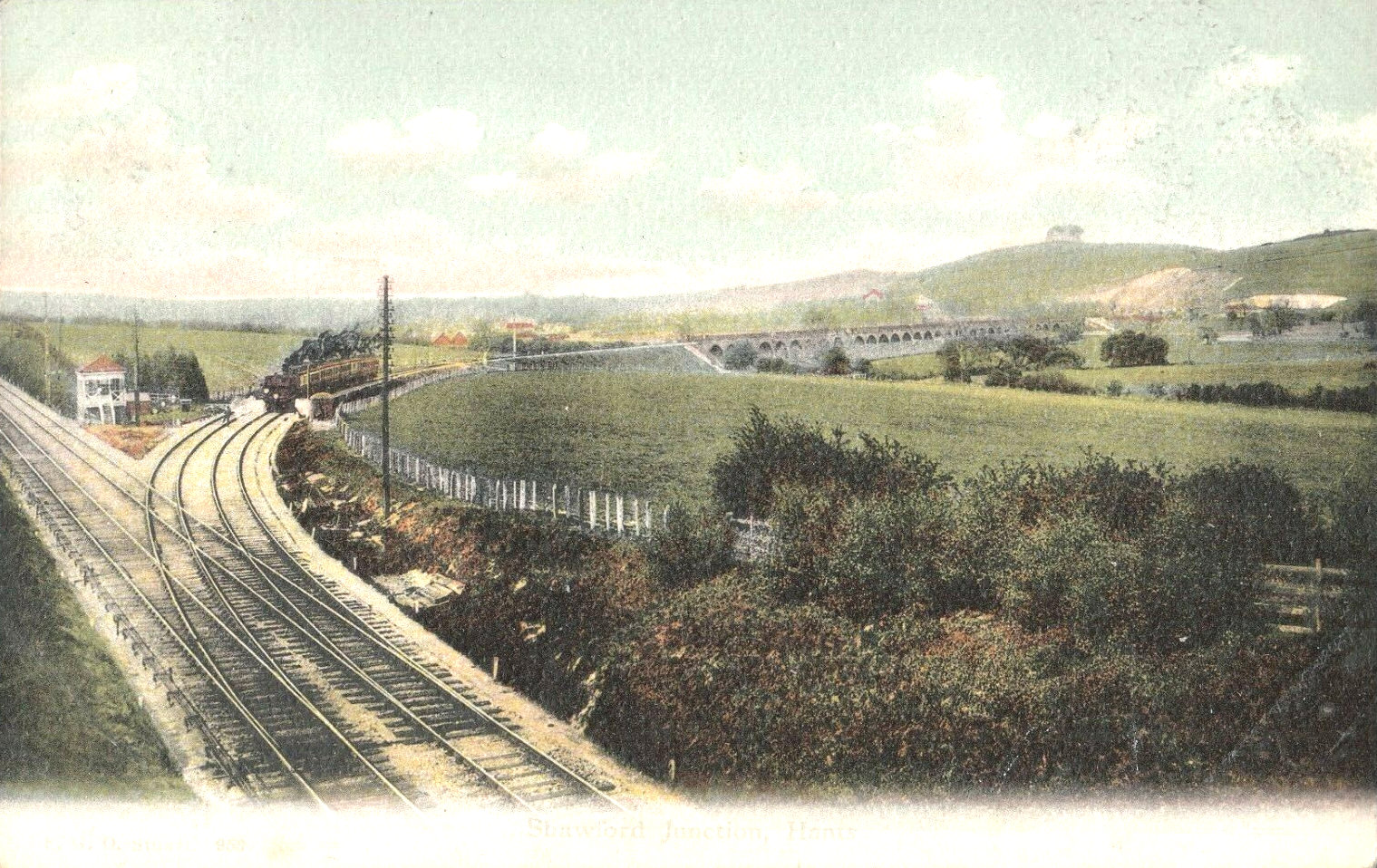
Shawford Junction in 1906; a train is approaching from the DN&SR line

Crossing the grain of the terrain, the line incorporated considerable gradients: the ruling gradient was 1 in 106. The down direction was from north to south.

There was a dedicated bay platform at Didcot (17 mi 49 ch) and the line ran east out of the station, turning immediately south, climbing to a summit at Ilsley, at milepost 12 1/2. From there the line fell more gently to milepost 7 near Hampstead Norris, climbing again to a second summit at milepost 5, then falling towards Newbury. The line joined the GWR Berks and Hants line at Newbury East Junction (milepost 0) and southbound DN&SR trains ran through Newbury station east to west, diverging southwards again at Enborne Junction (milepost 0). Again climbing to another summit near Highclere at milepost 4 the line next descended gently. There was a further climb from Sutton Scotney at milepost 10 1/2 to a further summit at milepost 20 1/2, whence the line fell to Winchester. The Winchester station was at 25 mi 20 ch, and Shawford Junction was at 27 mi 26 ch.

=== Stations and other locations ===
- Didcot (GWR station)
- Didcot East Junction
- Upton; renamed Upton and Blewbury 16 January 1911
- Churn; opened 6 July 1888 as a private station; opened to the public 1905
- Compton
- Hampstead Norris
- Pinewood Halt; opened 11 September 1933
- Hermitage
- Newbury East Junction
- Newbury (GWR station)
- Enborne Junction
- Woodhay
- Highclere
- Burghclere
- Litchfield
- Whitchurch; renamed Whitchurch (Hants) 1 July 1924; renamed Whitchurch Town 26 September 1949
- Barton Stacey; opened 1940; closed December 1941
- Sutton Scotney
- Worthy Down Platform; opened 1 April 1918 after use for work; renamed Worthy Down Halt from 1951
- Worthy Down Junction; spur to Winchester Junction on LSWR line
- King's Worthy; opened 1 February 1909
- Winchester Cheesehill; renamed Winchester Chesil 26 September 1949
- Bar End goods
- Shawford Junction with LSWR

Churn station was opened privately on 6 July 1888, for the National Rifle Association (NRA), which needed to find larger accommodation for its competitions. Lord Wantage was a prominent member NRA and a Director of the Company, and hoped to encourage the traffic that might result. There was "no visible access by road, lying in a vast ploughed field". The National Rifle Association found the railway facilities insufficient, and settled on Bisley as their home for subsequent competitions. The platform was extended in 1894, and became a public station in May 1905. The station was made an island platform when the 1943 doubling took place. Churn features in Victor L. Whitchurch's Thrilling Stories Of the Railway, published 1912, where in the story Sir Gilbert Murrell's Picture, his detective, Thorpe Hazell, investigates a missing truck that ended up in the siding at Churn.

Pinewood Halt was opened to attempt to attract passengers from the north end of Hermitage village.

A passing loop was provided at Lodge Bridge, between Whitchurch and Barton Stacey, as part of the wartime capacity improvements; it was abolished in March 1950.

Worthy Down Platform was provided when the Royal Flying Corps (RFC) established an airfield nearby; from October 1917 trains for workmen engaged in the construction used the platform; it was opened to the public from 1 April 1918. The RFC activity was later taken over by the Royal Air Force (RAF) and in 1938 the Fleet Air Arm used it, its constricted site having become too small for RAF use. A new island platform was constructed in 1943.

== Following 1945 ==
After the Second World War, the DN&SR returned to being a rural backwater line. At the railway nationalisation in 1948, the line, as part of the former GWR, became part of the Western Region of British Railways. On 2 April 1950, the line south of Enborne Junction was transferred to the Southern Region, thus putting it under the same direct management as the South West Main Line.

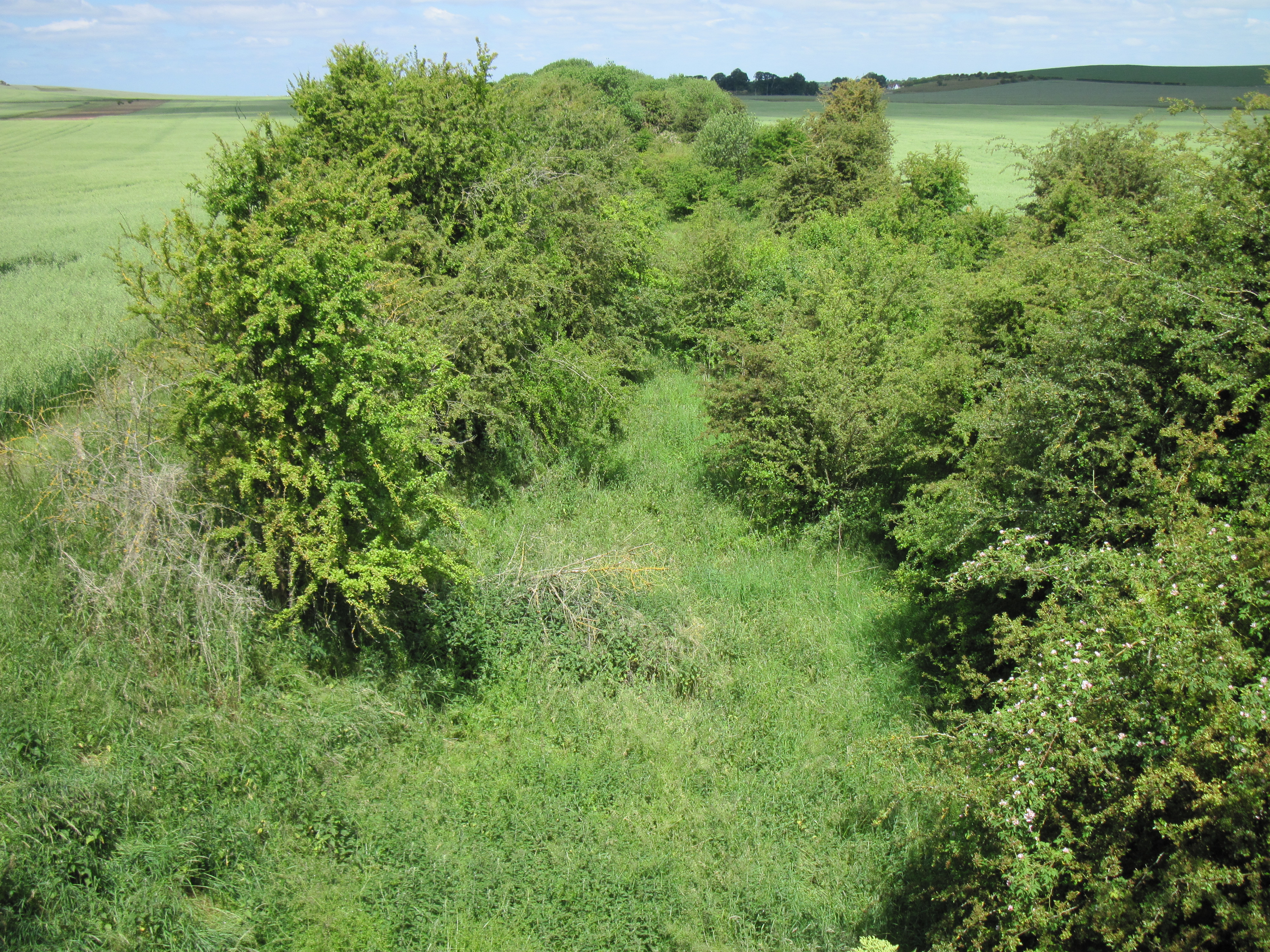
The disused line between Compton and Blewbury over 40 years after closure

Passenger numbers on the DN&SR slowly declined throughout the 1950s, although goods traffic remained healthy – especially chemical and oil traffic to and from Fawley Oil Refinery.

=== Closure for passengers ===
The decline in passenger usage on the line led to proposals for closure, and the section between Newbury and Shawford Junction closed to passenger trains after the last train on 5 March 1960. In fact due to congestion at Winchester City station, Chesil was used for short workings between Southampton and Winchester "although the station was officially closed" during the summer period in 1960 and 1961. Three return workings operated daily, operated by diesel-electric multiple units of type 204. The final service was on 11 September 1961;

The northern section of the line, between Didcot and Newbury was closed on 10 September 1962. The closure preceded publication of the Beeching Report, The Reshaping of British Railways, which was published in March 1963.

=== Closure for goods ===
Goods trains remained, but the goods facilities at the intermediate stations were gradually closed from 1962, leaving only the through goods services until closure 9 August 1964. The line was closed completely south of Newbury in 1965 and north of Newbury on 19 October 1967. Parts of the railway's course and earthworks are now used by the A34 between Newbury and Winchester. The road generally closely follows the railway's former course. In villages formerly served by the railway, such as Sutton Scotney, the remains of bridges and earthworks are still standing, and indeed much of the northern section between Didcot and Newbury is still entirely extant.

=== Re-opening campaign ===
From about 2014 to 2018 a pressure group called Didcot, Newbury & Southampton Railway Revival campaigned for the re-opening of part of the line for both passenger and freight traffic. In addition to diversions from the original route due to redevelopment, this would have been likely to require the modification or replacement of existing structures and bridges to accommodate both the W10 freight loading gauge and overhead electrification and the modification of cutting and embankment slopes to meet modern infrastructure requirements. The pressure group is now defunct.

== Gallery ==
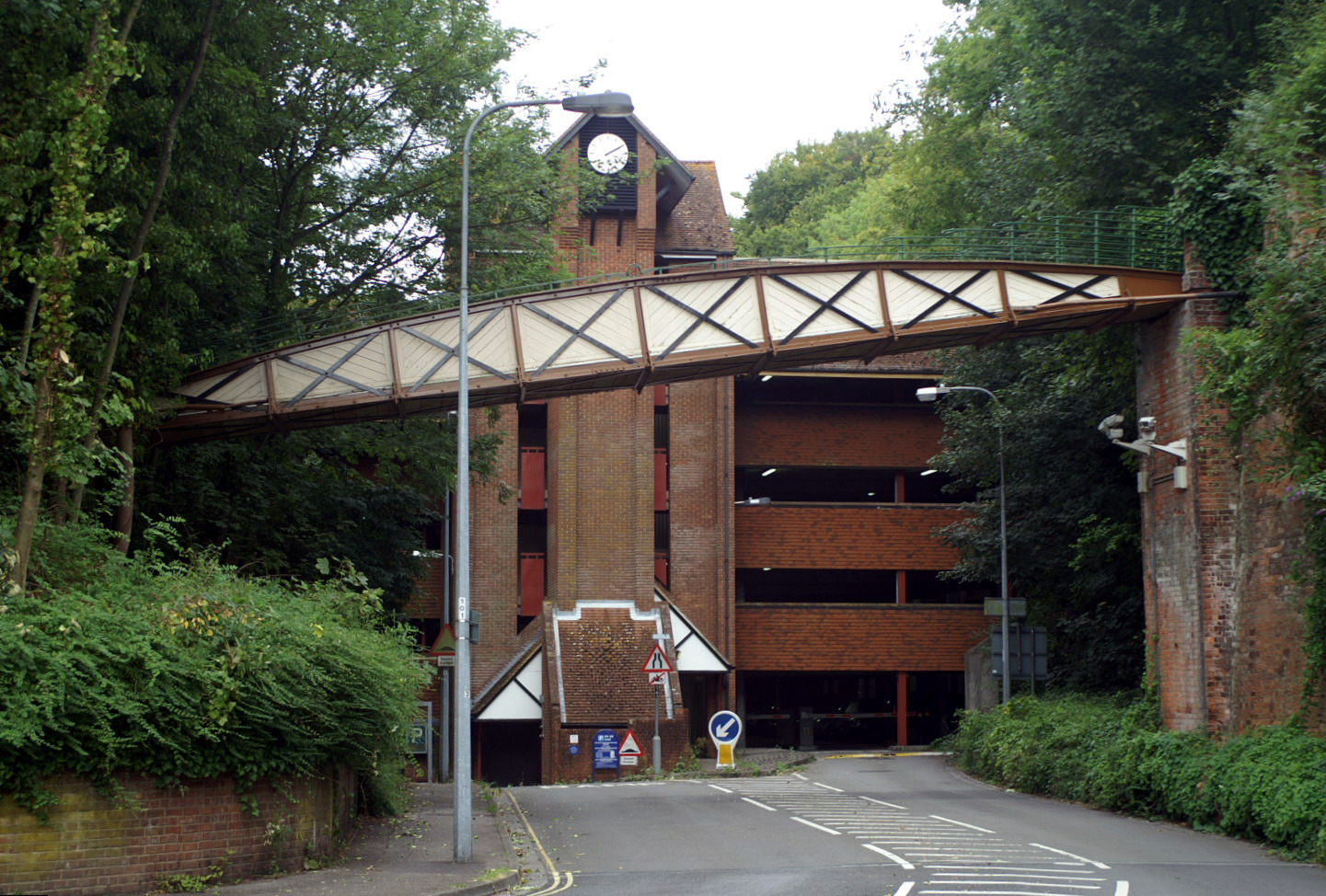
An original footbridge crosses Winchester Chesil station site. The route is blocked by multi-storey car park, behind which is the tunnel.

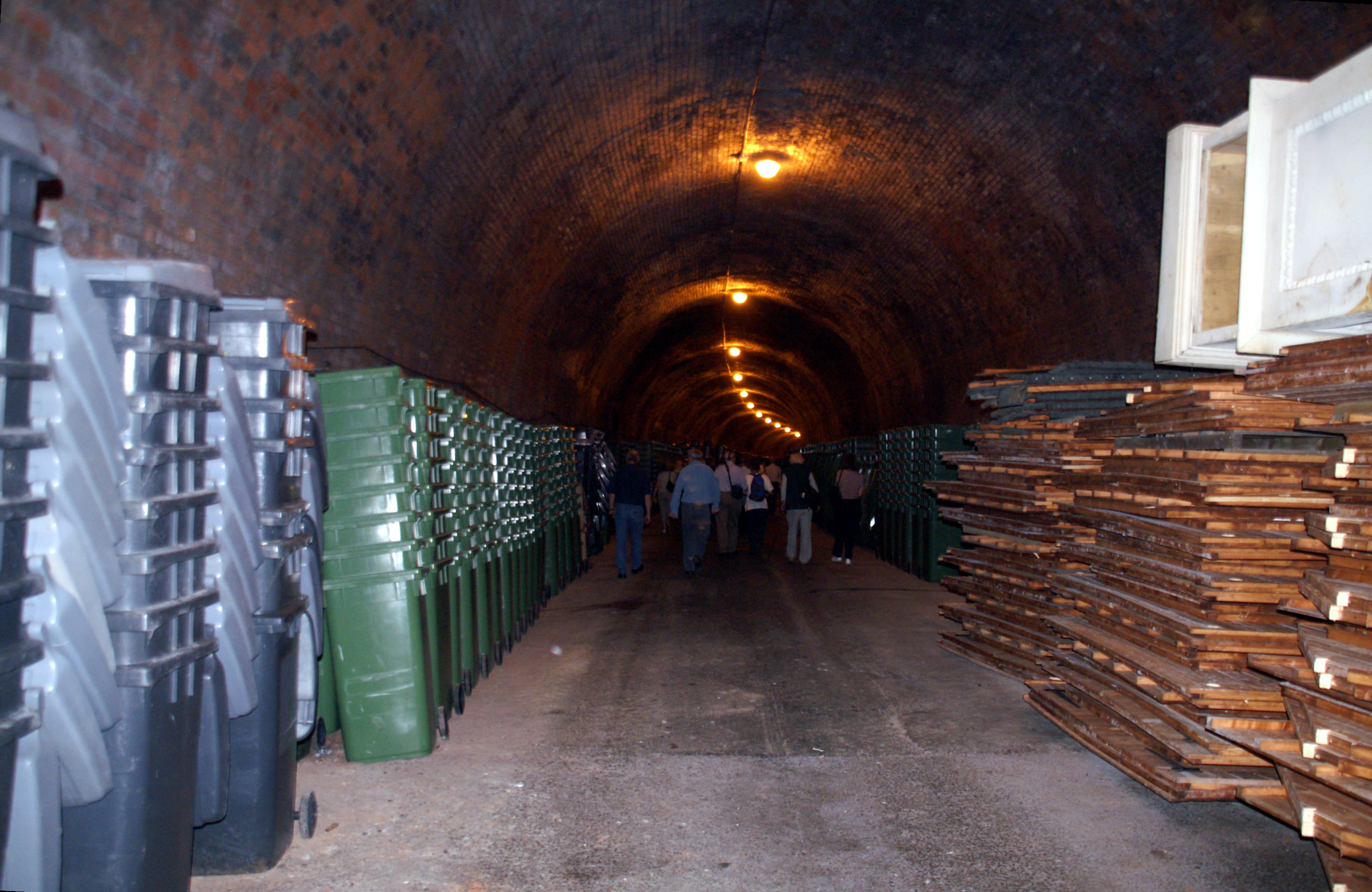
Winchester Chesil tunnel - now used as council store

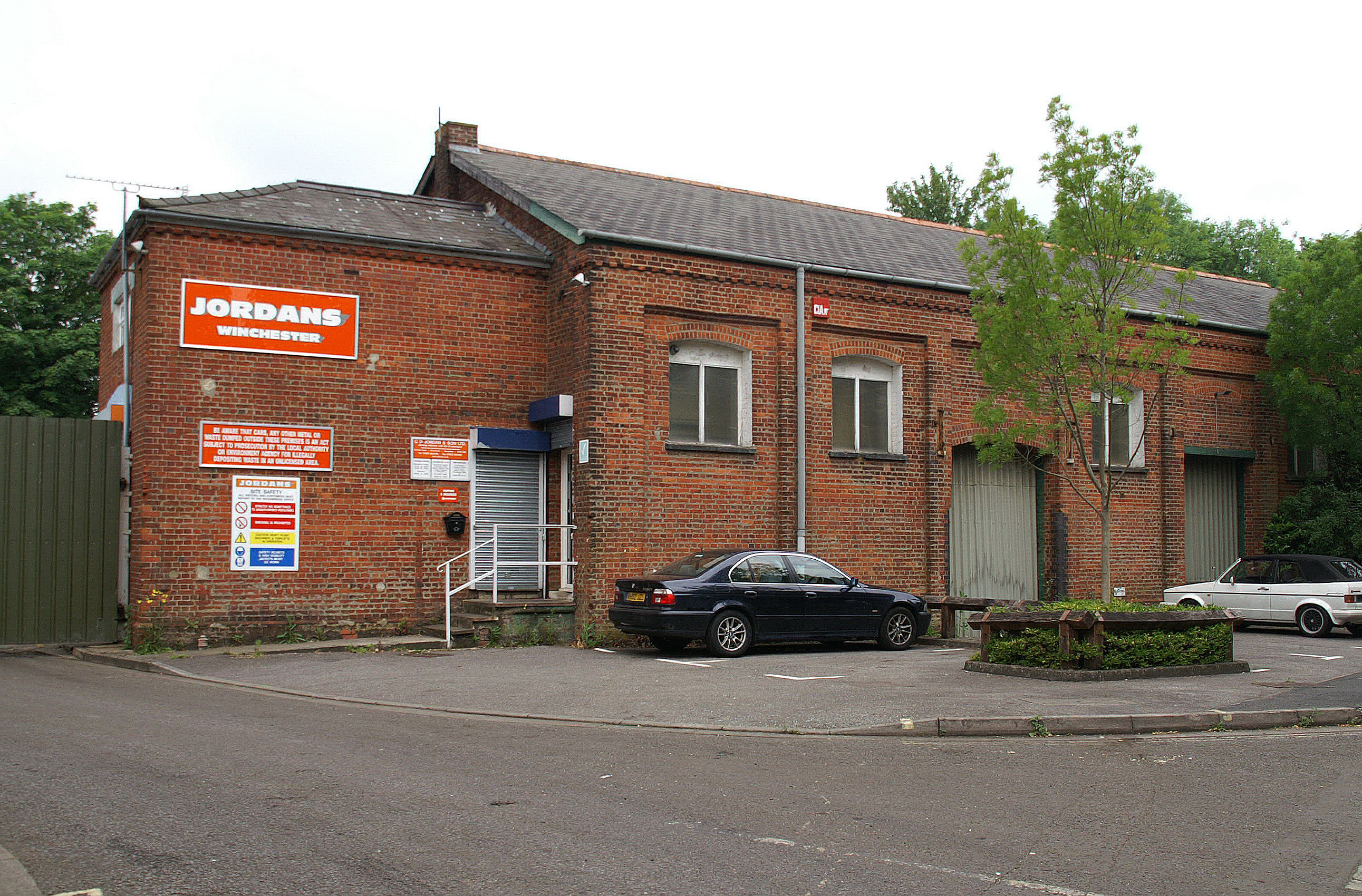
Former goods shed, Winchester Chesil

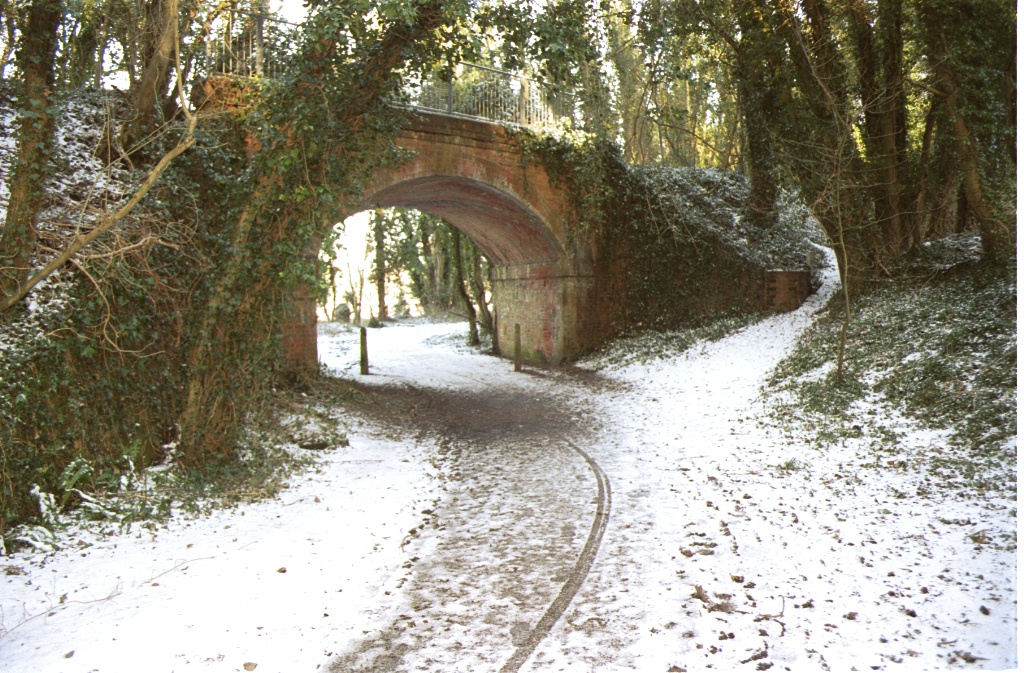
DN&SR bridge over Itchen Way footpath, between Chesil and Hockley Viaduct

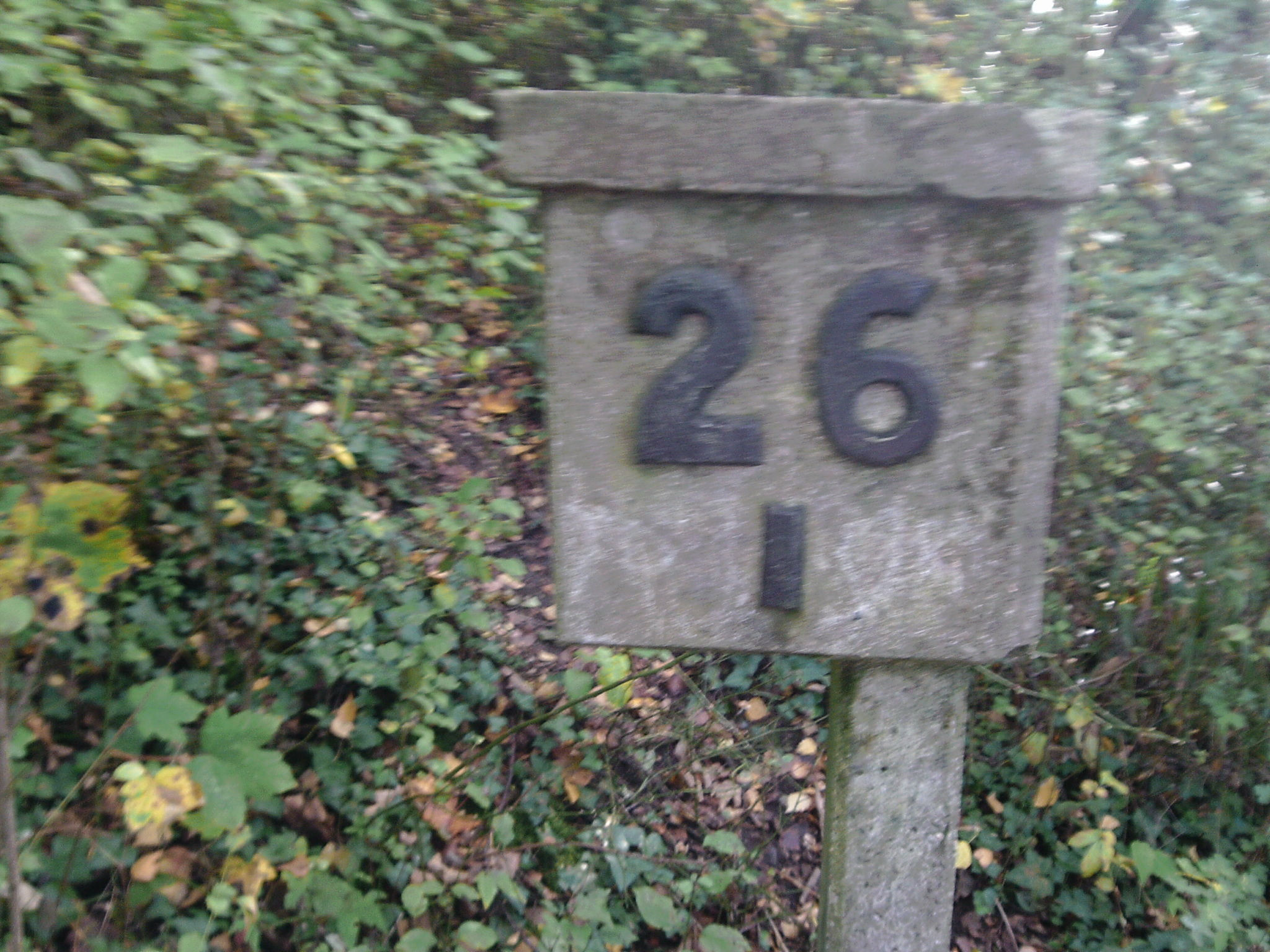
DN&SR milepost near Hockley Railway Viaduct

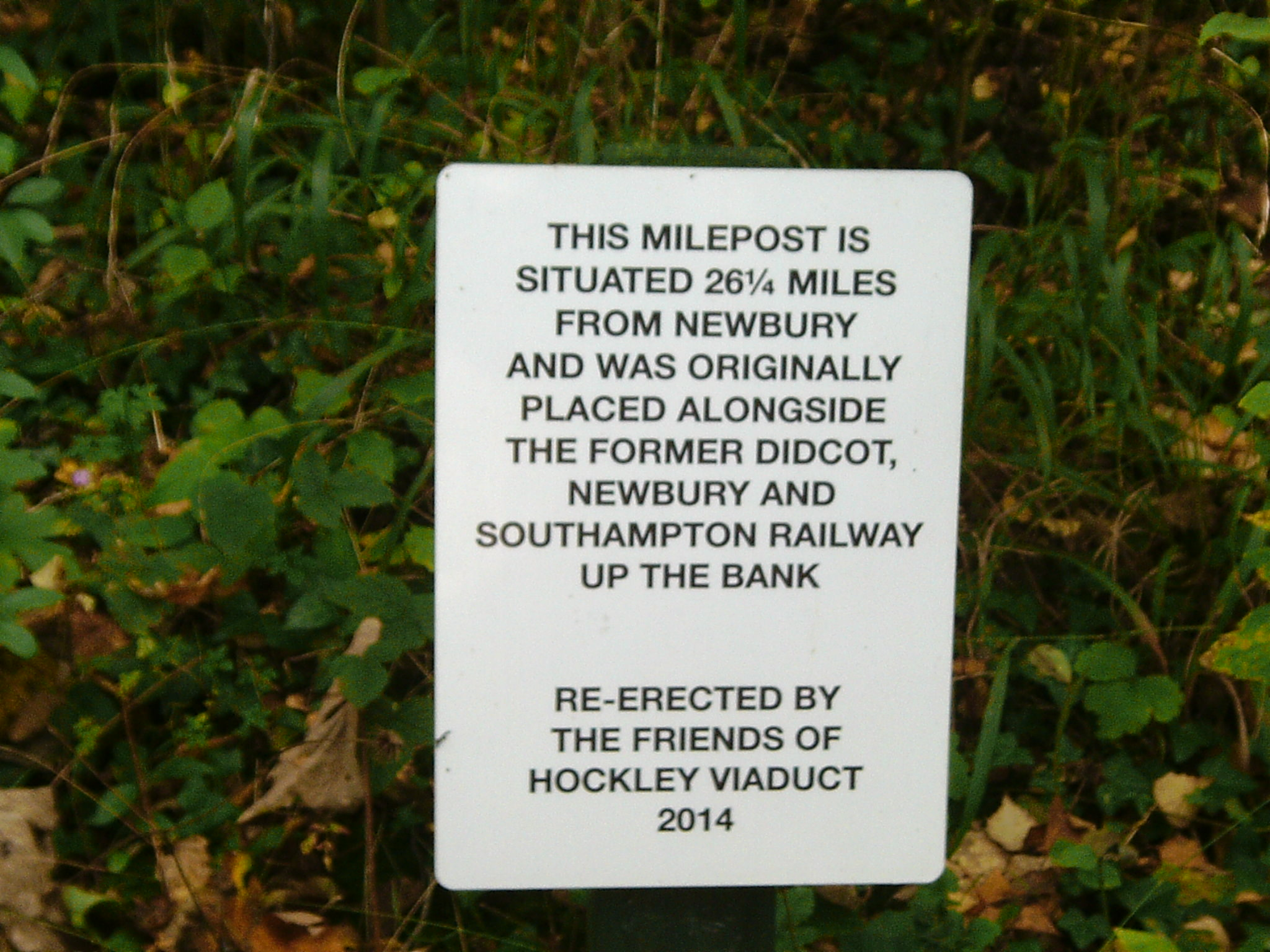
Description of milepost
