= Whitchurch Town railway station =

Disused railway station in Hampshire, England

Whitchurch Town
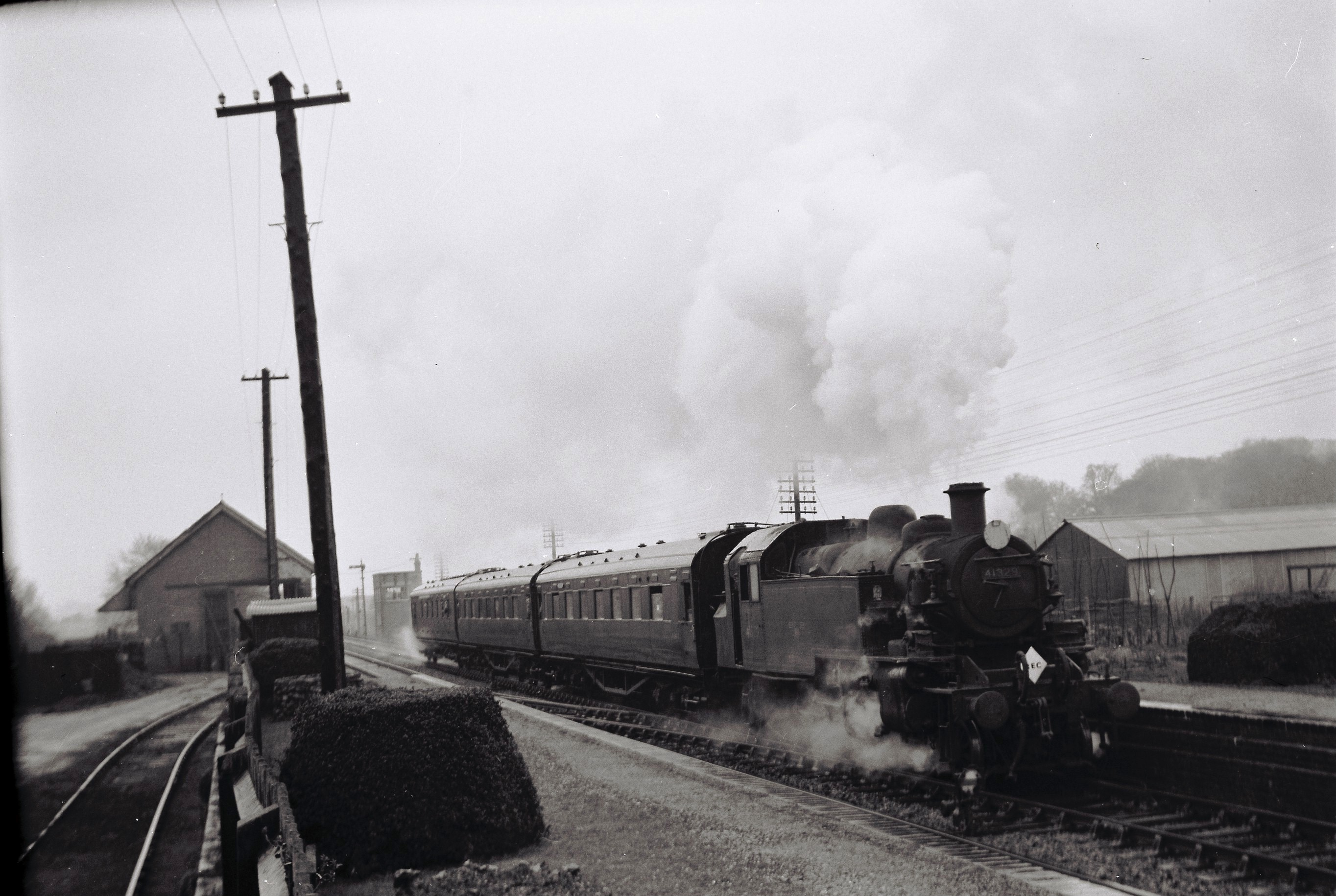
- LMS Ivatt Class 2 2-6-2T No. 41329 passes the station in the 1960s.

General information
- Location: Whitchurch, Basingstoke and Deane; England
- Coordinates: 51.2289°N 1.3433°W
- Grid reference: SU459479
- Platforms: 2

Other information
- Status: Disused

History
- Original company: Didcot, Newbury and Southampton Railway
- Pre-grouping: Didcot, Newbury and Southampton Railway
- Post-grouping: Great Western Railway

Key dates
- 4 May 1885: Opened as Whitchurch
- 1 July 1924: Renamed Whitchurch (Hants)
- 4 August 1942: Closed
- 8 March 1943: Reopened as Whitchurch (Hants)
- 26 September 1949: Renamed Whitchurch Town
- 7 March 1960: Closed to passengers
- 6 May 1963: Closed to goods
Location

Whitchurch Town railway station was a stop on the Didcot, Newbury and Southampton Railway between 1885 and 1960. It served the town of Whitchurch, in Hampshire, England.

== History ==
The Didcot, Newbury and Southampton Railway (DN&SR) was opened in stages. The section between Enborne Junction (to the west of Newbury) and Winchester was formally opened on 1 May 1885, public services beginning on 4 May; among the original stations was one named Whitchurch. It was 12 miles 57 chains (20.5 km) from Enborne Junction, and 31 miles 64 chains (51.2 km) from Didcot.

The town was already served by Whitchurch railway station (Hampshire) on the London and South Western Railway (LSWR), which survives to this day. The DN&SR had a choice of connecting to the LSWR and building a station nearby to aid interchange traffic; however, it decided to build the station further south, closer to the town.

== Accidents and incidents ==
- On 23 September 1954, a freight train hauled by BR Standard Class 4 2-6-0 No. 76017 overran signals and was derailed by trap points.
- On 12 February 1960, a freight train hauled by BR Standard Class 4 2-6-0 No. 76026 overran signals and was derailed by trap points.

== Facilities ==
The station was relatively large compared to others on this section of the line, including a larger station building on the northbound platform and a subway to link the two platforms. There was also a long passing loop and three sidings complete with a large goods shed. The station also had a water crane and water tower.

== Operations ==
The DN&S was worked by the Great Western Railway (GWR) and, at the 1923 Grouping, the DN&S was absorbed by the GWR. The GWR had other stations also named Whitchurch and, to distinguish them, most were renamed; this one became Whitchurch (Hants) on 1 July 1924.

Preceding station	Disused railways	Following station
Litchfield; Line and station closed	Great Western Railway; Didcot, Newbury and Southampton Railway	Barton Stacey; Line and station closed

== Closure ==
Like other stations on the former DN&S line, Whitchurch (Hants) station was closed temporarily on 4 August 1942, so that the line could be upgraded for wartime freight trains; it reopened on 8 March 1943.

Following the nationalisation of the railways in 1948, British Railways renamed the station Whitchurch Town on 26 September 1949, a name which it retained until closure to passengers on 7 March 1960. Goods services continued, but these ceased as from 6 May 1963.
