= Compton railway station =

Former railway station in England

Coordinates: 51.5148°N 1.2460°W

Compton
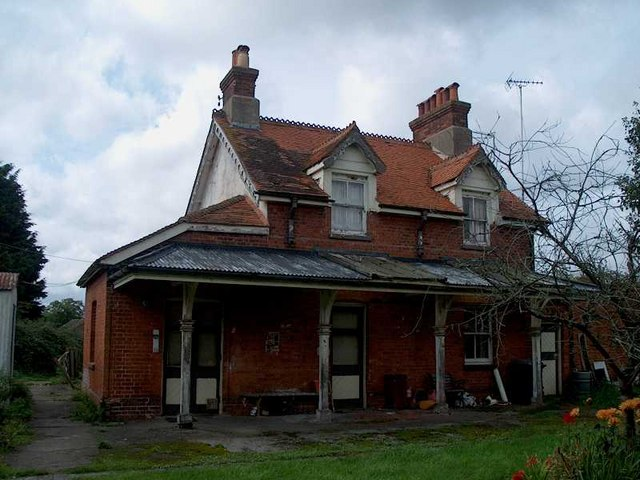
- Compton railway station building

General information
- Location: Compton, West Berkshire, Berkshire; England
- Grid reference: SU524798
- Platforms: 2

Other information
- Status: Disused

History
- Original company: Didcot, Newbury and Southampton Railway
- Pre-grouping: Didcot, Newbury and Southampton Railway
- Post-grouping: Great Western Railway; Western Region of British Railways

Key dates
- 13 August 1882: Opened
- 4 August 1942: Closed
- 8 March 1943: Re-opened
- 10 September 1962: Closed
Location

Compton railway station was a station on the Didcot, Newbury and Southampton Railway in England. Compton was the largest station between Newbury, Berkshire and Didcot, Oxfordshire, serving the villages of Compton, East Ilsley and Aldworth. The station closed in 1962.

== Facilities ==
The station consisted of two platforms with the ticket offices and station buildings located on the Northbound platform. This was the only station with the exceptions of Winchester (Chesil) and Newbury to have a footbridge linking the platforms, most likely to preserve the use of a footpath over which a Public Right of Way existed and to eliminate the danger of users having to cross the line by other means. To the north of the station was a goods shed plus cattle pens and three sidings which supported a busy coal trade and the loading of the products of the foundry. Evidence of the routes of these sidings can still be traced where continued use of weedkillers on the trackbed still inhibits the growth of invasive plants. A signal box was located at the north end of the southbound platform and there is an unusual single-truck bay set into the northbound platform to facilitate the loading of a horse-box to the rear of a Didcot-bound train. There is still the remains of a service road which ran from the station yard down alongside the embankment to meet the village road passing under the nearby bridge; the lower end of which has now been absorbed into the grounds of Compton Primary School. The station received relatively large volumes of goods traffic for the area with Baker's Foundry being located in the nearby village.

== Proposed East Ilsley branch ==
A link line to nearby East Ilsley was planned but never built, although certain parts of the proposed route were levelled and ballasted for reasons as yet unknown. There was a facility at Compton for incorporating the junction and for the stabling of a small locomotive to operate the route.

== The site today ==
The station house, booking hall and some outbuildings (lamp and oil stores and a porter's shed) and the nearby substantial brick road overbridge are still in existence. A public footpath allows access to the platform side revealing the complete platforms but with the trackbed filled in to the same level and laid as a lawn. An enamel "Platform tickets to be given up on leaving platform" sign, although it is not known if this is original. The large, well-built and relatively intact goods shed was demolished in 2001 to make way for a small business area.

== Routes ==
Preceding station	Disused railways	Following station
Churn	Great Western Railway; Didcot, Newbury and Southampton Railway	Hampstead Norris
