= Worthy Down Halt railway station =

Disused railway station in Hampshire, England

Worthy Down Halt
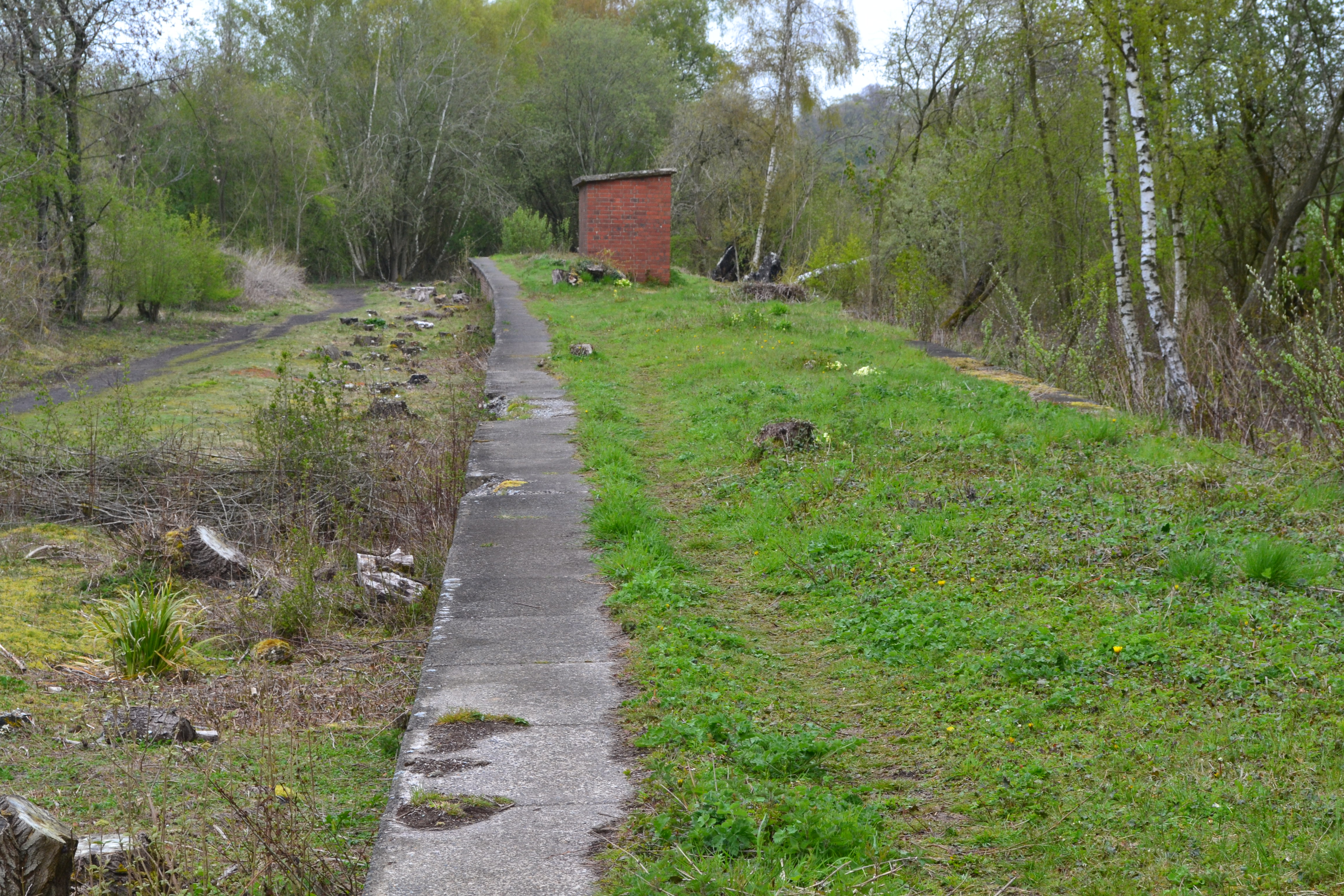

General information
- Location: South Wonston, Winchester; England
- Coordinates: 51.1134°N 1.3159°W
- Grid reference: SU479351
- Platforms: 2

Other information
- Status: Disused

History
- Original company: Didcot, Newbury and Southampton Railway
- Pre-grouping: Didcot, Newbury and Southampton Railway
- Post-grouping: Great Western Railway

Key dates
- 1 April 1918: Opened as Worthy Down Platform
- 4 August 1942: Closed
- 8 March 1943: Re-opened
- 18 June 1951: Renamed Worthy Down Halt
- 7 March 1960: Closed
Location

Worthy Down Halt railway station was built in 1918 as a small single platform halt to serve the Royal Flying Corps (later RAF) depot nearby. It included two passing loops (the shorter of which was used as a siding) to provide supplies to the site. Later, the station became a junction for a spur to connect with the Southern Railway line through Winchester. At this point an additional line was built on the opposite side of the station to provide an island platform serving both northbound and southbound trains on separate lines.

Preceding station	Disused railways	Following station
Sutton Scotney; Line and station closed	Great Western Railway; Didcot, Newbury and Southampton Railway	King's Worthy; Line and station closed
