= Hampstead Norris railway station =

Former railway station in England

Coordinates: 51.4850°N 1.2424°W

Hampstead Norris
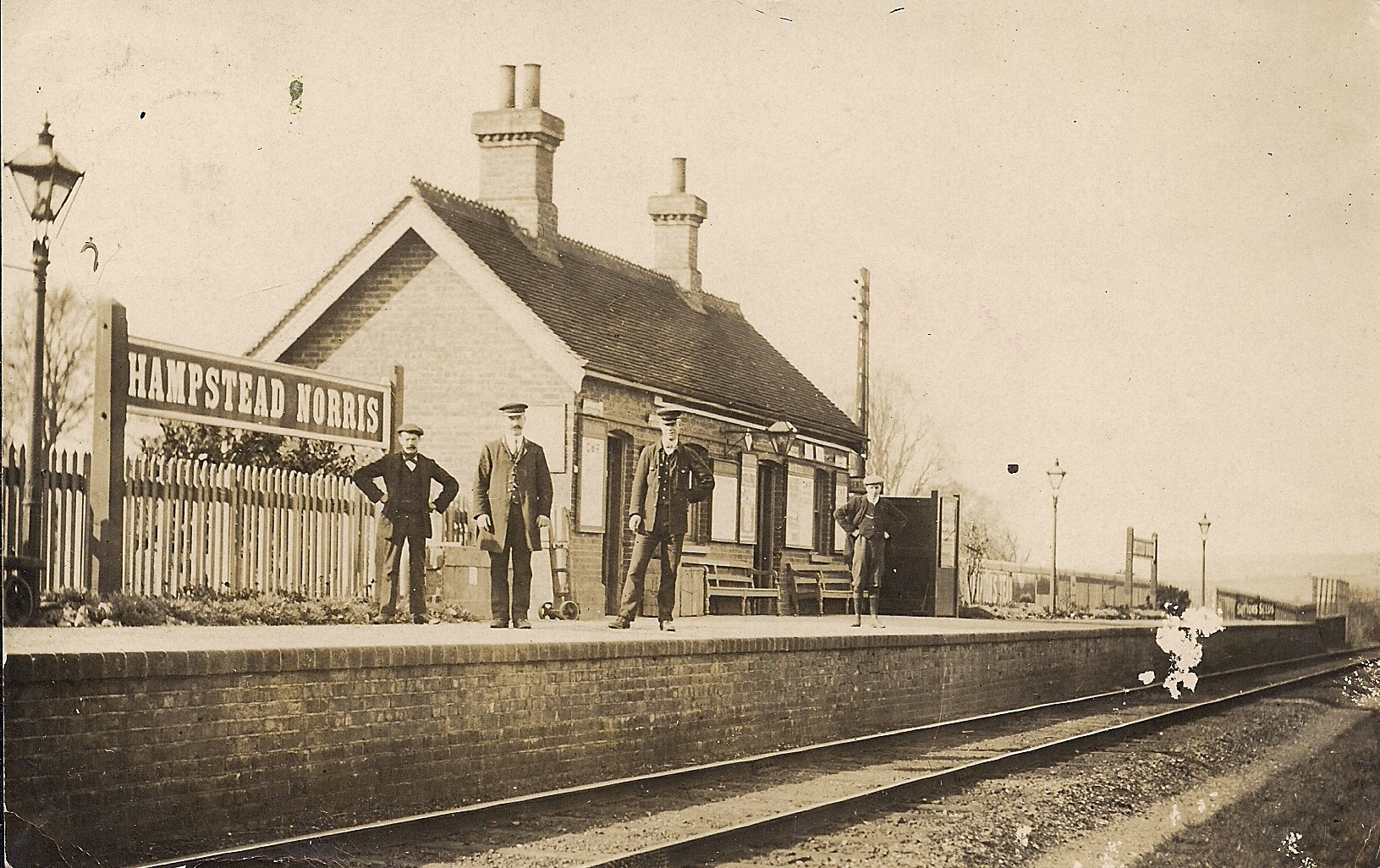

General information
- Location: Hampstead Norreys, West Berkshire; England
- Grid reference: SU527765
- Platforms: 2

Other information
- Status: Disused

History
- Original company: Didcot, Newbury and Southampton Railway
- Pre-grouping: Didcot, Newbury and Southampton Railway
- Post-grouping: Great Western Railway; Western Region of British Railways

Key dates
- 13 April 1882: Opened
- 4 August 1942: Closed
- 8 March 1943: Re-opened
- 10 September 1962: Closed
Location

Hampstead Norris railway station was a station on the Didcot, Newbury and Southampton Railway in England. It served the village of Hampstead Norreys in Berkshire (note spelling differentiation). The station closed in 1962.

== Facilities ==
The station was originally built with only a small ticket office and a single platform serving both northbound and southbound trains. However, due to demand the station was eventually expanded to include a passing loop and an additional platform. A small siding and goods shed were used mainly for agricultural goods.

== Present day ==
The station area has been comprehensively redeveloped and almost the only evidence it was ever in the village is a road called "Station Hill". The rail bridge on entering the village from Hermitage still stands with the stump of a loading crane under the bridge preserved. Another large rail bridge just to the north of the village still stands in good condition. The old railway track between Hampstead Norreys and Hermitage was opened as the Eling Way for pedestrians and cyclists in February 2020, part of a larger plan to establish a path between Didcot and Newbury.

== Services ==
Preceding station	Disused railways	Following station
Compton	Great Western Railway; Didcot, Newbury and Southampton Railway	Pinewood Halt
