= East Ilsley =

Coordinates: 51°30′54″N 1°15′14″W

- Village
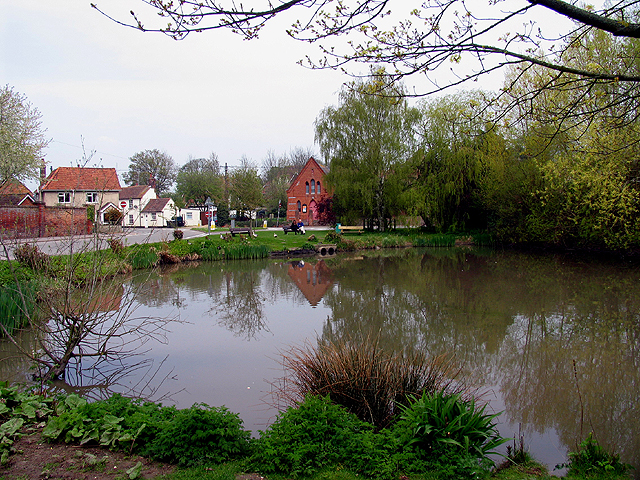
- East Ilsley's village pond and small green with homes

- Location within Berkshire
- Area: 15.02 km^{2} (5.80 sq mi)
- Population: 538 (2011 census)
  - Density: 36/km^{2} (93/sq mi)
- OS grid reference: SU4981
- Civil parish: Compton
- Unitary authority: West Berkshire District Council
- Ceremonial county: Berkshire
- Region: South East
- Country: England
- Sovereign state: United Kingdom
- Post town: Newbury
- Postcode district: RG20
- Dialling code: 01635
- Police: Thames Valley
- Fire: Royal Berkshire
- Ambulance: South Central
- UK Parliament: Reading West and Mid Berkshire
- Website: Official website

East Ilsley is a village and civil parish in the Berkshire Downs in West Berkshire, north of Newbury. The village is centred immediately east of the A34 dual carriageway which passes the length of the village from north to south. It has the vast majority of its buildings in a traditional clustered centre.

== History ==
=== Hildersley ===
The parish was anciently called Hildersley, from Hildeslei in the Domesday Book, and is recorded in a medieval inscription in the church. West Ilsley was a hamlet in Ilsley. Ilsley has been attributed by antiquaries as a leading contender for the uncertain site of the Battle of Ashdown in 871 AD (Alfred the Great's victory against the Danes). Ilsley incidentally means "battle clearing".

=== Sheep fair ===
In 1620 East Ilsley was granted a charter to hold a sheep fair, or market, in the village, however the fair had been informally held from the reign of Henry II. This became the second largest sheep fair in the country, after Smithfield, throughout the 19th century.

Shepherds and drovers would drive their sheep to the village, and stay overnight in one of at least 9 public houses until the fair in the morning. The chief fair took place annually on 1 August, with 80,000 sheep penned daily. By 1909 this had reduced to about 10,000 due to the agricultural depression.

=== Economy in the 1870s ===
Its real property, farms and homes, was worth £4,490 (equivalent to £542,653 in 2023) and its population in the United Kingdom Census 1871 was 746. It had 130 houses. This capital was remarked in a contemporary description as owned by a few. The manor belonged to Capt. Woodley, and great part of the land to Col. Robert Loyd-Lindsay. The benefice remained in the default form of a rectory, rather than a vicarage, in the diocese of Oxford, worth £722 (equivalent to £87,260 in 2023). The patron was Magdalen College, Oxford. There was, by this time, a National School in the village.

== Church ==
The parish Church of St Mary is partly Norman; has an Early English-style chancel and has an embattled tower; it was enlarged and repaired in 1845 and contains an old monument of one of the Hildesleys, the ancient lords of the manor. The church is a Grade I listed building.

== Notable inhabitants ==
- John Hilsey, head of a Dominican Order and bishop of Rochester turned agent of Henry VIII's dissolution of the monasteries, was born here;
- Richard Wightwick, co-founder of Pembroke College, Oxford, rector.
- Frank Williams, founder of Williams Grand Prix Engineering

== Transport ==
=== Rail ===
East Ilsley's nearest station is Didcot Parkway, providing direct services to the West, West Midlands and London. Historically, the village was served by Compton railway station, which opened in 1882 and closed in 1962, on the Didcot, Newbury and Southampton Railway.

=== Buses ===
East Ilsley is served by buses 6 and 6A from Newbury.

=== Roads and footpaths ===
The Ridgeway long-distance footpath passes through a subway below the A34, approximately one mile north of the village.

== Racehorse training ==
Racehorses have been trained at East Ilsley for about 200 years, as an offshoot from the economic centre of training in the United Kingdom and Ireland, ten miles west at Lambourn. Hugh Morrison trains racehorses at Summerdown, East Ilsley.

At Keats Gore, a mansion near East Ilsley, the celebrated racehorse Eclipse was foaled in 1764, and afterwards trained. He was later moved to Cannons Park near Edgware.

== Demography ==
Of its 216 homes in 2011, the majority in this parish were owner-occupied; just over 10% were socially rented.

2011 Census Key Statistics
Output area	Population	Homes	Owned outright	Owned with a loan	Privately rented	Socially rented	Other	km^{2}	km^{2} Greenspace (Note: Comprises cultivated fields, pasture, woodland and common.)	km^{2} gardens	km^{2} road
East Ilsley (civil parish)	538	216	65	85	28	29	9	12.6	12.1	0.1	0.2
