= Churn railway station =

Former railway station in England

Coordinates: 51.5390°N 1.2560°W

Churn
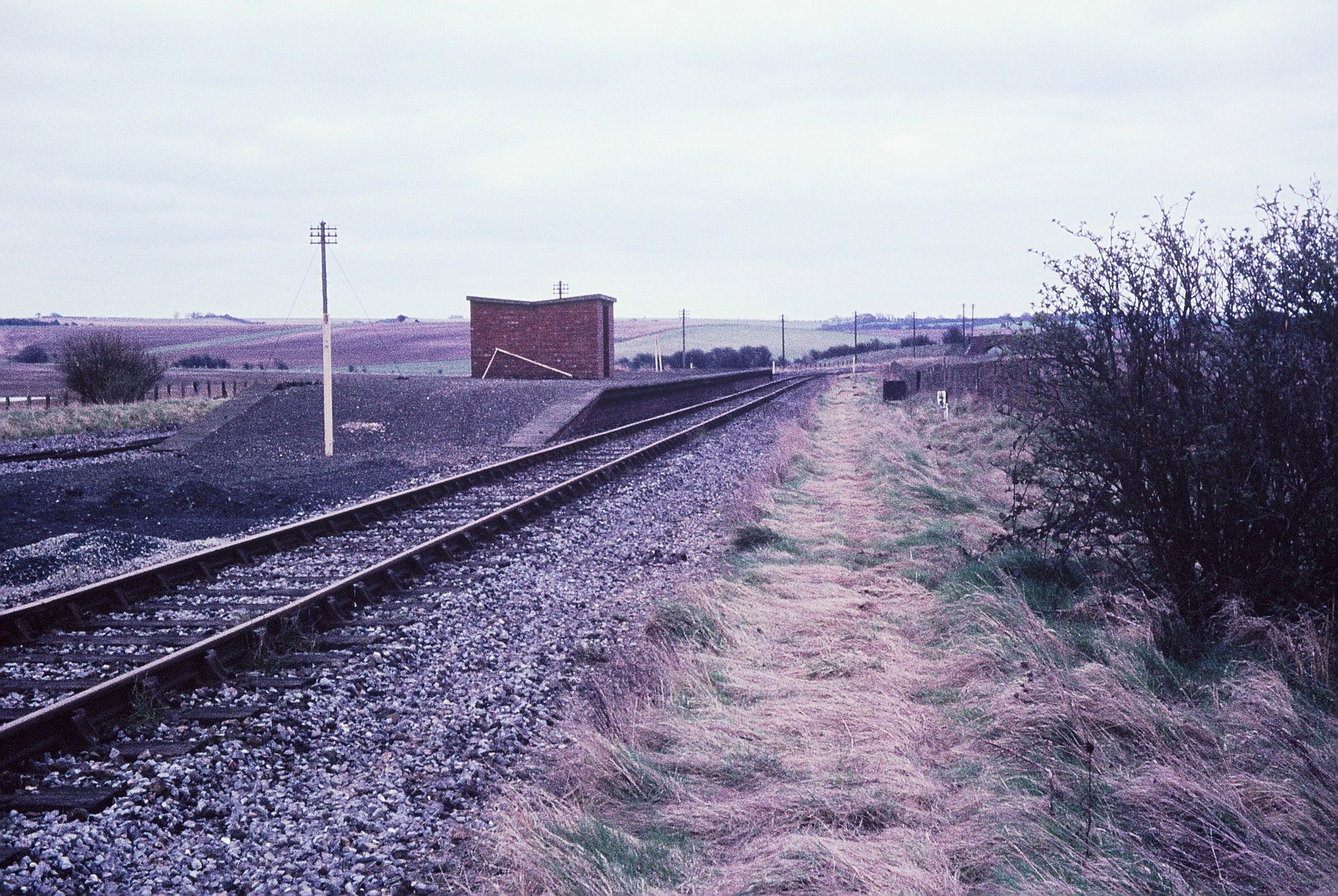
- Station in 1967.

General information
- Location: Churn Down, Vale of White Horse, Oxfordshire; England
- Grid reference: SU517825
- Platforms: 2

Other information
- Status: Disused

History
- Original company: Didcot, Newbury and Southampton Railway
- Pre-grouping: Didcot, Newbury and Southampton Railway
- Post-grouping: Great Western Railway; Western Region of British Railways

Key dates
- 6 July 1888: Opened (private station)
- 1905: Opened for public use
- 4 August 1942: Closed
- 8 March 1943: Re-opened
- 10 September 1962: Closed
Location

Churn railway station was a station on the Didcot, Newbury and Southampton Railway in England. It served Churn Down, a remote part of the Berkshire Downs. The nearest village was Blewbury, two miles north, which was already served by Upton and Blewbury railway station, the previous station on the line.

== History ==
This was a small and very isolated single platform halt with access only via an unmetalled downland sheep road. It was built as a temporary stop to accommodate a competition held by the National Rifle Association in 1888. However, from 1889 military summer camps were established near to the station which required the use of the halt as the only access to the site. Timetables provided that trains would not call at Churn unless prior notice had been given to the Stationmaster at Didcot.

== Facilities ==
The station buildings consisted of no more than a simple wooden shelter and basic lavatories. In order to provide deliveries of goods for the camps a small siding was built at the southern end of the station.

== In fiction ==
In 1905 it was the subject of a fictional crime mystery, Sir Gilbert Murrell's Picture, part of Thrilling Stories of the Railways by Victor Whitechurch (1905)

== Closure ==
The station closed in 1962 when the entire line was closed to passenger traffic. Freight operations ceased in 1966.

== Routes ==
Preceding station	Disused railways	Following station
Upton and Blewbury	Great Western Railway; Didcot, Newbury and Southampton Railway	Compton
