= Barton Stacey railway station =

Disused railway station in Hampshire, England

Coordinates: 51.1773°N 1.3548°W

Barton Stacey Halt

General information
- Location: Upper Bullington, Test Valley; England
- Grid reference: SU452422
- Platforms: 1

Other information
- Status: Disused

History
- Original company: Great Western Railway
- Post-grouping: Great Western Railway

Key dates
- 1939/1940: Opened
- 2 December 1940: Closed
Location

Barton Stacey railway station was a small single platform halt serving an army camp near the village of Barton Stacey. It was opened by February 1940; there was a regular workers' train from Southampton by that date. Little else is known, primarily because of its military association; and its whole life was during wartime — it closed in December 1940.

== Routes ==
Preceding station	Disused railways	Following station
Whitchurch Town; Line and station closed	Great Western Railway; Didcot, Newbury and Southampton line	Sutton Scotney; Line and station closed
