= Hockley, Virginia =

Hockley, Virginia may refer to:

- Hockley, Gloucester County, Virginia
- Hockley, King and Queen County, Virginia
