= Sutton Scotney railway station =

Disused railway station in Hampshire, England

Coordinates: 51.1529°N 1.3365°W

Sutton Scotney
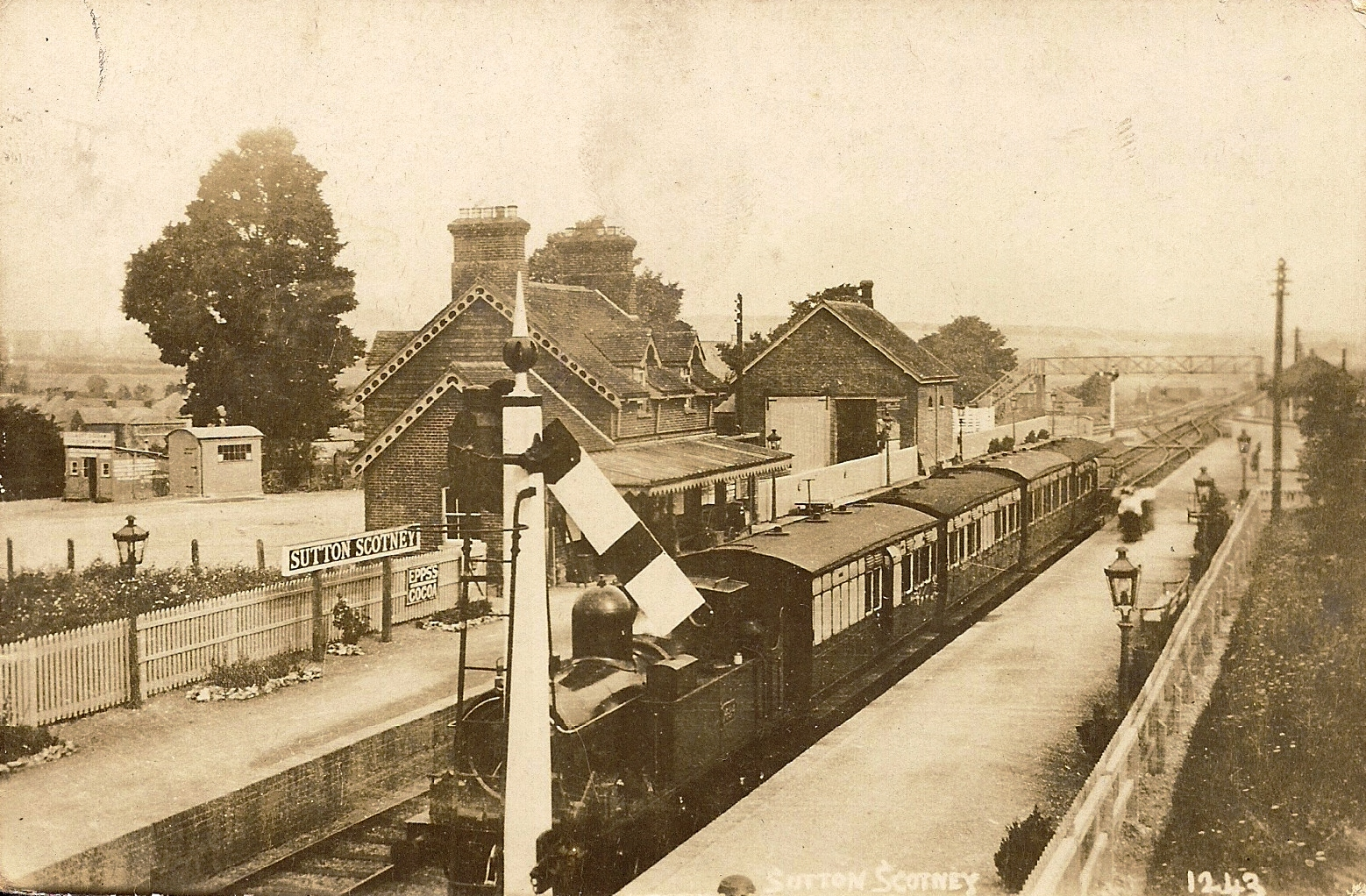

General information
- Location: Sutton Scotney, Winchester; England
- Grid reference: SU465395
- Platforms: 2

Other information
- Status: Disused

History
- Original company: Didcot, Newbury and Southampton Railway
- Pre-grouping: Didcot, Newbury and Southampton Railway
- Post-grouping: Great Western Railway

Key dates
- 4 May 1885: Opened
- 4 August 1942: Closed
- 8 March 1943: Re-opened
- 7 March 1960: Closed
Location

Sutton Scotney railway station is a disused station which served the village of Sutton Scotney a few miles north of Winchester on the Didcot, Newbury and Southampton Railway.

== Facilities ==
It was the last station to use the standard design station buildings on the southbound platform. As per most stations there was a passing loop and a single siding and the station did see considerable goods traffic from local farms including watercress and pigs.

== Map ==
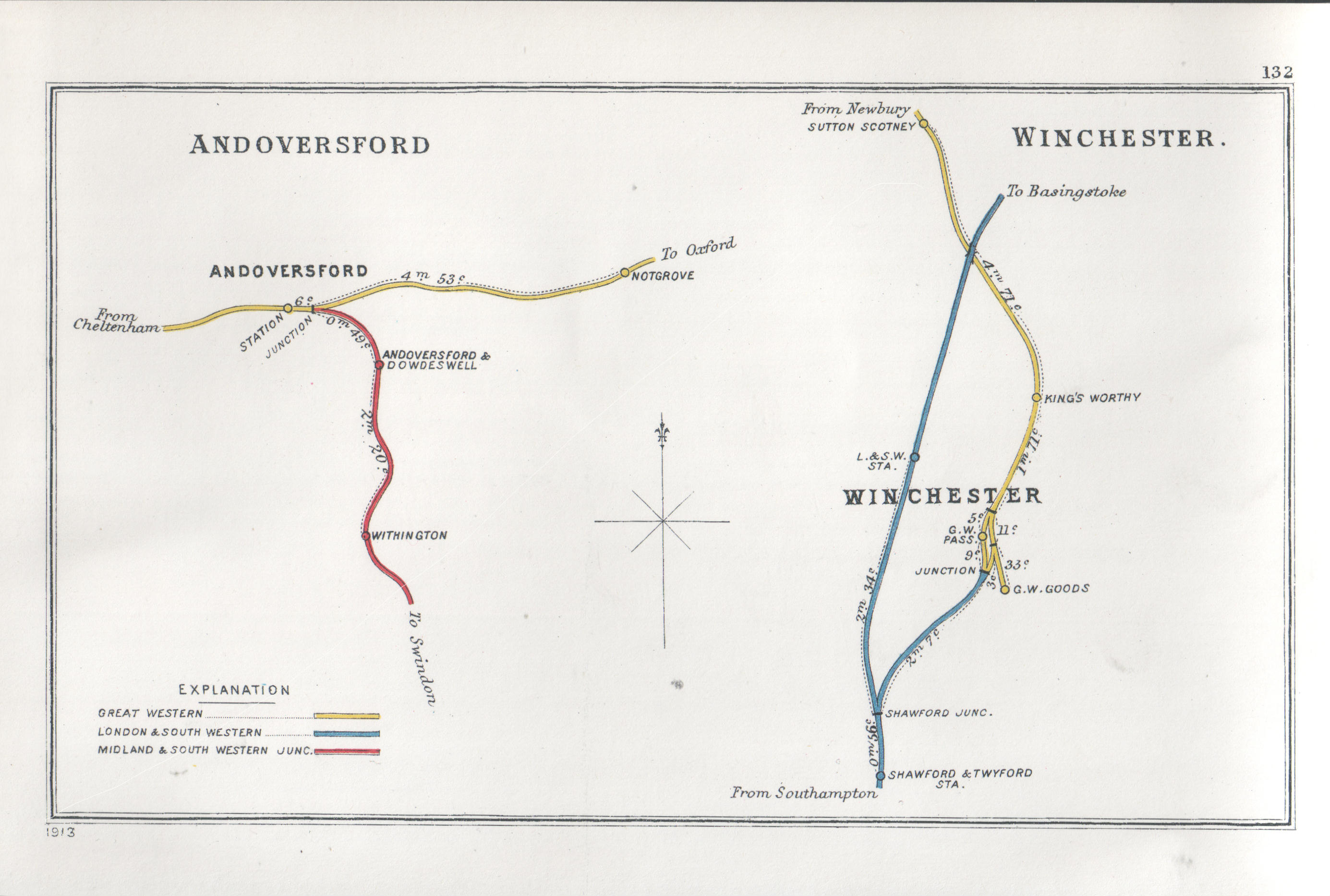
A 1913 Railway Clearing House map showing (right) railways in the vicinity of Sutton Scotney

== Routes ==
Preceding station	Disused railways	Following station
Barton Stacey; Line and station closed	Great Western Railway; Didcot, Newbury and Southampton Railway	Worthy Down Halt; Line and station closed
