= Hockley Railway Viaduct =

Bridge in United Kingdom

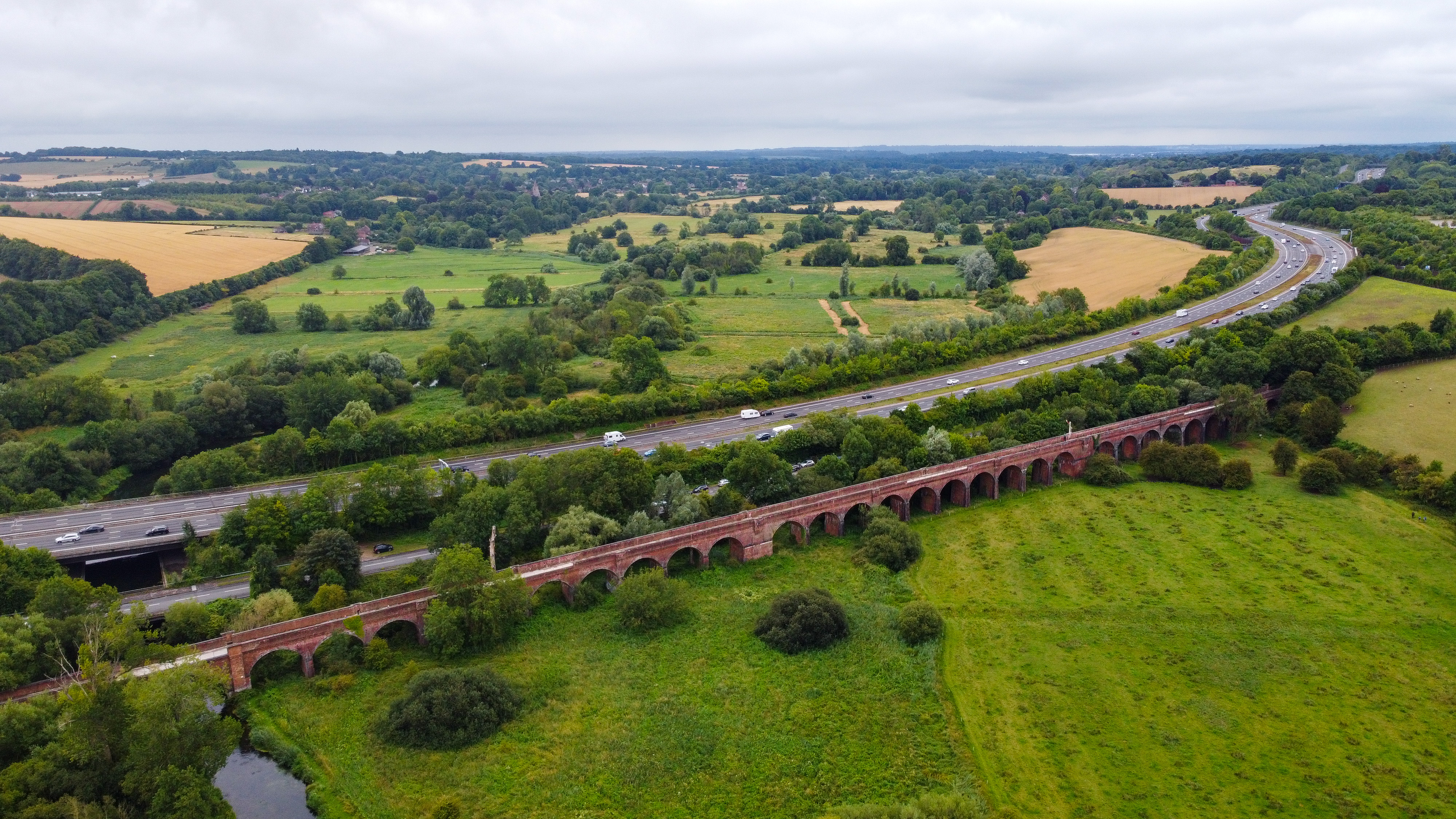
- The Hockley Railway Viaduct in 2020
- Coordinates: 51°02′13″N 1°19′16″W
- Crosses: River Itchen
- Other name: Shawford Viaduct
- Owner: Winchester City Council

Characteristics
- Material: Brick clad concrete
- Total length: 2,014 feet (614 m)

History
- Designer: W. R. Galbraith
- Constructed by: London and South Western Railway
- Opened: October 1891
- Closed: April 1966

Location
- Interactive map of Hockley Railway Viaduct

The Hockley Railway Viaduct is a disused railway viaduct to the south of Winchester in Hampshire, England.

== History ==
The viaduct, originally called the Shawford Viaduct, was built in the late 1880s by the London and South Western Railway (LSWR). It provided a link over the River Itchen and water meadows, from the Didcot, Newbury and Southampton Railway (DN&SR), to the LSWR's main line. The DN&SR was originally intended to continue down the east side of the Itchen to Southampton, but had stalled at Winchester due to lack of funds. The viaduct crossed the valley to link the DN&SR to the LSWR, which ran (and still runs) down the west side of the valley.

The viaduct was last used by the railway on 2 April 1966. The line it carried closed as a result of the Beeching Axe, and is now open to walkers and cyclists as part of National Cycle Network Route 23.

== Construction ==
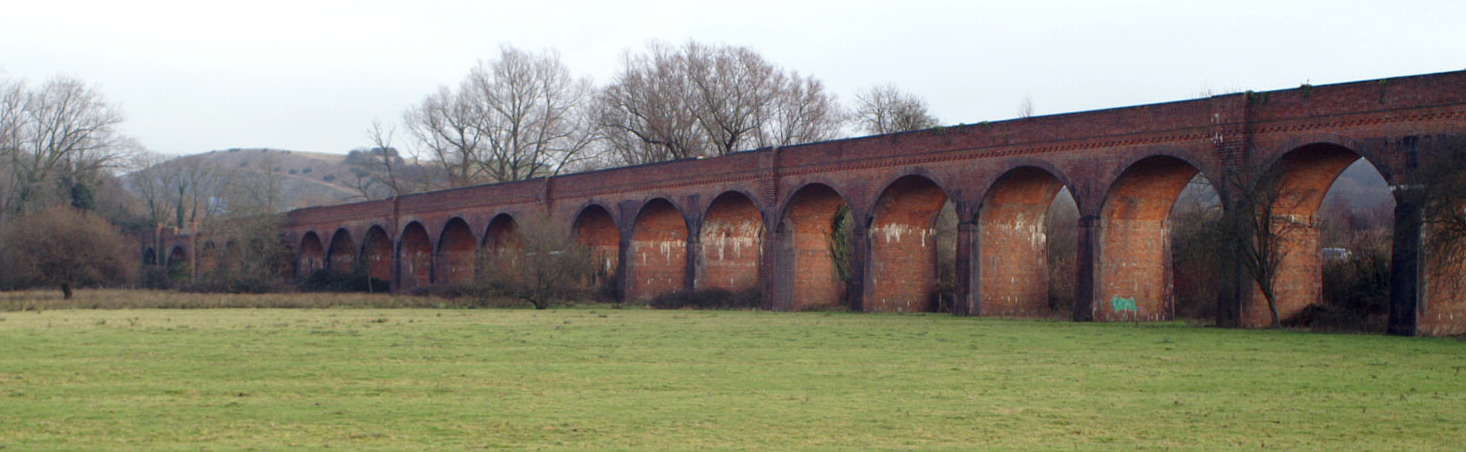
Viaduct spans, as seen in 2005

The structure has 33 spans. Although it appears to be a brick structure, the viaduct in fact has a solid concrete core in its pillars and the bricks have only an aesthetic function. The bricks came from the Poole Brickworks in Wellington, Somerset, and the blue engineering capping bricks from Blanchards at Bishop's Waltham. The brickwork is a façade, and is only one layer thick. The main part of the structure is concrete, with a core of local chalk, making it one of the earliest railway viaducts to use poured concrete. Original drawings show the concrete construction but this was only confirmed by test drilling.

The viaduct was designed by W. R. Galbraith. It is 399 yards (365 metres) long and a maximum of 35 feet (11 metres) high. The arch spanning the river has a span of 50 feet (15 metres); the other 32 are all segmental arches of 30-foot (9.1-metre) span. Some of the details are in Derbyshire gritstone. It has a dentilled (tooth-patterned) cornice and a series of refuges supported on corbels. Galbraith used concrete on several of his other viaducts but Hockley is the only survivor.

== Preservation ==
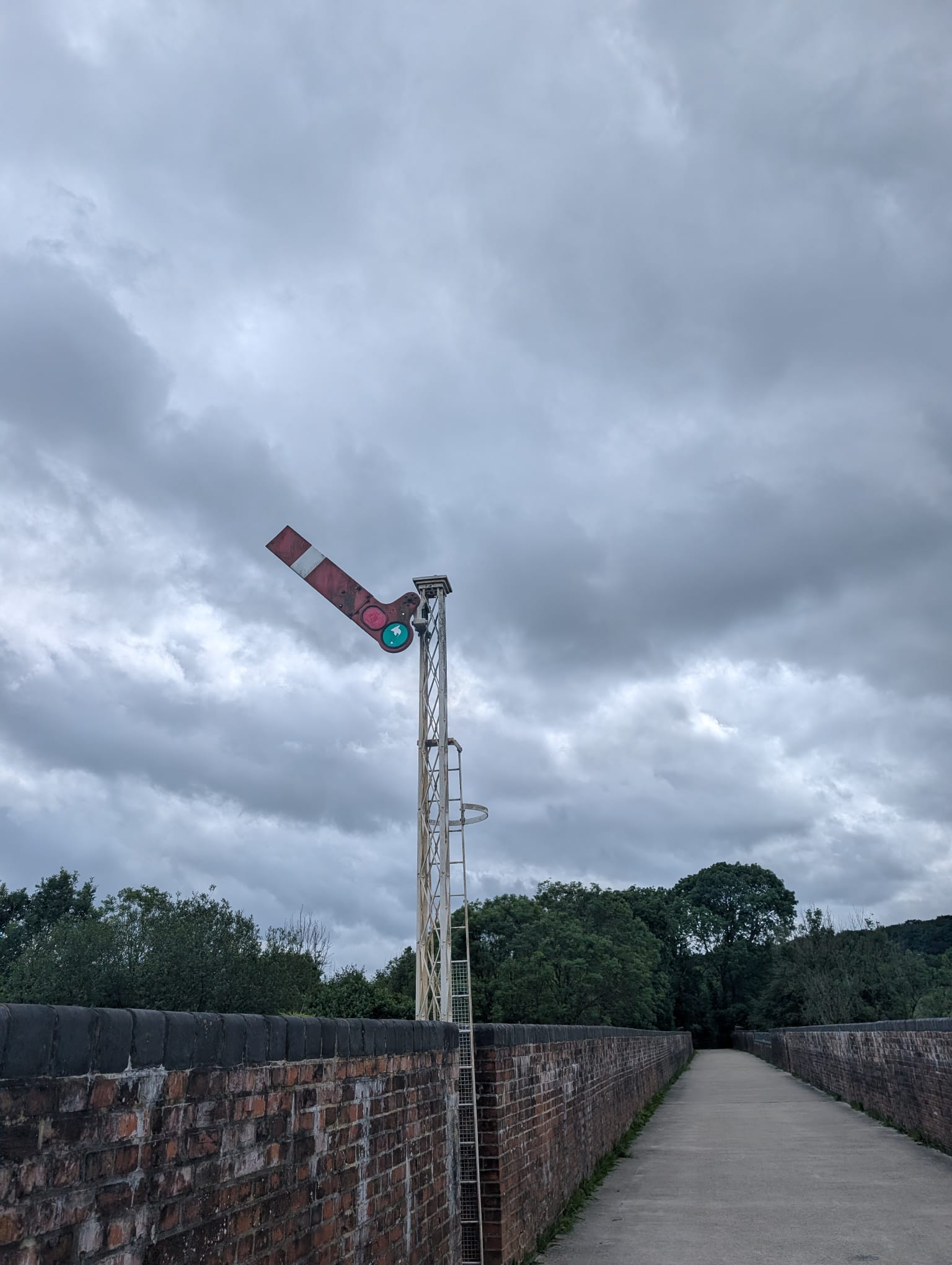
Old railway signal on the viaduct

Unsuccessful attempts have been made to have the structure listed in order to attract National Lottery funding to assist in its preservation. The structure is of some historic interest due to its method of construction, and the importance of the route in the lead up to D-Day. It also provides a footpath and cycleway across the Itchen, and acts as a partial screen between the water meadows and the elevated M3 motorway at the foot of Twyford Down. In 2007 Winchester City Council announced a £500,000 rolling programme of repairs over 12 years. However the City Council had held back on any repairs since Sustrans was interested in taking over the Viaduct as part of its Hampshire cycle route system. In March 2012 Hampshire County Council provided a further £250,000 in funding to assist in bringing the viaduct into use as part of National Cycle Route 23, running between Reading and the Isle of Wight. Restoration was undertaken by the combined expertise of Sustrans, Winchester City Council and Hampshire County Council. The Friends of Hockley Viaduct provided a replacement home signal and its lattice post, and an original nearby telegraph post has been restored and re-erected. Sustrans has signed a 40year maintenance contract with the City Council.

The restored viaduct was officially opened on 26 February 2013 by World Champion cyclist Dani King, who was born and brought up in Eastleigh. Over 100 invited guests attended a display concerning the history and restoration of the Viaduct in Winchester Guildhall before either cycling to the Viaduct alongside King or riding down to it in a King Alfred Buses double decker bus for the official opening. A red ribbon, held by Winchester Mayor Frank Pearson and former Councillor George Beckett, was breasted by King and her entourage.
