= Hockley (surname) =

Hockley is a surname. Notable people with the surname include:

- Cal Hockley (1931–2020), Canadian ice hockey player
- Debbie Hockley (born 1962), former New Zealand cricketer
- Fred Hockley (1923–1945), English fighter pilot
- George Washington Hockley (1802–1852), Texas revolutionary
- James Hockley (born 1979), English cricketer
- Matthew Hockley (born 1982), English footballer
- Wayne Hockley (born 1978), English former professional footballer

Fictional characters:

- Caledon Hockley, a fictional character in Titanic

== See also ==
- Anthony Farrar-Hockley (1924–2006), British soldier and military historian
- Dair Farrar-Hockley (born 1946), retired Major General in the British Army
