= Allbrook =

Neighbourhood and parish of Eastleigh, Hampshire, England

Coordinates: 50.9879°N 1.3468°W

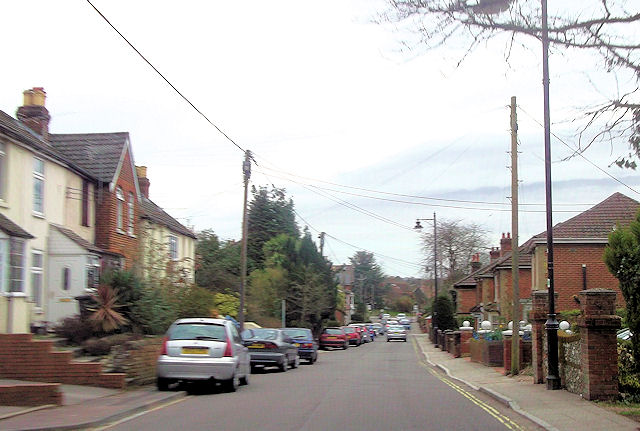

- Location within Hampshire
- Interactive map of Allbrook
- Population: 2,001 (2021 census)
- OS grid reference: SU459211
- Civil parish: Allbrook
- District: Eastleigh
- Shire county: Hampshire
- Region: South East
- Country: England
- Sovereign state: United Kingdom
- Post town: Eastleigh
- Postcode district: SO50
- Police: Hampshire and Isle of Wight
- Fire: Hampshire and Isle of Wight
- Ambulance: South Central
- UK Parliament: Eastleigh

Allbrook is a settlement and civil parish in the Eastleigh district in Hampshire, England. In 2021 the parish had a population of 2001.

== History ==
The village was originally named Albrook (with one L). Circa 1660–64 the artist Mary Beale and her family moved here from London to escape the plague.

== Governance ==
Before 1974 the area formed part of the municipal borough of Eastleigh. Under local government reorganisation, a larger Borough of Eastleigh including a number of rural parishes was created. The former borough became an unparished area.

The parish was created on 1 April 2010 as Allbrook following a Community Governance Review conducted by Eastleigh Borough Council in 2009. It was renamed Allbrook and North Boyatt on 16 December 2010

After consultation with residents the Parish name was changed to Allbrook Parish Council in 2019. This was an effort to better integrate the areas of Allbrook Village and the northern part of the Boyatt Wood estate. Before the building of the extensive housing estate in Boyatt Wood in the 1970s much of the northern part was part of the traditional Allbrook area and the designation "North Boyatt" has no historical significance.
