= Winchester (Chesil) railway station =

Former railway station in Hampshire, England

Coordinates: 51.0603°N 1.3056°W

Winchester (Chesil)
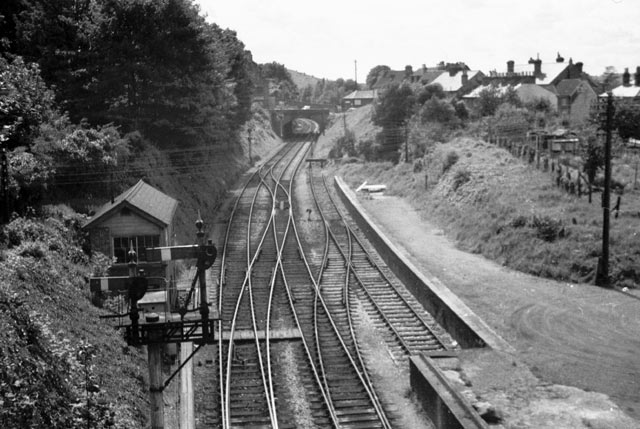
- The station in 1960.

General information
- Location: Winchester, City of Winchester; England
- Grid reference: SU487292
- Platforms: 2

Other information
- Status: Disused

History
- Original company: Didcot, Newbury and Southampton Railway
- Pre-grouping: Didcot, Newbury and Southampton Railway
- Post-grouping: Great Western Railway

Key dates
- 4 May 1885: Opened as Winchester Cheesehill
- 4 August 1942: Closed
- 8 March 1943: Reopened
- 26 September 1949: Renamed Winchester (Chesil)
- 7 March 1960: Closed
- 18 June 1960: Reopened
- 10 September 1960: Closed
- 17 June 1961: Reopened
- 9 September 1961: last train ran
Location

Winchester (Chesil) railway station served the city of Winchester, in Hampshire, England, between 1885 and 1961. It was, for the first six years after the opening of the line, the terminus of the Didcot, Newbury and Southampton Railway (DNSR), until the line was extended to link up with the Southern Railway line to Southampton. The station buildings were located on the northbound platform; they were larger than those of any other DNSR station, but were built to the standard designs used by the Great Western Railway (GWR). At its northern end, the line passed into the double tracked Chesil Tunnel. The station also included a loading bay and single siding at its southern end accessible from the northbound line.

== History ==
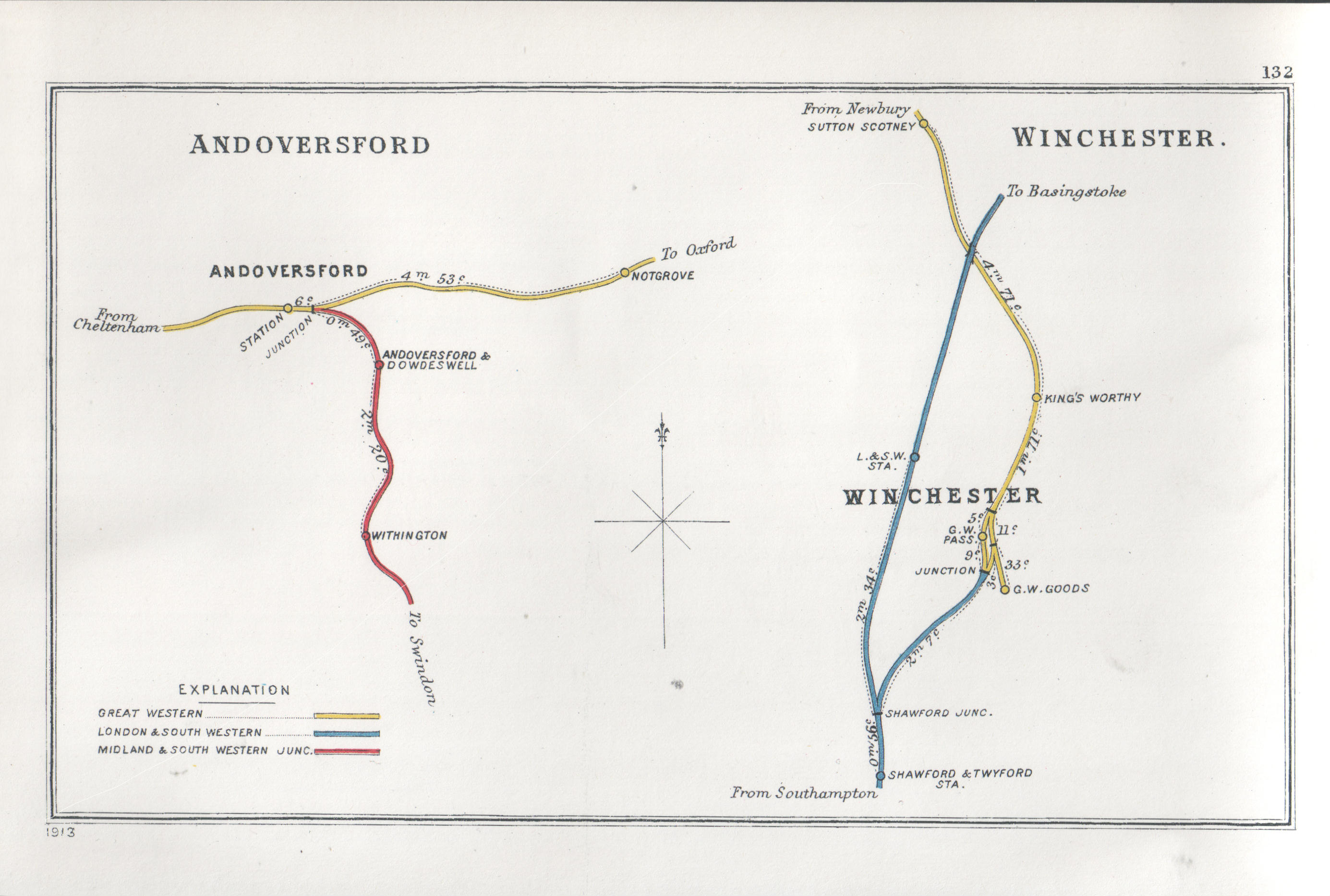
A 1913 Railway Clearing House map showing (right) railways in the vicinity of Winchester (Chesil); shown here as G.W. PASS

Originally named Winchester Cheesehill, the station was opened with the line from Newbury on 4 May 1885. Initially a terminus, since the intended line southwards to Southampton was never completed, it became a through station on 1 October 1891 when a connecting line to the London and South Western Railway (LSWR) was opened, joining the latter at Shawford Junction.

For a short period between 1918 and 1920, the station was the junction point for the Avington line, built to serve the First World War military camps in the Magdalen Hill Down and Avington Park area. This line diverged from the DNSR on the north side of Chesil Tunnel, and was worked by the Railway Operating Department of the United States Army. The line was dismantled after the end of the war removed its reason for existence.

The station closed temporarily on 4 August 1942, reopening on 8 March 1943. The station was renamed Winchester Chesil on 26 September 1949. Like the other stations on the southern part of the line, Winchester Chesil closed on 7 March 1960; however, unlike the others, it was reopened for the next two summers: 18 June 1960 to 10 September 1960 and 17 June 1961 to the last train on 9 September 1961, on Saturdays only.

Preceding station	Disused railways	Following station
King's Worthy; Line and station closed	Great Western Railway; Didcot, Newbury and Southampton Railway	Shawford; Line closed, station open

== Bar End Yard and Shed ==
Further to the south of the station was an area of extensive sidings known as the Bar End Yard. There were four sidings, two passing loops, a large goods shed and a ten-ton crane. The goods facilities were withdrawn from 4 April 1966. Stabling for two horses was located near the main gate; these animals were used to tow a freight delivery cart.

To the east of the line, adjacent to the goods shed, there was an engine shed which opened c. 1885. This was one of two which provided locomotives for DNSR services, and the only one to actually be located on the line; the other (Didcot) was on a GWR line, but Winchester was a sub-shed of Didcot. It was 83 feet (25 m) long, and 17 feet (5.2 m) wide, built of stone and brick, with a slate roof supported by a timber framework. The shed housed a single line of rails and there was a water tank above the northern end; to the south were a small coal stage and a turntable. On 31 December 1947, two GWR locomotives were based at this shed: Bulldog class 4-4-0 no. 3419, and 2251 class 0-6-0 no. 2252. It closed in July 1953.

== Signal box ==
The signal box at Chesil station was notable for the installation in 1922–23 of an early type of all-electric route-setting using a miniature lever frame in which levers corresponded to appropriate point & signal combinations rather than controlling a single piece of apparatus; the system was designed and supplied by Siemens. It lasted until around 1933 before replacement by an orthodox lever frame giving mechanical control of points and signals – it is believed that the damp conditions of the surrounding area (Chesil station lay partly in a cutting next to St. Giles Hill) caused problems with insulation of the wiring, the installation dating from a time before modern plastics like polythene and PVC were available for use in electrical insulation. The route-setting signal box was only a small scheme and effectively a testbed for a pair of similar but larger installations undertaken at Newport High Street station in South Wales, also during the 1920s.

== The site today ==
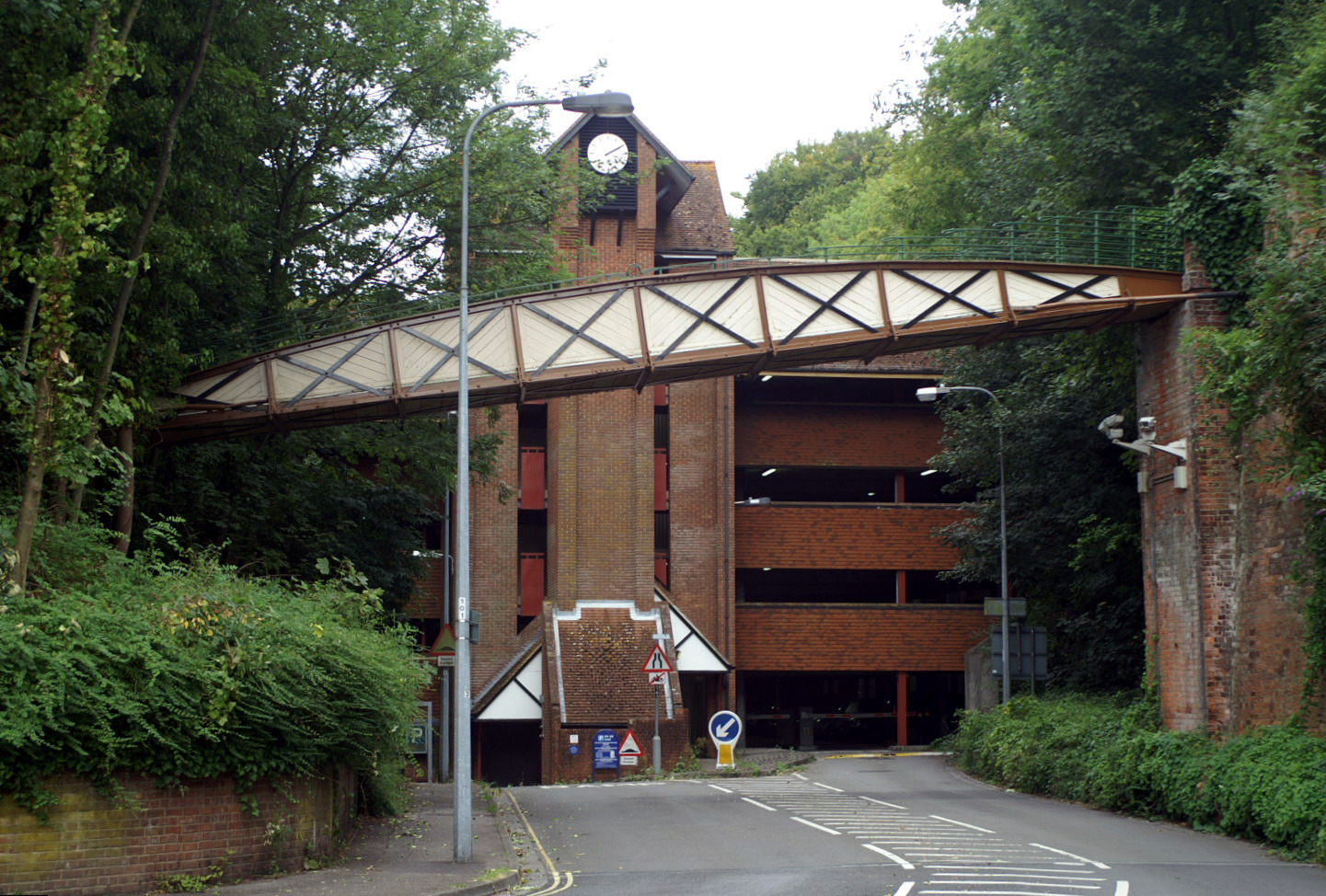
The site of the station is now occupied by a multi-storey car park

After closure, the station was demolished and the site is now a car park. The goods shed has been converted to business use.

== Gallery ==
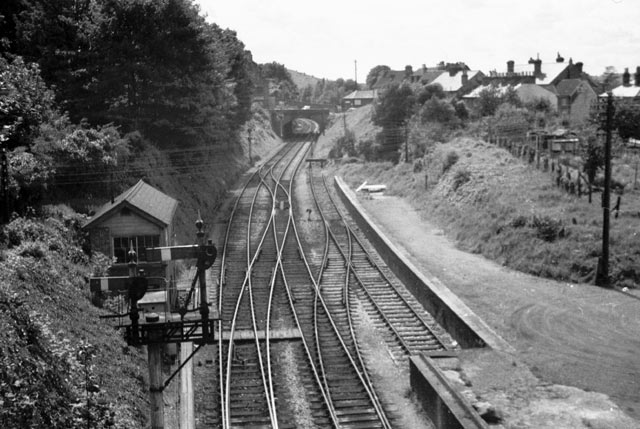
The railway near to Chesil station in August 1960

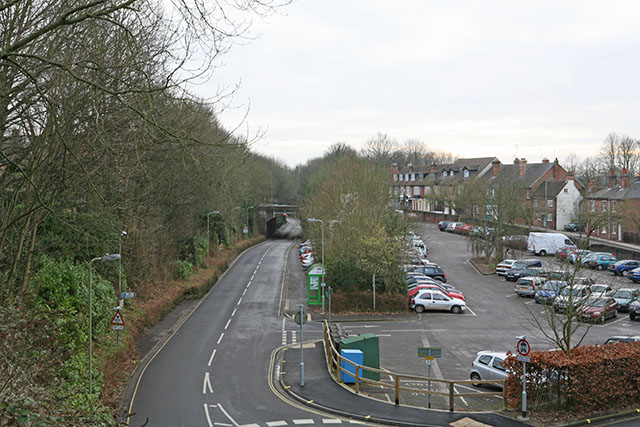
The view from the same vantage point in 2006

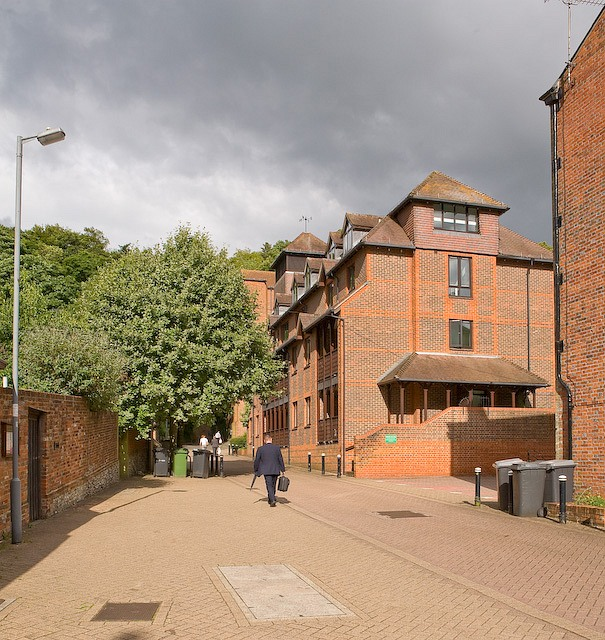
A modern view of the Old Station Approach

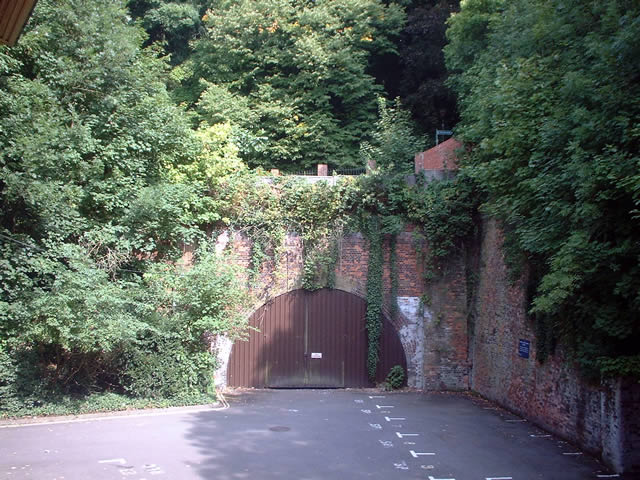
The entrance to the Chesil Tunnel still exists

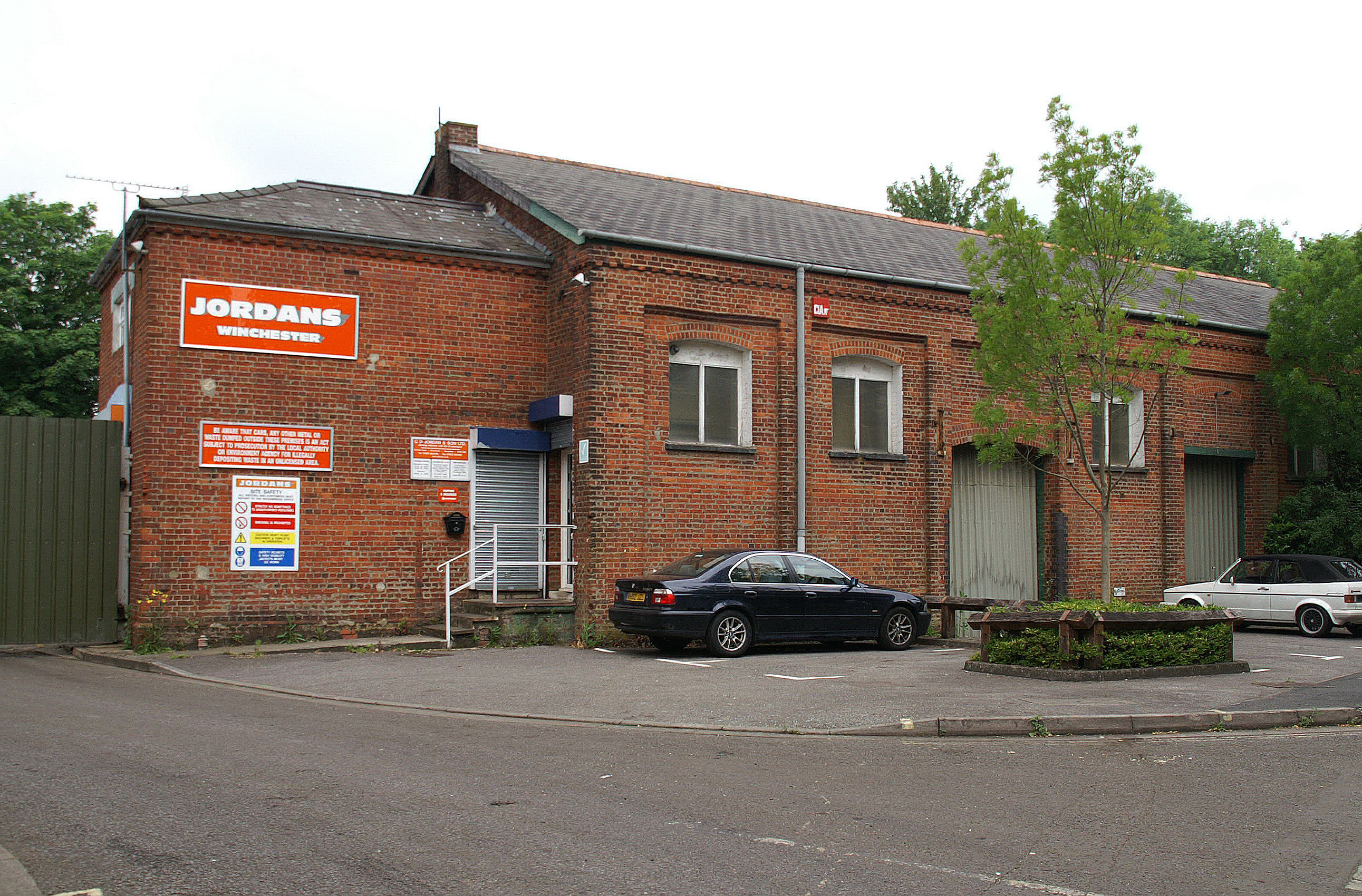
Winchester Chesil goods shed

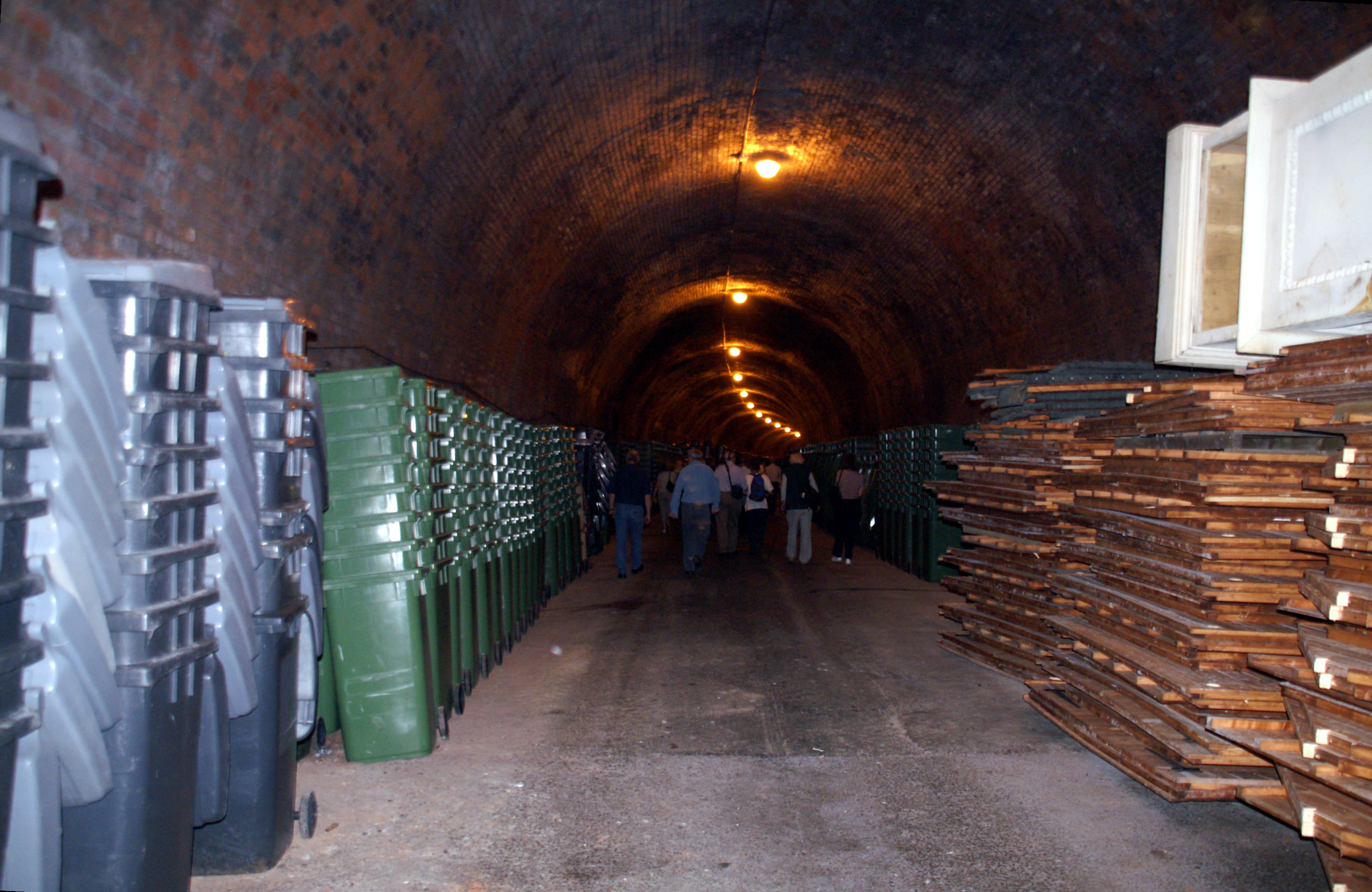
Inside Chesil Tunnel in 2007
