= Alfred the Great =

King of Wessex (871 – c. 886); King of the Anglo-Saxons (c. 886 – 899)

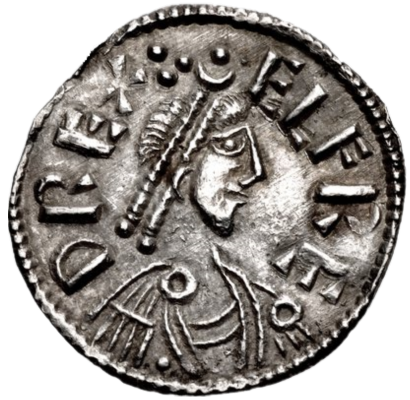
- Silver penny of Alfred, struck c. 875–880. Legend: elfre d rex

King of the West Saxons
- Reign: 23 April 871 – c. 886
- Predecessor: Æthelred I

King of the Anglo-Saxons
- Reign: c. 886 – 26 October 899
- Successor: Edward the Elder
- Born: 847–849; Wantage, Berkshire, (Note: Since 1974, Wantage has been in Oxfordshire.) Wessex
- Died: 26 October 899 (aged c. 50–52); Winchester, Hampshire, Wessex
- Burial: c. 1100; Hyde Abbey (now lost), Winchester, Hampshire, England
- Spouse: Ealhswith (m. 868)
- Issue: Æthelflæd, Lady of the Mercians; Edward the Elder; Æthelgifu, Abbess of Shaftesbury; Ælfthryth, Countess of Flanders; Æthelweard
- House: Wessex
- Father: Æthelwulf, King of Wessex
- Mother: Osburh

Alfred the Great (Old English: Ælfrǣd [ˈæɫvˌræːd]; c. 849 – 26 October 899) was King of the West Saxons from 871 to 886, and King of the Anglo-Saxons from 886 until his death in 899. He was the youngest son of King Æthelwulf and Æthelwulf's first wife Osburh, who both died when Alfred was young. Three of Alfred's brothers, Æthelbald, Æthelberht and Æthelred, reigned in turn before him. Under Alfred's rule, considerable administrative and military reforms were introduced, prompting lasting change in England.

After ascending the throne, Alfred spent several years fighting Viking invasions. He won a decisive victory at the Battle of Edington in 878 and made an agreement with the Vikings, dividing England between Anglo-Saxon territory and the Viking-ruled Danelaw, which consisted of Scandinavian York, the north-east Midlands, and East Anglia. Alfred also oversaw the conversion of the Viking leader Guthrum to Christianity. He defended his kingdom against the Viking attempt at conquest, becoming the dominant ruler in England. In 886 Alfred began styling himself "King of the Anglo-Saxons" after reoccupying London from the Vikings. Details of his life are described in a work by the 9th-century Welsh scholar and bishop Asser.

Alfred had a reputation as a learned and merciful man of a gracious and level-headed nature who encouraged education, establishing a court school for both nobles and commoners to be educated in both English and Latin, and improving the legal system and military structure and his people's quality of life. He was given the epithet "the Great" from as early as the 13th century, though it was only popularised from the 16th century. Alfred is the only native-born English monarch to be labelled as such.

== Background ==
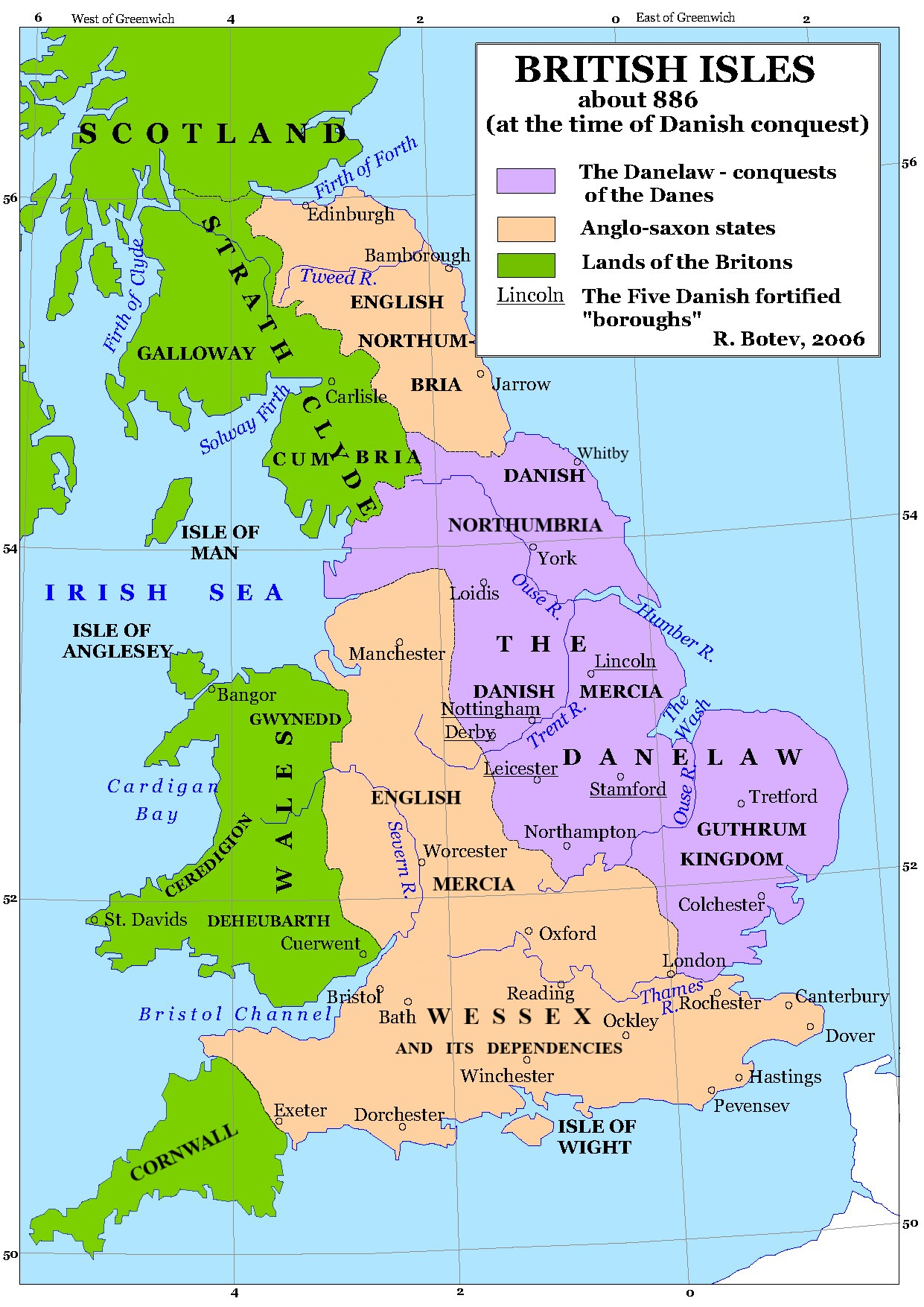
Map of Britain in 886

Alfred's grandfather Ecgberht became King of Wessex in 802, and in the view of the historian Richard Abels, it must have seemed very unlikely to contemporaries that he would establish a lasting dynasty. For 200 years, three families had fought for the West Saxon throne, and no son had followed his father as king. No ancestor of Ecgberht had been a king of Wessex since Ceawlin in the late sixth century, but he was believed to be a paternal descendant of Cerdic, the founder of the West Saxon dynasty. (Note: Historians have expressed doubt both whether the genealogy for Ecgberht going back to Cerdic was fabricated to legitimise his seizure of the West Saxon throne, and broadly whether Cerdic was a real person or if the story of Cerdic is a "foundation myth".) This made Ecgberht an ætheling – a prince eligible for the throne. But after Ecgberht's reign, descent from Cerdic was no longer sufficient to make a man an ætheling. When Ecgberht died in 839, he was succeeded by his son Æthelwulf; all subsequent West Saxon kings were descendants of Ecgberht and Æthelwulf, and were also sons of kings.

At the beginning of the ninth century, England was almost wholly under the control of the Anglo-Saxons. Mercia dominated southern England, but its supremacy came to an end in 825 when it was decisively defeated by Ecgberht at the Battle of Ellendun. Mercia and Wessex became allies, which was important in the resistance to Viking attacks. In 853, King Burgred of Mercia requested West Saxon help to suppress a Welsh rebellion, and Æthelwulf led a West Saxon contingent in a successful joint campaign. The same year, Burgred married Æthelwulf's daughter, Æthelswith.

In 825, Ecgberht sent Æthelwulf to invade the Mercian sub-kingdom of Kent, and its sub-king, Baldred, was driven out shortly afterwards. By 830, Essex, Surrey and Sussex had submitted to Ecgberht, and he had appointed Æthelwulf to rule the south-eastern territories as king of Kent. The Vikings ravaged the Isle of Sheppey in 835, and the following year they defeated Ecgberht at Carhampton in Somerset, but in 838 he was victorious over an alliance of Cornishmen and Vikings at the Battle of Hingston Down, reducing Cornwall to the status of a client kingdom. When Æthelwulf succeeded to the throne, he appointed his eldest son Æthelstan as sub-king of Kent. Ecgberht and Æthelwulf may not have intended a permanent union between Wessex and Kent because they both appointed sons as sub-kings, and charters in Wessex were attested (witnessed) by West Saxon magnates, while Kentish charters were witnessed by the Kentish elite; both kings kept overall control, and the sub-kings were not allowed to issue their own coinage.

Viking raids increased in the early 840s on both sides of the English Channel, and in 843 Æthelwulf was defeated at Carhampton. In 850, Æthelstan defeated a Danish fleet off Sandwich in the first recorded naval battle in English history. In 851, Æthelwulf and his second son, Æthelbald, defeated the Vikings at the Battle of Aclea and, according to the Anglo-Saxon Chronicle, "there made the greatest slaughter of a heathen raiding-army that we have heard tell of up to this present day, and there took the victory". Æthelwulf died in 858 and was succeeded by his oldest surviving son, Æthelbald, as king of Wessex and by his next oldest son, Æthelberht, as king of Kent. Æthelbald only survived his father by two years, and Æthelberht then for the first time united Wessex and Kent into a single kingdom.

== Childhood ==
Alfred was the youngest son of Æthelwulf, king of Wessex, and his wife Osburh. According to his biographer, Asser, writing in 893, "In the year of our Lord's Incarnation 849 Alfred, King of the Anglo-Saxons", was born at the royal estate called Wantage, in the district known as Berkshire ("which is so called from Berroc Wood, where the box tree grows very abundantly"). This date has been accepted by the editors of Asser's biography, Simon Keynes and Michael Lapidge, and by other historians such as David Dumville, Justin Pollard and Richard Huscroft. West Saxon genealogical lists state that Alfred was 23 when he became king in April 871, implying that he was born between April 847 and April 848. This dating is adopted in the biography of Alfred by Alfred Smyth, who regards Asser's biography as fraudulent, an allegation which is rejected by other historians. Richard Abels in his biography discusses both sources but does not decide between them and dates Alfred's birth as 847–49, while Patrick Wormald in his Oxford Dictionary of National Biography article dates it 848–49. Berkshire had been historically disputed between Wessex and the midland kingdom of Mercia, and as late as 844, a charter showed that it was part of Mercia, but Alfred's birth in the county is evidence that, by the late 840s, control had passed to Wessex.

He was the youngest of six children. His eldest brother, Æthelstan, was old enough to be appointed sub-king of Kent in 839, almost 10 years before Alfred was born. He died in the early 850s. Alfred's next three brothers were successively kings of Wessex. Æthelbald (858–860) and Æthelberht (860–865) were also much older than Alfred, but Æthelred (865–871) was only a year or two older. Alfred's only known sister, Æthelswith, married Burgred, King of Mercia in 853. Most historians think that Osburh was the mother of all Æthelwulf's children, but some suggest that the older ones were born to an unrecorded first wife. Osburh was descended from the rulers of the Isle of Wight. She was described by Asser as "a most religious woman, noble in character and noble by birth". She had died by 856 when Æthelwulf married Judith, daughter of Charles the Bald, King of West Francia.

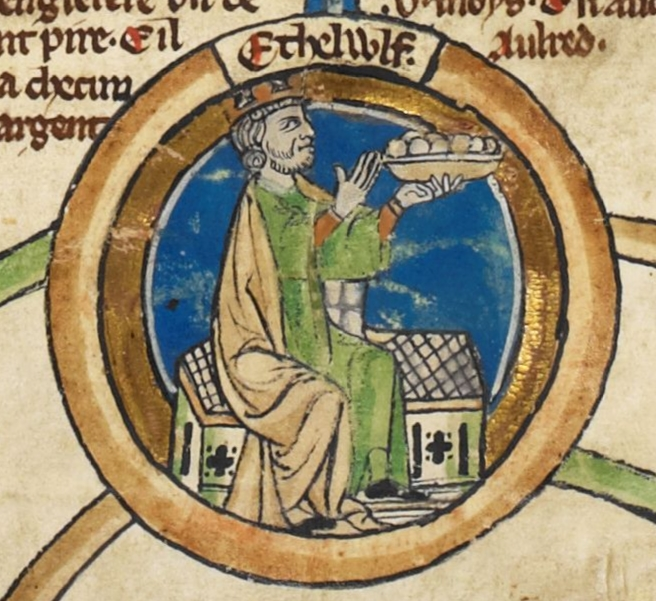
Alfred's father Æthelwulf of Wessex in the early 14th-century Genealogical Roll of the Kings of England

According to Asser, in his childhood Alfred won a beautifully decorated book of English poetry, offered as a prize by his mother to the first of her sons able to memorise it. He must have had it read to him because his mother died when he was about six and he did not learn to read until he was 12. In 853 Alfred is reported by the Anglo-Saxon Chronicle to have been sent to Rome, where he was confirmed by Pope Leo IV, who "anointed him as king". Victorian writers later interpreted this as an anticipatory coronation in preparation for his eventual succession to the throne of Wessex. This is unlikely; his succession could not have been foreseen at the time because Alfred had three living elder brothers. A letter of Leo IV shows that Alfred was made a "consul" and a misinterpretation of this investiture, deliberate or accidental, could explain later confusion. It may be based upon the fact that Alfred later accompanied his father on a pilgrimage to Rome where he spent some time at the court of Charles the Bald around 854–55. On their return from Rome in 856, Æthelwulf was deposed by his son Æthelbald. With civil war looming, the magnates of the realm met in council to form a compromise. Æthelbald retained the western shires (i.e. historical Wessex), and Æthelwulf ruled in the east, possibly as King of Kent. After Æthelwulf died in 858, Wessex was ruled by three of Alfred's brothers in succession: Æthelbald, Æthelberht and Æthelred.

== The reigns of Alfred's brothers ==
A map of the route taken by the Viking Great Heathen Army which arrived in England from Denmark, Norway and southern Sweden in 865.

Alfred is not mentioned during the short reigns of his older brothers Æthelbald and Æthelberht. The Anglo-Saxon Chronicle describes the Great Heathen Army of Danes landing in East Anglia with the intent of conquering the four kingdoms which constituted Anglo-Saxon England in 865. Alfred's public life began in 865 at age 16 with the accession of his third brother, 18-year-old Æthelred. During this period, Bishop Asser gave Alfred the unique title of secundarius, which may indicate a position similar to the Celtic tanist, a recognised successor closely associated with the reigning monarch. This arrangement may have been sanctioned by Alfred's father or by the Witan to guard against the danger of a disputed succession should Æthelred fall in battle. It was a well known tradition among other Germanic peoples – such as the Swedes and Franks to whom the Anglo-Saxons were closely related – to crown a successor as royal prince and military commander.

=== Viking invasion ===
In 868 Alfred was recorded as fighting beside Æthelred in a failed attempt to keep the Great Heathen Army led by Ivar the Boneless out of the adjoining Kingdom of Mercia. The Danes arrived in his homeland at the end of 870, and nine engagements were fought in the following year, with mixed results; the places and dates of two of these battles have not been recorded. A successful skirmish at the Battle of Englefield in Berkshire on 31 December 870 was followed by a severe defeat at the siege and the Battle of Reading by Ivar's brother Halfdan Ragnarsson on 5 January 871. Four days later, the Anglo-Saxons won a victory at the Battle of Ashdown on the Berkshire Downs, possibly near Compton or Aldworth. The Saxons were defeated at the Battle of Basing on 22 January. They were defeated again on 22 March at the Battle of Merton (perhaps Marden in Wiltshire or Martin in Dorset). Æthelred died shortly afterwards in April 871.

== King at war ==
=== Early struggles ===
In April 871, King Æthelred died and Alfred acceded to the throne of Wessex and the burden of its defence, even though Æthelred left two under-age sons, Æthelhelm and Æthelwold. This was in accordance with the agreement that Æthelred and Alfred had made earlier that year in an assembly at an unidentified place called Swinbeorg. The brothers had agreed that whichever of them outlived the other would inherit the personal property that King Æthelwulf had left jointly to his sons in his will. The deceased's sons would receive only whatever property and riches their father had settled upon them and whatever additional lands their uncle had acquired. The unstated premise was that the surviving brother would be king. Given the Danish invasion and the youth of his nephews, Alfred's accession probably went uncontested.

While he was busy with the burial ceremonies for his brother, the Danes defeated the Saxon army in his absence at an unnamed spot and then again in his presence at Wilton in May. The defeat at Wilton smashed any remaining hope that Alfred could drive the invaders from his kingdom. Alfred was forced instead to make peace with them. Although the terms of the peace are not recorded, Bishop Asser wrote that the pagans agreed to vacate the realm and made good their promise.

The Viking army withdrew from Reading in the autumn of 871 to take up winter quarters in Mercian London. Although not mentioned by Asser or by the Anglo-Saxon Chronicle, Alfred probably paid the Vikings silver to leave, much as the Mercians were to do in the following year. Hoards dating to the Viking occupation of London in 871/872 have been excavated at Croydon, Gravesend and Waterloo Bridge. These finds hint at the cost involved in making peace with the Vikings. For the next five years, the Danes occupied other parts of England.

In 876, under Guthrum, Oscetel and Anwend, the Danes slipped past the Saxon army and attacked and occupied Wareham in Dorset. Alfred blockaded them but was unable to take Wareham by assault. He negotiated a peace that involved an exchange of hostages and oaths, which the Danes swore on a "holy ring" associated with the worship of Thor. The Danes broke their word, and, after killing all the hostages, slipped away under cover of night to Exeter in Devon.

Alfred blockaded the Viking ships in Devon, and with a relief fleet having been scattered by a storm, the Danes were forced to submit. The Danes withdrew to Mercia. In January 878, the Danes made a sudden attack on Chippenham, a royal stronghold in which Alfred had been staying over Christmas "and most of the people they killed, except the King Alfred, and he with a little band made his way by wood and swamp, and after Easter he made a fort at Athelney in the marshes of Somerset, and from that fort kept fighting against the foe". Considering the fate of the Mercians' kingdom under similar Viking pressure and an analysis of charter signatories either side of the raid it has been suggested that Alfred may have fallen prey to a Witan coup at Chippenham rather than simply being surprised by a Viking attack. From his fort at Athelney, an island in the marshes near North Petherton, Alfred was able to mount a resistance campaign, rallying the local militias from Somerset, Wiltshire and Hampshire. 878 was the nadir of the history of the Anglo-Saxon kingdoms. With all the other kingdoms having fallen to the Vikings, Wessex alone was resisting.

=== Legend of burnt cake ===
Having fled to the Somerset Levels, Alfred was purportedly given shelter by a peasant woman who, unaware of his identity, asked him to mind some wheaten cakes she left baking by the fire. Preoccupied with the problems of his kingdom, Alfred accidentally let the cakes burn, and was roundly scolded by the woman upon her return. The first written account of the legend appears a century after Alfred's death, though it may have earlier origins in folklore.

=== Counter-attack and victory ===
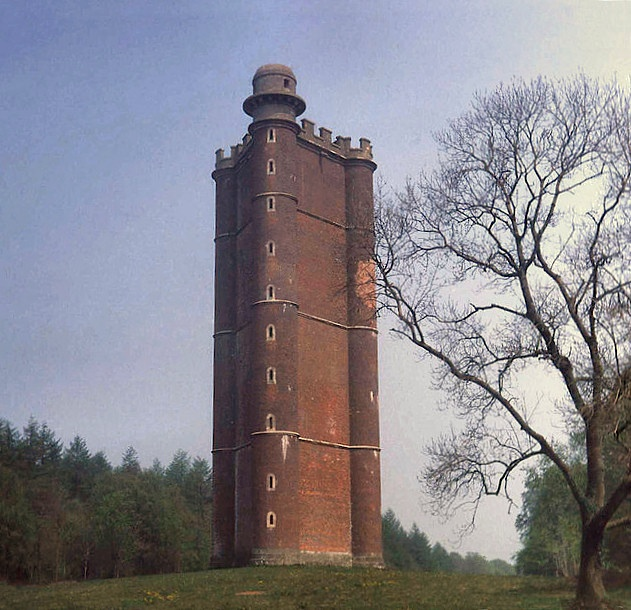
King Alfred's Tower (1772) in Somerset, on the supposed site of Egbert's Stone, the mustering place before the Battle of Edington (Note: The inscription reads "ALFRED THE GREAT AD 879 on this Summit Erected his Standard Against Danish Invaders To him We owe The Origin of Juries The Establishment of a Militia The Creation of a Naval Force ALFRED The Light of a Benighted Age Was a Philosopher and a Christian The Father of his People The Founder of the English MONARCHY and LIBERTY".)

In the seventh week after Easter (4–10 May 878), around Whitsuntide, Alfred rode to Egbert's Stone east of Selwood where he was met by "all the people of Somerset and of Wiltshire and of that part of Hampshire which is on this side of the sea (that is, west of Southampton Water), and they rejoiced to see him". Alfred's emergence from his marshland stronghold was part of a carefully planned offensive that entailed raising the fyrds of three shires. This meant not only that the king had retained the loyalty of ealdormen, royal reeves and king's thegns, who were charged with levying and leading these forces, but that they had maintained their positions of authority in these localities well enough to answer his summons to war. Alfred's actions also suggest a system of scouts and messengers.

Alfred won a decisive victory in the ensuing Battle of Edington which may have been fought near Westbury, Wiltshire. He then pursued the Danes to their stronghold at Chippenham and starved them into submission. One of the terms of the surrender was that Guthrum convert to Christianity. Three weeks later, the Danish king and 29 of his chief men were baptised at Alfred's court at Aller, near Athelney, with Alfred receiving Guthrum as his spiritual son.

According to Asser,

The unbinding of the chrisom (Note: A chrisom was the face-cloth or piece of linen laid over a child's head when he or she was baptised or christened. Originally the purpose of the chrisom-cloth was to keep the chrism, a consecrated oil, from accidentally rubbing off.) on the eighth day took place at a royal estate called Wedmore.

— Keynes & Lapidge 1983, Ch. 56

At Wedmore, Alfred and Guthrum negotiated what some historians have called the Treaty of Wedmore, but it was to be some years after the cessation of hostilities that a formal treaty was signed. Under the terms of the so-called Treaty of Wedmore, the converted Guthrum was required to leave Wessex and return to East Anglia. Consequently, in 879 the Viking army left Chippenham and made its way to Cirencester. The formal Treaty of Alfred and Guthrum, preserved in Old English in Corpus Christi College, Cambridge (Manuscript 383), and in a Latin compilation known as Quadripartitus, was negotiated later, perhaps in 879 or 880, when King Ceolwulf II of Mercia was deposed.

That treaty divided up the kingdom of Mercia. By its terms, the boundary between Alfred's and Guthrum's kingdoms was to run up the River Thames to the River Lea, follow the Lea to its source (near Luton), from there extend in a straight line to Bedford, and from Bedford follow the River Ouse to Watling Street.

Alfred succeeded to Ceolwulf's kingdom consisting of western Mercia, and Guthrum incorporated the eastern part of Mercia into an enlarged Kingdom of East Anglia (henceforward known as the Danelaw). By terms of the treaty, moreover, Alfred was to have control over the Mercian city of London and its mints—at least for the time being. In 825, the Anglo-Saxon Chronicle had recorded that the people of Essex, Sussex, Kent and Surrey surrendered to Egbert, Alfred's grandfather. From then until the arrival of the Great Heathen Army, Essex had formed part of Wessex. After the foundation of Danelaw, it appears that some of Essex would have been ceded to the Danes, but how much is not clear.

=== 880s ===
With the signing of the Treaty of Alfred and Guthrum, an event most commonly held to have taken place around 880 when Guthrum's people began settling East Anglia, Guthrum was neutralised as a threat. The Viking army, which had stayed at Fulham during the winter of 878–79, sailed for Ghent and was active on the continent from 879 to 892.

There were local raids on the coast of Wessex throughout the 880s. In 882 Alfred fought a small sea battle against four Danish ships. Two of the ships were destroyed, and the others surrendered. This was one of four sea battles recorded in the Anglo-Saxon Chronicle, three of which involved Alfred. Similar small skirmishes with independent Viking raiders would have occurred for much of the period as they had for decades.

In 883 Pope Marinus I exempted the Saxon quarter in Rome from taxation, probably in return for Alfred's promise to send alms annually to Rome, which may be the origin of the medieval tax called Peter's Pence. The pope sent gifts to Alfred, including what was reputed to be a piece of the True Cross.

After the signing of the treaty with Guthrum, Alfred was spared any large-scale conflicts for some time. Despite this relative peace, the King was forced to deal with a number of Danish raids and incursions. Among these was a raid in Kent, an allied kingdom in South East England, during the year 885, which was possibly the largest raid since the battles with Guthrum. Asser's account of the raid places the Danish raiders at the Saxon city of Rochester, where they built a temporary fortress in order to besiege the city. In response to this incursion, Alfred led an Anglo-Saxon force against the Danes who, instead of engaging the army of Wessex, fled to their beached ships and sailed to another part of Britain. The retreating Danish force supposedly left Britain the following summer.

Not long after the failed Danish raid in Kent, Alfred dispatched his fleet to East Anglia. The purpose of this expedition is debated, but Asser claims that it was for the sake of plunder. After travelling up the River Stour, the fleet met Danish vessels that numbered 13 or 16 (sources vary on the number), and a battle ensued. The Anglo-Saxon fleet emerged victorious, and as Henry of Huntingdon writes, "laden with spoils". The victorious fleet was surprised when attempting to leave the River Stour and was attacked by a Danish force at the mouth of the river. The Danish fleet defeated Alfred's fleet, which may have been weakened in the previous engagement.

=== King of the Anglo-Saxons ===
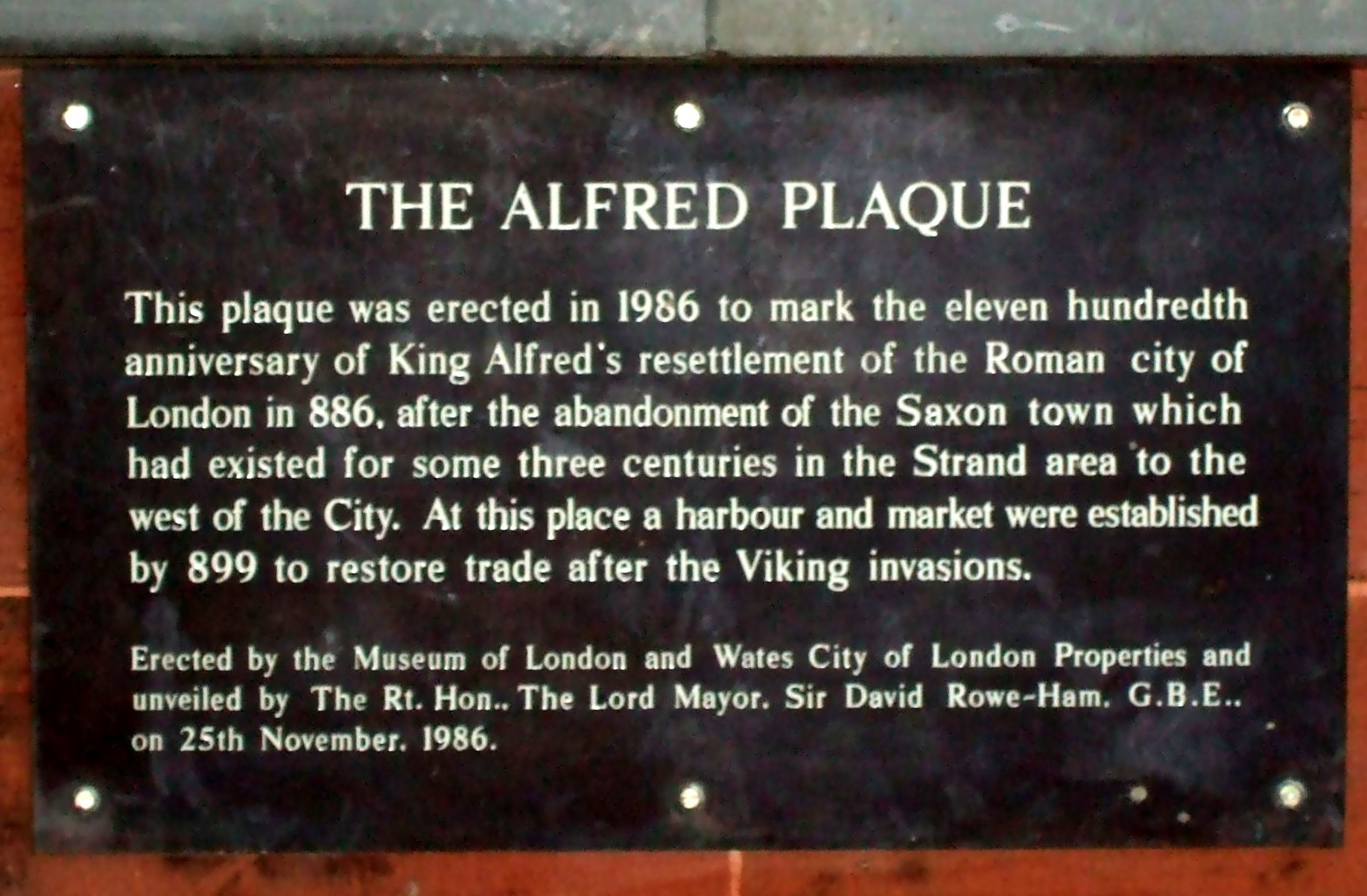
A plaque in the City of London noting the restoration of the Roman walled city by Alfred

In or shortly before 883, Æthelred, the ruler of western Mercia, submitted to Alfred's rule and before 888 married his daughter Æthelflæd. Alfred was now overlord of all Anglo-Saxons not under Danish rule, and in the mid-880s he changed his title from king of the West Saxons to king of the Anglo-Saxons. In 886 Alfred occupied and restored the Mercian town of London and entrusted it to be governed by Æthelred. The restoration of London progressed through the latter half of the 880s and probably revolved around a new street plan, adding additional fortifications to the existing Roman walls; and possibly the construction of matching fortifications on the south bank of the River Thames. Guthrum died in 890.

=== Viking attacks (890s) ===
After another lull, in the autumn of 892 or 893, the Danes attacked again. Finding their position in mainland Europe precarious, they crossed to England in 330 ships in two divisions. They entrenched themselves, the larger body at Appledore, Kent, and the lesser under Hastein, at Milton, also in Kent. The invaders brought their wives and children with them, indicating a meaningful attempt at conquest and colonisation. Alfred, in 893 or 894, took up a position from which he could observe both forces.

While he was in talks with Hastein, the Danes at Appledore broke out and struck north-westwards. They were overtaken by Alfred's eldest son Edward, and were defeated at the Battle of Farnham in Surrey. They took refuge on an island at Thorney, on the River Colne between Buckinghamshire and Middlesex, where they were blockaded and forced to give hostages and promise to leave Wessex. They then went to Essex and after suffering another defeat at Benfleet, joined with Hastein's force at Shoebury.

Alfred had been on his way to relieve his son at Thorney when he heard that the Northumbrian and East Anglian Danes were besieging Exeter and an unnamed stronghold on the North Devon shore. Alfred at once hurried westward and raised the Siege of Exeter. The fate of the other place is not recorded.

The force under Hastein set out to march up the Thames Valley, possibly with the idea of assisting their friends in the west. They were met by a large force under the three great ealdormen of Mercia, Wiltshire and Somerset and forced to head off to the north-west, being finally overtaken and blockaded at Buttington. (Some identify this with Buttington Tump at the mouth of the River Wye, others with Buttington near Welshpool.) An attempt to break through the English lines failed. Those who escaped retreated to Shoebury. After collecting reinforcements, they made a sudden dash across England and occupied the ruined Roman walls of Chester. The English did not attempt a winter blockade but contented themselves with destroying all the supplies in the district.

Early in 894 or 895 lack of food obliged the Danes to retire once more to Essex. At the end of the year, the Danes drew their ships up the River Thames and the River Lea and fortified themselves twenty miles (32 km) north of London. A frontal attack on the Danish lines failed but later in the year, Alfred saw a means of obstructing the river to prevent the egress of the Danish ships. The Danes realised that they were outmanoeuvred, struck off north-westwards and wintered at Cwatbridge near Bridgnorth. The next year, 896 (or 897), they gave up the struggle. Some retired to Northumbria, some to East Anglia. Those who had no connections in England returned to the continent.

== Military reorganisation ==
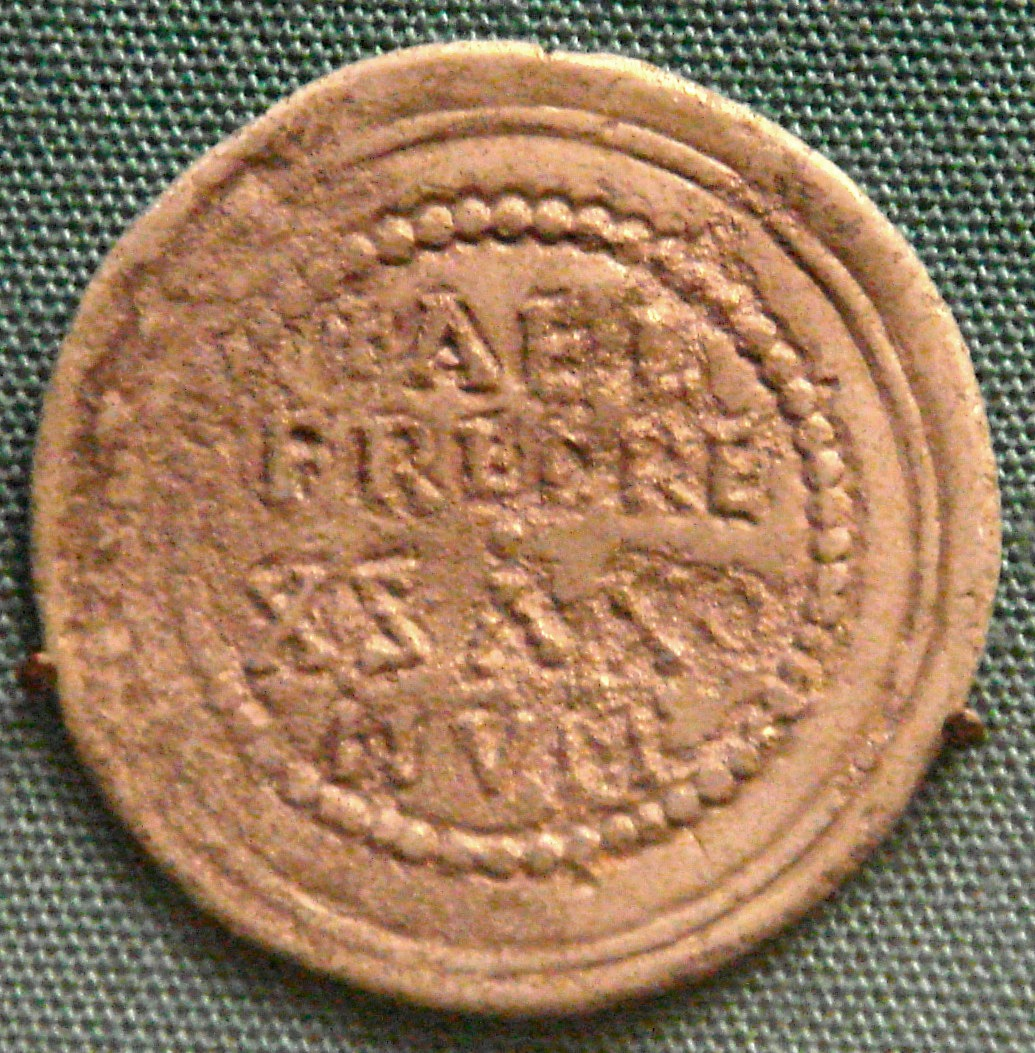
Alfred the Great silver offering penny, 871–99. Legend: AELFRED REX SAXONUM ('Alfred King of the Saxons')

The Germanic tribes who invaded Britain in the fifth and sixth centuries relied upon the unarmoured infantry supplied by their tribal levy, or fyrd, and it was upon this system that the military power of the several kingdoms of early Anglo-Saxon England depended. The fyrd was a local militia in the Anglo-Saxon shire in which all freemen had to serve; those who refused military service were subject to fines or loss of their land. According to the law code of King Ine of Wessex, issued in c. 694:

If a nobleman who holds land neglects military service, he shall pay 120 shillings and forfeit his land; a nobleman who holds no land shall pay 60 shillings; a commoner shall pay a fine of 30 shillings for neglecting military service

— Attenborough 1974, pp. 52–53

Wessex's history of failures preceding Alfred's success in 878 emphasised to him that the traditional system of battle he had inherited played to the Danes' advantage. While the Anglo-Saxons and the Danes attacked settlements for plunder, they employed different tactics. In their raids the Anglo-Saxons traditionally preferred to attack head-on by assembling their forces in a shield wall, advancing against their target and overcoming the oncoming wall marshalled against them in defence. The Danes preferred to choose easy targets, mapping cautious forays to avoid risking their plunder with high-stake attacks for more. Alfred determined their tactic was to launch small attacks from a secure base to which they could retreat should their raiders meet strong resistance.

The bases were prepared in advance, often by capturing an estate and augmenting its defences with ditches, ramparts and palisades. Once inside the fortification, Alfred realised, the Danes enjoyed the advantage, better situated to outlast their opponents or crush them with a counter-attack because the provisions and stamina of the besieging forces waned.

The means by which the Anglo-Saxons marshalled forces to defend against marauders also left them vulnerable to the Vikings. It was the responsibility of the shire fyrd to deal with local raids. The king could call up the national militia to defend the kingdom but in the case of the Viking raids, problems with communication and raising supplies meant that the national militia could not be mustered quickly enough. It was only after the raids had begun that a call went out to landowners to gather their men for battle. Large regions could be devastated before the fyrd could assemble and arrive. Although the landowners were obliged to the king to supply these men when called, during the attacks in 878 many of them abandoned their king and collaborated with Guthrum.

With these lessons in mind Alfred capitalised on the relatively peaceful years following his victory at Edington with an ambitious restructuring of Saxon defences. On a trip to Rome, Alfred had stayed with Charles the Bald, and it is possible that he may have studied how the Carolingian kings had dealt with Viking raiders. Learning from their experiences he was able to establish a system of taxation and defence for Wessex. There had been a system of fortifications in pre-Viking Mercia that may have been an influence. When the Viking raids resumed in 892 Alfred was better prepared to confront them with a standing, mobile field army, a network of garrisons and a small fleet of ships navigating the rivers and estuaries.

=== Administration and taxation ===
Tenants in Anglo-Saxon England had a threefold obligation based on their landholding: the so-called "common burdens" of military service, fortress work, and bridge repair. This threefold obligation has traditionally been called trinoda necessitas or trimoda necessitas. The Old English name for the fine due for neglecting military service was fierdwite. To maintain the burhs, and to reorganise the fyrd as a standing army, Alfred expanded the tax and conscription system based on the productivity of a tenant's landholding. The hide was the basic unit of the system on which the tenant's public obligations were assessed. A hide is thought to represent the amount of land required to support one family. The hide differed in size according to the value and resources of the land and the landowner would have to provide service based on how many hides he owned.

=== Burghal system ===
A map of burhs named in the Burghal Hidage

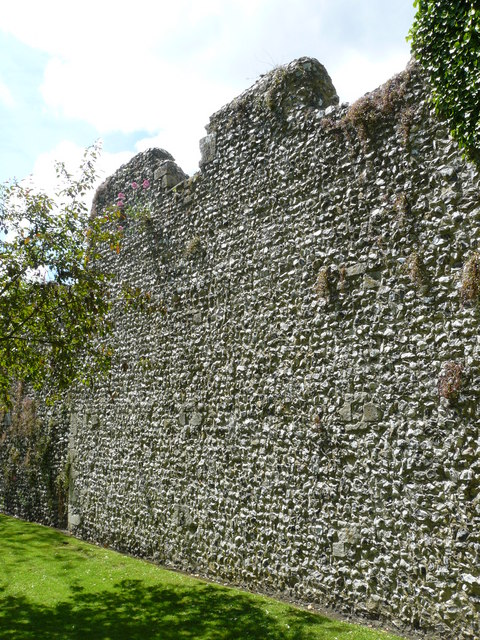
The walled defence round a burh. The City Walls of Alfred's capital, Winchester. Saxon and medieval work on Roman foundations.

The foundation of Alfred's new military defence system was a network of burhs, distributed at tactical points throughout the kingdom. There were thirty-three burhs, about 30 kilometres (19 miles) apart, enabling the military to confront attacks anywhere in the kingdom within a day.

Alfred's burhs (of which 22 developed into boroughs) ranged from former Roman towns, such as Winchester, where the stone walls were repaired and ditches added, to massive earthen walls surrounded by wide ditches, probably reinforced with wooden revetments and palisades, such as at Burpham in West Sussex. (Note: The Alfredian burh represented a stage in the evolution of English medieval towns and boroughs. Of the twenty two burhs that became boroughs three did not attain full town status.) The size of the burhs ranged from tiny outposts such as Pilton in Devon, to large fortifications in established towns, the largest being at Winchester.

A document now known as the Burghal Hidage provides an insight into how the system worked. It lists the hidage for each of the fortified towns contained in the document. Wallingford had a hidage of 2,400, which meant that the landowners there were responsible for supplying and feeding 2,400 men, the number sufficient for maintaining 9,900 feet (1.88 miles; 3.0 kilometres) of wall. A total of 27,071 soldiers were needed, approximately one in four of all the free men in Wessex. Many of the burhs were twin towns that straddled a river and were connected by a fortified bridge, like those built by Charles the Bald a generation before. The double-burh blocked passage on the river, forcing Viking ships to navigate under a garrisoned bridge lined with men armed with stones, spears or arrows. Other burhs were sited near fortified royal villas, allowing the king better control over his strongholds.

The burhs were connected by a road system maintained for army use (known as herepaths). The roads allowed an army quickly to be assembled, sometimes from more than one burh, to confront the Viking invader. The road network posed significant obstacles to Viking invaders, especially those laden with booty. The system threatened Viking routes and communications making it far more dangerous for them. The Vikings lacked the equipment for a siege against a burh and a developed doctrine of siegecraft, having tailored their methods of fighting to rapid strikes and unimpeded retreats to well-defended fortifications. The only means left to them was to starve the burh into submission but this gave the king time to send his field army or garrisons from neighbouring burhs along the army roads. In such cases, the Vikings were extremely vulnerable to pursuit by the king's joint military forces. Alfred's burh system posed such a formidable challenge against Viking attack that when the Vikings returned in 892 and stormed a half-built, poorly garrisoned fortress up the Lympne estuary in Kent, the Anglo-Saxons were able to limit their penetration to the outer frontiers of Wessex and Mercia. Alfred's burghal system was revolutionary in its strategic conception and potentially expensive in its execution. His contemporary biographer Asser wrote that many nobles balked at the demands placed upon them even though they were for "the common needs of the kingdom".

=== English navy ===
Alfred also tried his hand at naval design. In 896 he ordered the construction of a small fleet, perhaps a dozen or so longships that, at 60 oars, were twice the size of Viking warships. This was not, as the Victorians asserted, the birth of the English Navy. Wessex had possessed a royal fleet before this. Alfred's older brother sub-king Æthelstan of Kent and Ealdorman Ealhhere had defeated a Viking fleet in 851 capturing nine ships and Alfred had conducted naval actions in 882. The year 897 marked an important development in the naval power of Wessex. The author of the Anglo-Saxon Chronicle related that Alfred's ships were larger, swifter, steadier and rode higher in the water than either Danish or Frisian ships. It is probable that, under the classical tutelage of Asser, Alfred used the design of Greek and Roman warships, with high sides, designed for fighting rather than for navigation.

Alfred had seapower in mind; if he could intercept raiding fleets before they landed, he could spare his kingdom from being ravaged. Alfred's ships may have been superior in conception, but in practice they proved to be too large to manoeuvre well in the close waters of estuaries and rivers, the only places in which a naval battle could be fought. The warships of the time were not designed to be ship killers but rather troop carriers. It has been suggested that, like sea battles in late Viking age Scandinavia, these battles may have entailed a ship coming alongside an opposing vessel, lashing the two ships together and then boarding the craft. The result was a land battle involving hand-to-hand fighting on board the two lashed vessels.

In the one recorded naval engagement in 896, Alfred's new fleet of nine ships intercepted six Viking ships at the mouth of an unidentified river in the south of England. The Danes had beached half their ships and gone inland. Alfred's ships immediately moved to block their escape. The three Viking ships afloat attempted to break through the English lines. Only one made it; Alfred's ships intercepted the other two. Lashing the Viking boats to their own, the English crew boarded and proceeded to kill the Vikings. One ship escaped because Alfred's heavy ships became grounded when the tide went out. A land battle ensued between the crews. The Danes were heavily outnumbered, but as the tide rose, they returned to their boats which, with shallower drafts, were freed first. The English watched as the Vikings rowed past them but they suffered so many casualties (120 dead against 62 Frisians and English) that they had difficulty putting out to sea. All were too damaged to row around Sussex, and two were driven against the Sussex coast (possibly at Selsey Bill). The shipwrecked crew were brought before Alfred at Winchester and hanged.

== Legal reform ==
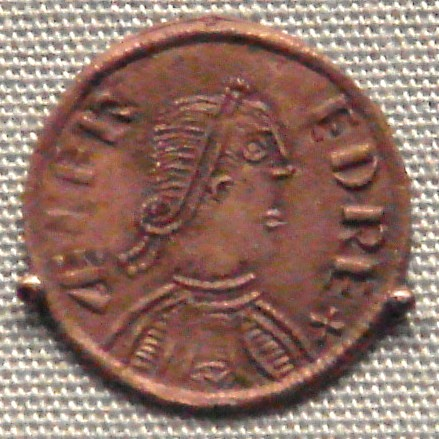
A coin of Alfred, London, 880 (based upon a Roman model)

In the late 880s or early 890s, Alfred issued a long domboc or law code consisting of his own laws, followed by a code issued by his late seventh-century predecessor King Ine of Wessex. Together these laws are arranged into 120 chapters. In his introduction Alfred explains that he gathered together the laws he found in many "synod-books" and "ordered to be written many of the ones that our forefathers observed—those that pleased me; and many of the ones that did not please me, I rejected with the advice of my councillors, and commanded them to be observed in a different way".

Alfred singled out in particular the laws that he "found in the days of Ine, my kinsman, or Offa, king of the Mercians, or King Æthelberht of Kent who first among the English people received baptism". He appended, rather than integrated, the laws of Ine into his code and although he included, as had Æthelbert, a scale of payments in compensation for injuries to various body parts, the two injury tariffs are not aligned. Offa is not known to have issued a law code, leading historian Patrick Wormald to speculate that Alfred had in mind the legatine capitulary of 786 that was presented to Offa by the papal legate George of Ostia.

About a fifth of the law code is taken up by Alfred's introduction which includes translations into English of the Ten Commandments, a few chapters from the Book of Exodus, and the Apostolic Letter from the Acts of the Apostles (15:23–29). The introduction may best be understood as Alfred's meditation upon the meaning of Christian law. It traces the continuity between God's gift of law to Moses to Alfred's own issuance of law to the West Saxon people. By doing so, it linked the holy past to the historical present and represented Alfred's law-giving as a type of divine legislation.

Similarly Alfred divided his code into 120 chapters because 120 was the age at which Moses died and, in the number-symbolism of early medieval biblical exegetes, 120 stood for law. The link between Mosaic law and Alfred's code is the Apostolic Letter which explained that Christ "had come not to shatter or annul the commandments but to fulfill them; and he taught mercy and meekness" (Intro, 49.1). The mercy that Christ infused into Mosaic law underlies the injury tariffs that figure so prominently in barbarian law codes since Christian synods "established, through that mercy which Christ taught, that for almost every misdeed at the first offence secular lords might with their permission receive without sin the monetary compensation which they then fixed".

The only crime that could not be compensated with a payment of money was treachery to a lord "since Almighty God adjudged none for those who despised Him, nor did Christ, the Son of God, adjudge any for the one who betrayed Him to death; and He commanded everyone to love his lord as Himself". Alfred's transformation of Christ's commandment, from "Love your neighbour as yourself" (Matt. 22:39–40) to love your secular lord as you would love the Lord Christ himself, underscores the importance that Alfred placed upon lordship which he understood as a sacred bond instituted by God for the governance of man.

When one turns from the domboc's introduction to the laws themselves, it is difficult to uncover any logical arrangement. The impression is of a hodgepodge of miscellaneous laws. The law code, as it has been preserved, is singularly unsuitable for use in lawsuits. In fact, several of Alfred's laws contradicted the laws of Ine that form an integral part of the code. Patrick Wormald's explanation is that Alfred's law code should be understood not as a legal manual but as an ideological manifesto of kingship "designed more for symbolic impact than for practical direction". In practical terms the most important law in the code may well have been the first: "We enjoin, what is most necessary, that each man keep carefully his oath and his pledge" which expresses a fundamental tenet of Anglo-Saxon law.

Alfred devoted considerable attention and thought to judicial matters. Asser underscores his concern for judicial fairness. Alfred, according to Asser, insisted upon reviewing contested judgments made by his ealdormen and reeves and "would carefully look into nearly all the judgements which were passed [issued] in his absence anywhere in the realm to see whether they were just or unjust". A charter from the reign of his son Edward the Elder depicts Alfred as hearing one such appeal in his chamber while washing his hands.

Asser represents Alfred as a Solomonic judge, painstaking in his own judicial investigations and critical of royal officials who rendered unjust or unwise judgments. Although Asser never mentions Alfred's law code he does say that Alfred insisted that his judges be literate so that they could apply themselves "to the pursuit of wisdom". The failure to comply with this royal order was to be punished by loss of office.

The Anglo-Saxon Chronicle, commissioned at the time of Alfred, was probably written to promote unification of England, whereas Asser's The Life of King Alfred promoted Alfred's achievements and personal qualities. It was possible that the document was designed this way so that it could be disseminated in Wales because Alfred had acquired overlordship of that country.

== Foreign relations ==
Asser speaks grandiosely of Alfred's relations with foreign powers but little definite information is available. His interest in foreign countries is shown by the insertions which he made in his translation of Orosius. He corresponded with Elias III, the patriarch of Jerusalem, and embassies to Rome conveying the English alms to the pope were fairly frequent. (Note: Some versions of the Anglo-Saxon Chronicle reported that Alfred sent a delegation to India, although this could just mean western Asia, as other versions say "Iudea". However, see Green (2019) which evidences rich links between Early Medieval Europe and India.) Around 890, Wulfstan of Hedeby undertook a journey from Hedeby on Jutland along the Baltic Sea to the Prussian trading town of Truso. Alfred personally collected details of this trip.

Alfred's relations with the Celtic princes in the western half of Great Britain are clearer. Comparatively early in his reign, according to Asser, the southern Welsh princes, owing to the pressure on them from North Wales and Mercia, commended themselves to Alfred. Later in his reign, the North Welsh followed their example and the latter cooperated with the English in the campaign of 893 (or 894). That Alfred sent alms to Irish and Continental monasteries may be taken on Asser's authority. The visit of three pilgrim "Scots" (i.e., Irish) to Alfred in 891 is undoubtedly authentic. The story that, in his childhood, he was sent to Ireland to be healed by Saint Modwenna may show Alfred's interest in that island.

== Religion, education and culture ==
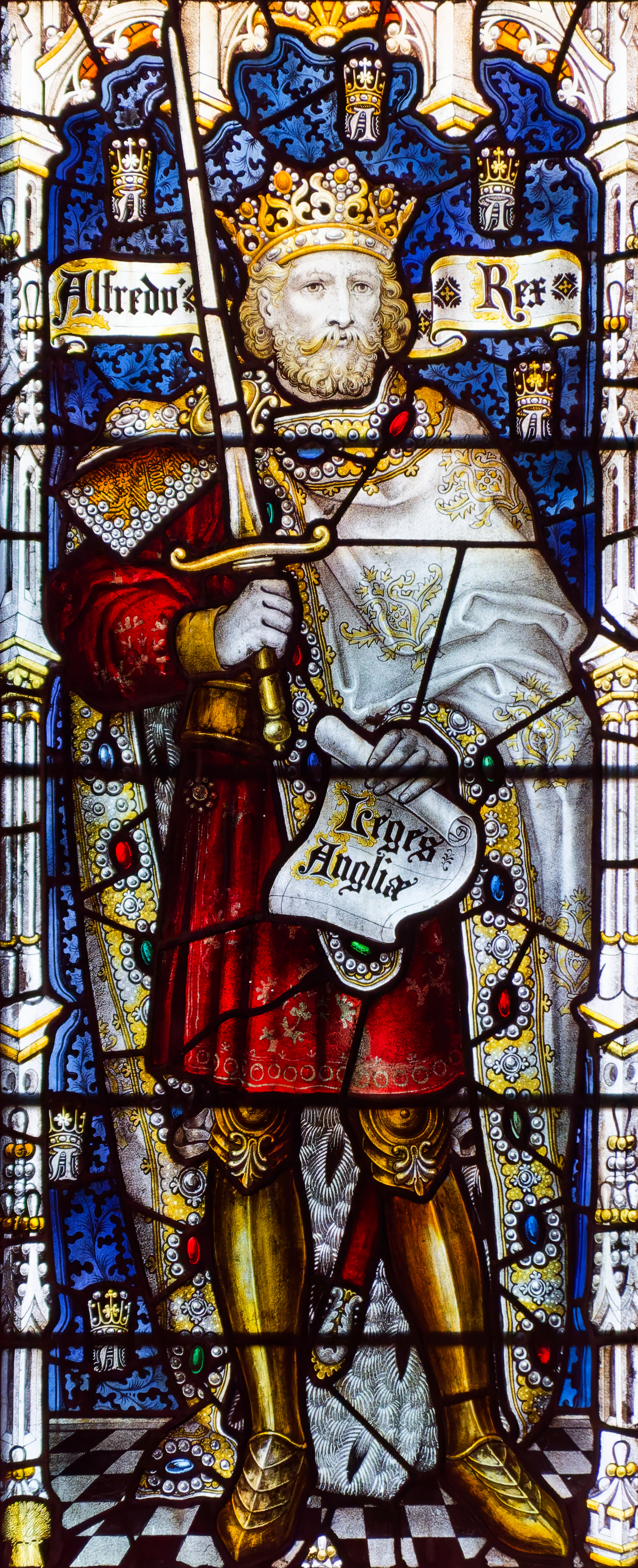
Alfred depicted in a stained-glass window of c. 1905 in Bristol Cathedral

In the 880s, at the same time that he was "cajoling and threatening" his nobles to build and man the burhs, Alfred, perhaps inspired by the example of Charlemagne almost a century before, undertook an equally ambitious effort to revive learning. During this period, the Viking raids were often seen as a divine punishment, and Alfred may have wished to revive religious awe in order to appease God's wrath.

This revival entailed the recruitment of clerical scholars from Mercia, Wales and abroad to enhance the tenor of the court and of the episcopacy; an attempt to require literacy in those who held offices of authority; a series of translations into the vernacular of Latin works the king deemed "most necessary for all men to know"; the compilation of a chronicle detailing the rise of Alfred's kingdom and house, with a genealogy that stretched back to Adam, thus giving the West Saxon kings a biblical ancestry.

Very little is known of the church under Alfred. The Danish attacks had been particularly damaging to the monasteries. Although Alfred founded monasteries at Athelney and Shaftesbury, these were the first new monastic houses in Wessex since the beginning of the eighth century. According to Asser, Alfred enticed foreign monks to England for his monastery at Athelney because there was little interest for the locals to take up the monastic life. Whereas Athelney was for monks, Alfred founded Shaftesbury Abbey in the words of Asser as "residence suitable for nuns". Alfred's daughter, Æthelgifu, became the first Abbess and Shaftesbury Abbey prospered as a royal nunnery.

Alfred undertook no systematic reform of ecclesiastical institutions or religious practices in Wessex. For him, the key to the kingdom's spiritual revival was to appoint pious, learned, and trustworthy bishops and abbots. As king, he saw himself as responsible for both the temporal and spiritual welfare of his subjects. Secular and spiritual authority were not distinct categories for Alfred.

He was equally comfortable distributing his translation of Gregory the Great's Pastoral Care to his bishops so that they might better train and supervise priests and using those same bishops as royal officials and judges. Nor did his piety prevent him from expropriating strategically sited church lands, especially estates along the border with the Danelaw, and transferring them to royal thegns and officials who could better defend them against Viking attacks.

=== Effect of Danish raids on education ===
The Danish raids had a devastating effect on learning in England. Alfred lamented in the preface to his translation of Gregory's Pastoral Care that "learning had declined so thoroughly in England that there were very few men on this side of the Humber who could understand their divine services in English or even translate a single letter from Latin into English: and I suppose that there were not many beyond the Humber either". Alfred undoubtedly exaggerated, for dramatic effect, the abysmal state of learning in England during his youth. That Latin learning had not been obliterated is evidenced by the presence in his court of learned Mercian and West Saxon clerics such as Plegmund, Wæferth, and Wulfsige.

Manuscript production in England dropped off precipitously around the 860s when the Viking invasions began in earnest, not to be revived until the end of the century. Numerous Anglo-Saxon manuscripts burnt along with the churches that housed them. A solemn diploma from Christ Church, Canterbury, dated 873, is so poorly constructed and written that the historian Nicholas Brooks posited a scribe who was either so blind he could not read what he wrote or who knew little or no Latin. "It is clear", Brooks concludes, "that the metropolitan church [of Canterbury] must have been quite unable to provide any effective training in the scriptures or in Christian worship".

=== Establishment of a court school ===
Alfred established a court school for the education of his own children, those of the nobility, and "a good many of lesser birth". There they studied books in both English and Latin and "devoted themselves to writing, to such an extent… they were seen to be devoted and intelligent students of the liberal arts". He recruited scholars from the Continent and from Britain to aid in the revival of Christian learning in Wessex and to provide the king personal instruction. Grimbald of Saint-Bertin and John the Saxon came from Francia; Plegmund (whom Alfred appointed archbishop of Canterbury in 890), Bishop Wærferth of Worcester, Æthelstan, and the royal chaplains Werwulf, from Mercia; and Asser, from the Monastery of Saint David in southwestern Wales.

=== Advocacy of education in English ===
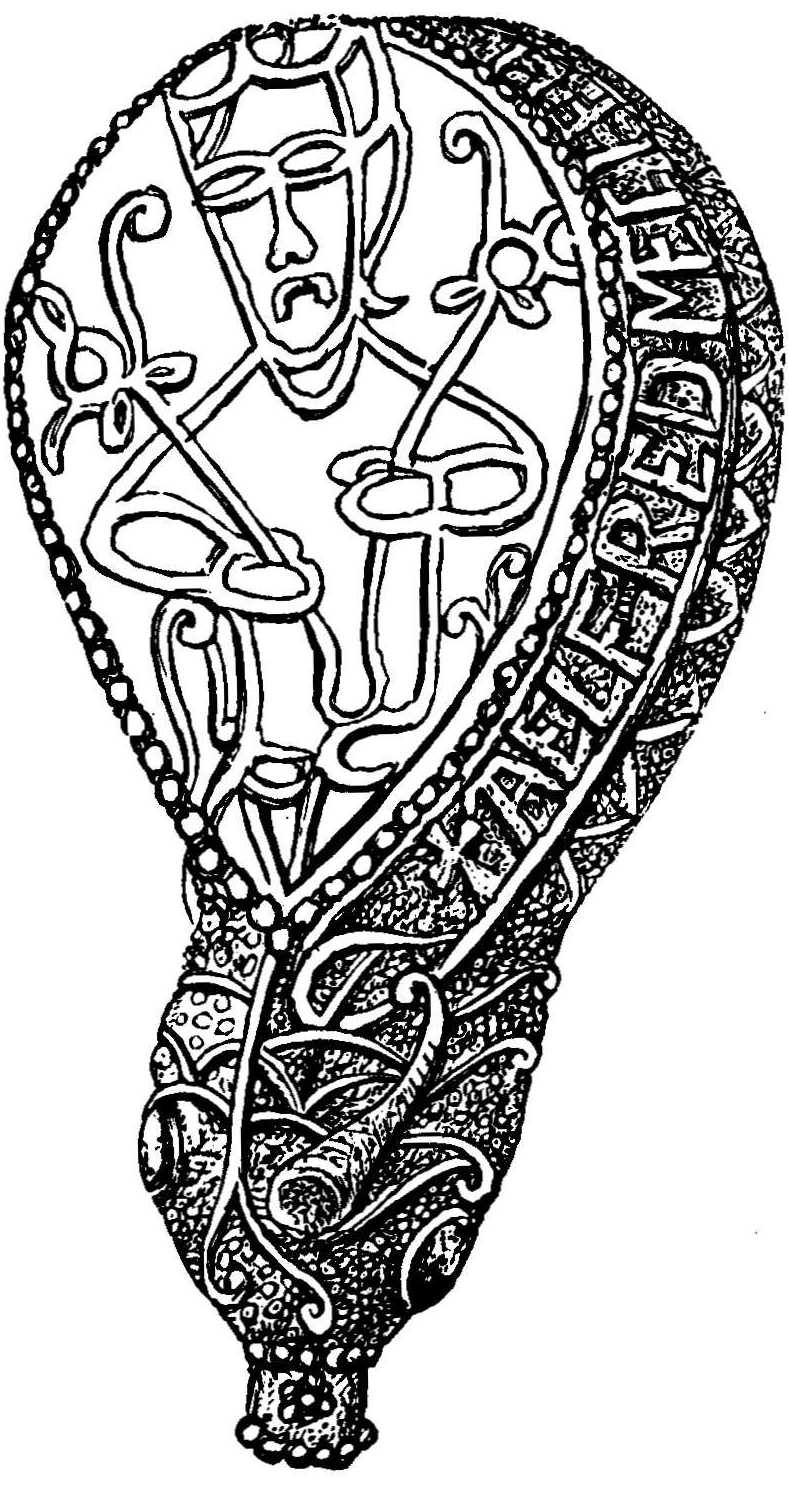
Line drawing of the Alfred Jewel, showing the socket at its base

Alfred's educational ambitions seem to have extended beyond the establishment of a court school. Believing that without Christian wisdom there can be neither prosperity nor success in war, Alfred aimed "to set to learning (as long as they are not useful for some other employment) all the free-born young men now in England who have the means to apply themselves to it". Conscious of the decay of Latin literacy in his realm, Alfred proposed that primary education be taught in English, with those wishing to advance to holy orders to continue their studies in Latin.

There were few "books of wisdom" written in English. Alfred sought to remedy this through an ambitious court-centred programme of translating into English the books he deemed "most necessary for all men to know". It is unknown when Alfred launched this programme, but it may have been during the 880s when Wessex was enjoying a respite from Viking attacks. Alfred was, until recently, often considered to have been the author of many of the translations, but this is now considered doubtful in almost all cases. Scholars more often refer to translations as "Alfredian", indicating that they probably had something to do with his patronage, but are unlikely to be his own work.

Apart from the lost Handboc or Encheiridio, which seems to have been a commonplace book kept by the king, the earliest work to be translated was the Dialogues of Gregory the Great, a book greatly popular in the Middle Ages. The translation was undertaken at Alfred's command by Wærferth, Bishop of Worcester, with the king merely furnishing a preface. Remarkably, Alfred – undoubtedly with the advice and aid of his court scholars – translated four works himself: Gregory the Great's Pastoral Care, Boethius's Consolation of Philosophy, Saint Augustine's Soliloquies and the first fifty psalms of the Psalter. Alfred's psalms have credibly been attested as surviving in the Paris Psalter.

One might add to this list the translation, in Alfred's law code, of excerpts from the Vulgate Book of Exodus. The Old English versions of Orosius's Histories against the Pagans and Bede's Ecclesiastical History of the English People are no longer accepted by scholars as Alfred's own translations because of lexical and stylistic differences. Nonetheless, the consensus remains that they were part of the Alfredian programme of translation. Simon Keynes and Michael Lapidge suggest this also for Bald's Leechbook and the anonymous Old English Martyrology.

The preface of Alfred's translation of Pope Gregory the Great's Pastoral Care explained why he thought it necessary to translate works such as this from Latin into English. Although he described his method as translating "sometimes word for word, sometimes sense for sense", the translation keeps very close to the original although, through his choice of language, he blurred throughout the distinction between spiritual and secular authority. Alfred meant the translation to be used, and circulated it to all his bishops. Interest in Alfred's translation of Pastoral Care was so enduring that copies were still being made in the 11th century.

Boethius's Consolation of Philosophy was the most popular philosophical handbook of the Middle Ages. Unlike the translation of the Pastoral Care, the Alfredian text deals very freely with the original and, though the late Dr. G. Schepss showed that many of the additions to the text are to be traced not to the translator himself but to the glosses and commentaries which he used, still there is much in the work which is distinctive to the translation and has been taken to reflect philosophies of kingship in Alfred's milieu. It is in the Boethius that the oft-quoted sentence occurs: "To speak briefly: I desired to live worthily as long as I lived, and after my life to leave to them that should come after, my memory in good works." The book has come down to us in two manuscripts only. In one of these the writing is prose, in the other a combination of prose and alliterating verse. The latter manuscript was severely damaged in the 18th and 19th centuries.

The last of the Alfredian works is one which bears the name Blostman ("Blooms") or Anthology. The first half is based mainly on the Soliloquies of Saint Augustine, and the remainder is drawn from various sources. The material has traditionally been thought to contain much that is Alfred's own and highly characteristic of him. The last words of it may be quoted; they form a fitting epitaph for the noblest of English kings. "Therefore, he seems to me a very foolish man, and truly wretched, who will not increase his understanding while he is in the world, and ever wish and long to reach that endless life where all shall be made clear." Alfred appears as a character in the twelfth- or 13th-century poem The Owl and the Nightingale where his wisdom and skill with proverbs is praised. The Proverbs of Alfred, a 13th-century work, contains sayings that are not likely to have originated with Alfred but attest to his posthumous medieval reputation for wisdom.

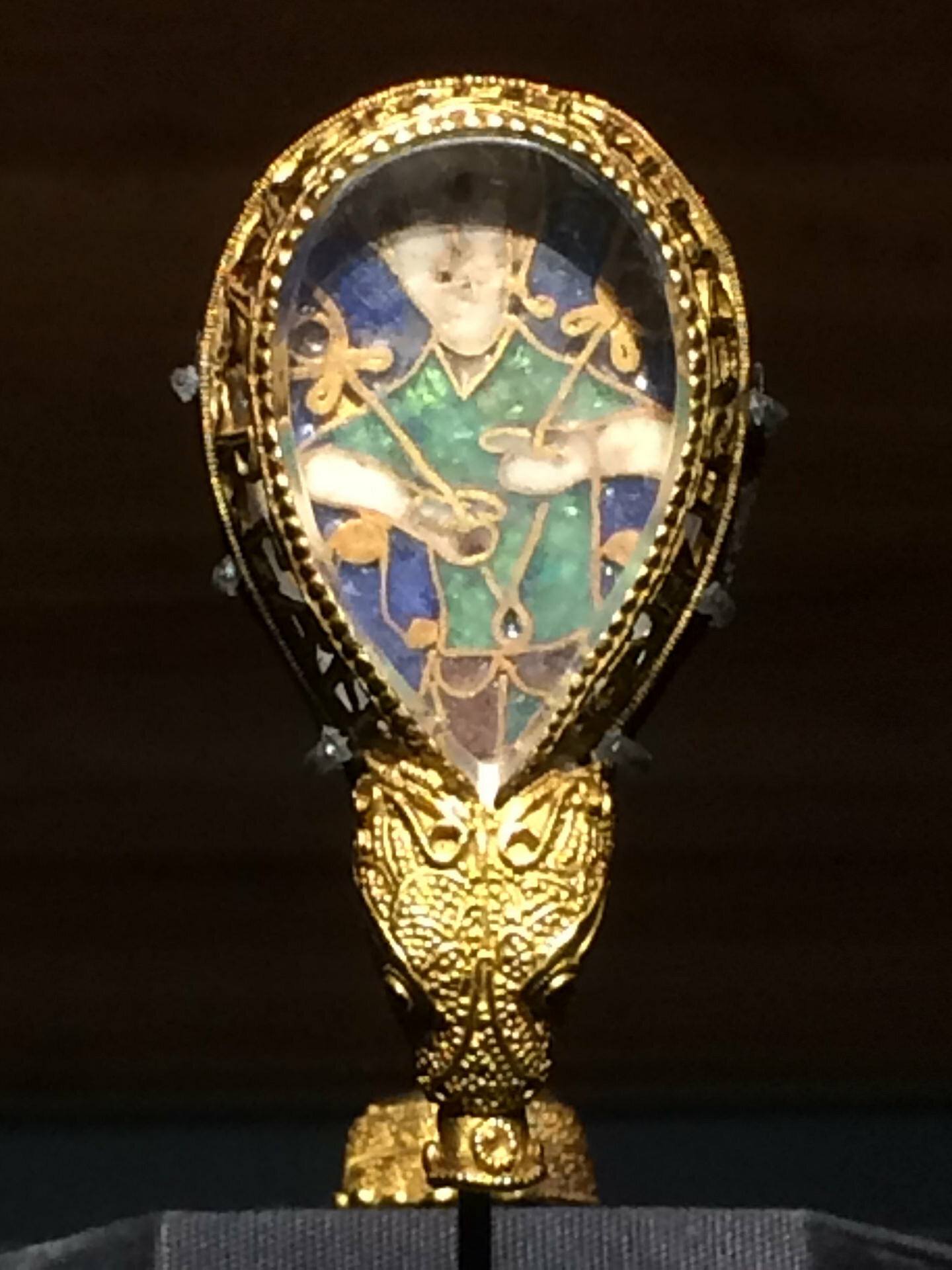
The Alfred Jewel, in the Ashmolean Museum, Oxford, commissioned by Alfred; probably a pointer to aid reading

The Alfred Jewel, discovered in Somerset in 1693, has long been associated with King Alfred because of its Old English inscription AELFRED MEC HEHT GEWYRCAN ("Alfred ordered me to be made"). The jewel is about 2.5 inches (6.4 centimetres) long, made of filigreed gold, enclosing a highly polished piece of quartz crystal beneath which is set in a cloisonné enamel plaque with an enamelled image of a man holding floriate sceptres, perhaps personifying Sight or the Wisdom of God.

It was at one time attached to a thin rod or stick based on the hollow socket at its base. The jewel certainly dates from Alfred's reign. Although its function is unknown, it has been often suggested that the jewel was one of the æstels – pointers for reading – that Alfred ordered sent to every bishopric accompanying a copy of his translation of the Pastoral Care. Each æstel was worth the princely sum of 50 mancuses which fits in well with the exceptional workmanship and expensive materials of the Alfred jewel.

Historian Richard Abels sees Alfred's educational and military reforms as complementary. Restoring religion and learning in Wessex, Abels contends, was to Alfred's mind as essential to the defence of his realm as the building of the burhs. As Alfred observed in the preface to his English translation of Gregory the Great's Pastoral Care, kings who fail to obey their divine duty to promote learning can expect earthly punishments to befall their people. The pursuit of wisdom, he assured his readers of the Boethius, was the surest path to power: "Study wisdom, then, and, when you have learned it, condemn it not, for I tell you that by its means you may without fail attain to power, yea, even though not desiring it".

The portrayal of the West-Saxon resistance to the Vikings by Asser and the chronicler as a Christian holy war was more than mere rhetoric or propaganda. It reflected Alfred's own belief in a doctrine of divine rewards and punishments rooted in a vision of a hierarchical Christian world order in which God is the Lord to whom kings owe obedience and through whom they derive their authority over their followers. The need to persuade his nobles to undertake work for the 'common good' led Alfred and his court scholars to strengthen and deepen the conception of Christian kingship that he had inherited by building upon the legacy of earlier kings including Offa, clerical writers including Bede, and Alcuin and various participants in the Carolingian Renaissance. This was not a cynical use of religion to manipulate his subjects into obedience but an intrinsic element in Alfred's worldview. He believed, as did other kings in ninth-century England and Francia, that God had entrusted him with the spiritual as well as physical welfare of his people. If the Christian faith fell into ruin in his kingdom, if the clergy were too ignorant to understand the Latin words they butchered in their offices and liturgies, if the ancient monasteries and collegiate churches lay deserted out of indifference, he was answerable before God, as Josiah had been. Alfred's ultimate responsibility was the pastoral care of his people.

== Appearance and character ==
Asser wrote of Alfred in his Life of King Alfred:

Now, he was greatly loved, more than all his brothers, by his father and mother—indeed, by everybody—with a universal and profound love, and he was always brought up in the royal court and nowhere else...[He] was seen to be more comely in appearance than his other brothers, and more pleasing in manner, speech and behaviour...[and] in spite of all the demands of the present life, it has been the desire for wisdom, more than anything else, together with the nobility of his birth, which have characterized the nature of his noble mind.

— Keynes & Lapidge 1983, pp. 74–75

It is also written by Asser that Alfred did not learn to read until he was 12 years old or later, which is described as "shameful negligence" on the part of his parents and tutors. Alfred was an excellent listener and had an incredible memory and he retained poetry and psalms very well. A story is told by Asser about how his mother held up a book of Saxon poetry to him and his brothers, and said; "I shall give this book to whichever one of you can learn it the fastest." After excitedly asking, "Will you really give this book to the one of us who can understand it the soonest and recite it to you?" Alfred then took it to his teacher, learned it, and recited it back to his mother.

Alfred is noted as carrying around a small book, probably a medieval version of a small pocket notebook, that contained psalms and many prayers that he often collected. Asser writes: these "he collected in a single book, as I have seen for myself; amid all the affairs of the present life he took it around with him everywhere for the sake of prayer, and was inseparable from it." An excellent hunter in every branch of the sport, Alfred is remembered as an enthusiastic huntsman against whom nobody's skills could compare.

He was the youngest of his brothers, and he was probably the most open-minded. He was an early advocate for education. His desire for learning could have come from his early love of English poetry and inability to read or physically record it until later in life. Asser writes that Alfred "could not satisfy his craving for what he desired the most, namely the liberal arts; for, as he used to say, there were no good scholars in the entire kingdom of the West Saxons at that time".

== Family ==
In 868 Alfred married Ealhswith, daughter of a Mercian nobleman, Æthelred Mucel, Ealdorman of the Gaini. The Gaini were probably one of the tribal groups of the Mercians. Ealhswith's mother, Eadburh, was a member of the Mercian royal family.

They had five or six children together, including Edward the Elder who succeeded his father as king; Æthelflæd who became lady of the Mercians; and Ælfthryth who married Baldwin II, Count of Flanders. Alfred's mother was Osburga, daughter of Oslac of the Isle of Wight, Chief Butler of England. Asser, in his Vita Ælfredi asserts that this shows his lineage from the Jutes of the Isle of Wight.

Osferth was described as a relative in King Alfred's will and he attested charters in a high position until 934. A charter of King Edward's reign described him as the king's brother – mistakenly according to Keynes and Lapidge, but in the view of Janet Nelson, he probably was an illegitimate son of King Alfred.

Name	Birth	Death	Notes
Æthelflæd	c. 870	12 June 918	Married c. 886, Æthelred, Lord of the Mercians d. 911; had issue
Edward	c. 874	17 July 924	Married (1) Ecgwynn, (2) Ælfflæd, (3) 919 Eadgifu
Æthelgifu			Abbess of Shaftesbury
Æthelweard	c. 880	16 October 922(?)	Married and had issue
Ælfthryth		929	Married Baldwin II d. 918; had issue

== Death and burial ==
Alfred died on 26 October 899 at the age of 50 or 51. How he died is unknown, but he suffered throughout his life with a painful and unpleasant illness. His biographer Asser gave a detailed description of Alfred's symptoms, and this has allowed modern doctors to provide a possible diagnosis. It is thought that he had either Crohn's disease or haemorrhoids. His grandson King Eadred seems to have had a similar illness. (Note: According to St Dunstan's apprentice, "poor King Eadred would suck the juice out of the food, chew what remained for a little while and spit it out: a nasty practice that often turned the stomachs of the thegns who dined with him.")

Alfred was temporarily buried at the Old Minster in Winchester with his wife Ealhswith and, later, his son Edward the Elder. Before his death he had ordered the construction of the New Minster hoping that it would become a mausoleum for him and his family. Four years after his death, the bodies of Alfred and his family were exhumed and moved to their new resting place in the New Minster and remained there for 211 years. When William the Conqueror rose to the English throne after the Norman conquest in 1066, many Anglo-Saxon abbeys were demolished and replaced with Norman cathedrals. One of those unfortunate abbeys was the very New Minster abbey where Alfred was laid to rest. Before demolition, the monks at the New Minster exhumed the bodies of Alfred and his family to safely transfer them to a new location. In 1110, the New Minster monks moved to Hyde Abbey, a little north of the city, taking with them Alfred's body and those of his wife and children, which were interred before the high altar.

Locations
1 Where Alfred is suspected to be buried since 1788

Many churches were vandalised during the English Reformation, including Hyde. The Abbey was dissolved in 1538, the church and cloister were demolished and treated like a quarry, and the stones that made up the abbey were then re-used in local architecture. The stone graves housing Alfred and his family stayed underground, and the land returned to farming. These graves remained intact until 1788 when the site was acquired by the county for the construction of a town jail.

=== Modern era ===
Before construction began, convicts who would later be imprisoned at the site were sent in to prepare the ground, ready for building. While digging the foundation trenches, the convicts discovered the coffins of Alfred and his family. A local Roman Catholic priest, John Milner, recounted this event:

Thus miscreants couch amidst the ashes of our Alfreds and Edwards; and where once religious silence and contemplation were only interrupted by the bell of regular observance, the chanting of devotion, now alone resound the clank of the captives chains and the oaths of the profligate! In digging for the foundation of that mournful edifice, at almost every stroke of the mattock or spade some ancient sepulchre was violated, the venerable contents of which were treated with marked indignity. On this occasion a great number of stone coffins were dug up, with a variety of other curious articles, such as chalices, patens, rings, buckles, the leather of shoes and boots, velvet and gold lace belonging to chasubles and other vestments; as also the crook, rims, and joints of a beautiful crosier double gilt.

The convicts broke the stone coffins into pieces. The lead, which lined the coffins, was sold for two guineas, and the bones within scattered around the area.

The prison was demolished between 1846 and 1850. Further excavations, in 1866 and 1897, were inconclusive. In 1866, amateur antiquarian John Mellor claimed to have recovered a number of bones from the site which he said were those of Alfred. These came into the possession of the vicar of nearby St Bartholomew's Church who reburied them in an unmarked grave in the church graveyard.

Excavations conducted by the Winchester Museums Service of the Hyde Abbey site in 1999 located a second pit dug in front of where the high altar would have been located, which was identified as probably dating to Mellor's 1866 excavation. The 1999 archaeological excavation uncovered the foundations of the abbey buildings and some bones, suggested at the time to be those of Alfred. They proved instead to belong to an elderly woman.

In March 2013 the Diocese of Winchester exhumed the bones from the unmarked grave at St Bartholomew's and placed them in secure storage. The diocese made no claim that they were the bones of Alfred, but intended to secure them for later analysis, and from the attentions of people whose interest may have been sparked by the recent identification of the remains of Richard III. The bones were radiocarbon-dated but the results showed that they were from the 1300s and therefore not of Alfred.

In January 2014 a fragment of pelvis that had been unearthed in the 1999 excavation of the Hyde site, and had subsequently lain in a Winchester museum store room, was radiocarbon-dated to the correct period. It has been suggested that this bone may belong to either Alfred or his son Edward, but this remains unproven.

== Will and testament ==
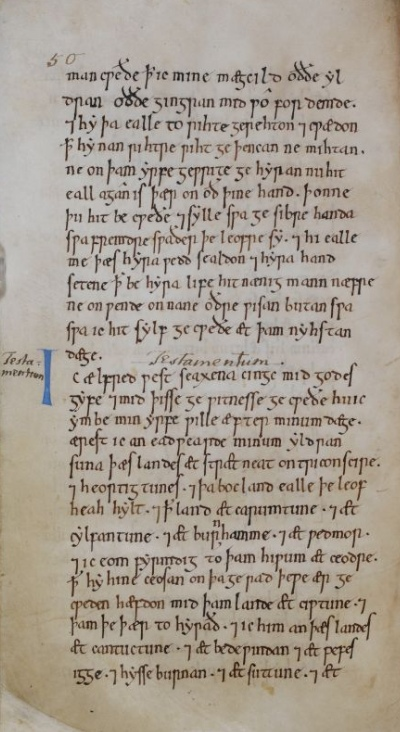
Will of Alfred the Great, AD 873–88 (11th-century copy, British Library Stowe MS 944, ff. 29v–33r)

Alfred's will is the oldest to survive of any English king and only one of two surviving from the Anglo-Saxon period (the other being Eadred's). Aethelwulf also made a will but this has not survived besides a short description by Asser. The terminus post quem is given by the fact that it mentions Alfred's 5 children (he married in 868); the terminus ante quem is 30 June 888, when Archbishop Ethelred, the author, died.

The will is written in Old English and survives in one early 11th-century copy (British Library Stowe MS 944, ff. 29v–33r). The Old English text was first published by Manning in 1788, with a modern English translation by Dorothy Whitelock (1955):

I, Alfred, king of the West Saxons, by the grace of God and with this witness, declare how I wish to dispose of my inheritance after my death. First, I grant to Edward my elder son the land at Stratton in Trigg and Hartland and all the booklands which Leofheah holds, and the land at Carhampton and at Kilton and at Burnham and at Wedmore—and I beseech the community at Cheddar to choose him on the terms which we have already agreed on—along with the land at Chewton and what belongs to it. And I grant him the land at Cannington and at Bedwyn and at Pewsey and at Hurstbourne and at Sutton and at Leatherhead and at Carshalton, and all the booklands which I have in Kent.

And [the lands] at the lower Hurstbourne and at Chiseldon are to be given to Winchester on the terms on which my father bequeathed it, and my private property which I entrusted to Ecgwulf at the lower Hurstbourne.

And to my younger son the land at Arreton and that at Dean and that at Meon and at Amesbury and at Dean and at Sturminster and at Yeovil and at Crewkerne and at Whitchurch and at Axmouth and at Branscombe and at Cullompton and at Tiverton and at Milborne and at Exminster and at Suðeswyrðe and at Lifton, and the lands which belong to it, namely all that I have in Cornwall except Trigg.

And to my eldest daughter the residence at Wellow; and to my middle daughter that at Kingsclere and at Candover, and to the youngest the estate at Wellow and at Ashton and at Chippanham. And to my brother’s son Æthelhelm the estate at Aldingbourne and at Compton and at Crondall and at Deeding and at Beddingham and at Burnham and at Thunderfield and at Eashing. And to my brother’s son Æthelwold the residence at Godalming and at Guildford and at Steyning. And to my kinsman Osferth the residence at Beckley and at Rotherfield and at Ditchling and at Sutton and at Lyminster and at Angmering and at Felpham, and the lands which belong thereto. And to Ealhswith the estate at Lambourn and at Wantage and at Edington.

And to my two sons 1,000 pounds, 500 pounds to each; and to my eldest daughter and my middle daughter and the youngest and to Ealhswith, 400 pounds to the four of them, 100 pounds to each. And to each of my ealdormen 100 mancuses, and likewise to Æthelhelm and Æthelwold and Osferth; and to Ealdorman Ethelred a sword worth 100 mancuses. And the men who serve me, to whom I have now given money at Eastertide, are to be given 200 pounds, and it is to be divided among them, to each as much as will fall to him according to the manner in which I have just now made my distribution. And to the archbishop 100 mancuses and to Bishop Esne and to Bishop Wærferth and to the bishop of Sherborne. And there is to be distributed for me and for my father and for the friends for whom he used to intercede and I intercede, 200 pounds, 50 to mass-priests throughout my kingdom, 50 to poor servants of God, 50 to poor men in need, 50 to the church in which I shall be buried. I know not for certain whether there is so much money, nor do I know if there is more, but I think so. If there is more, it is to be shared among all to whom I have bequeathed money; and it is my will that my ealdormen and my officials shall all be included and shall distribute it thus.

== Legacy ==
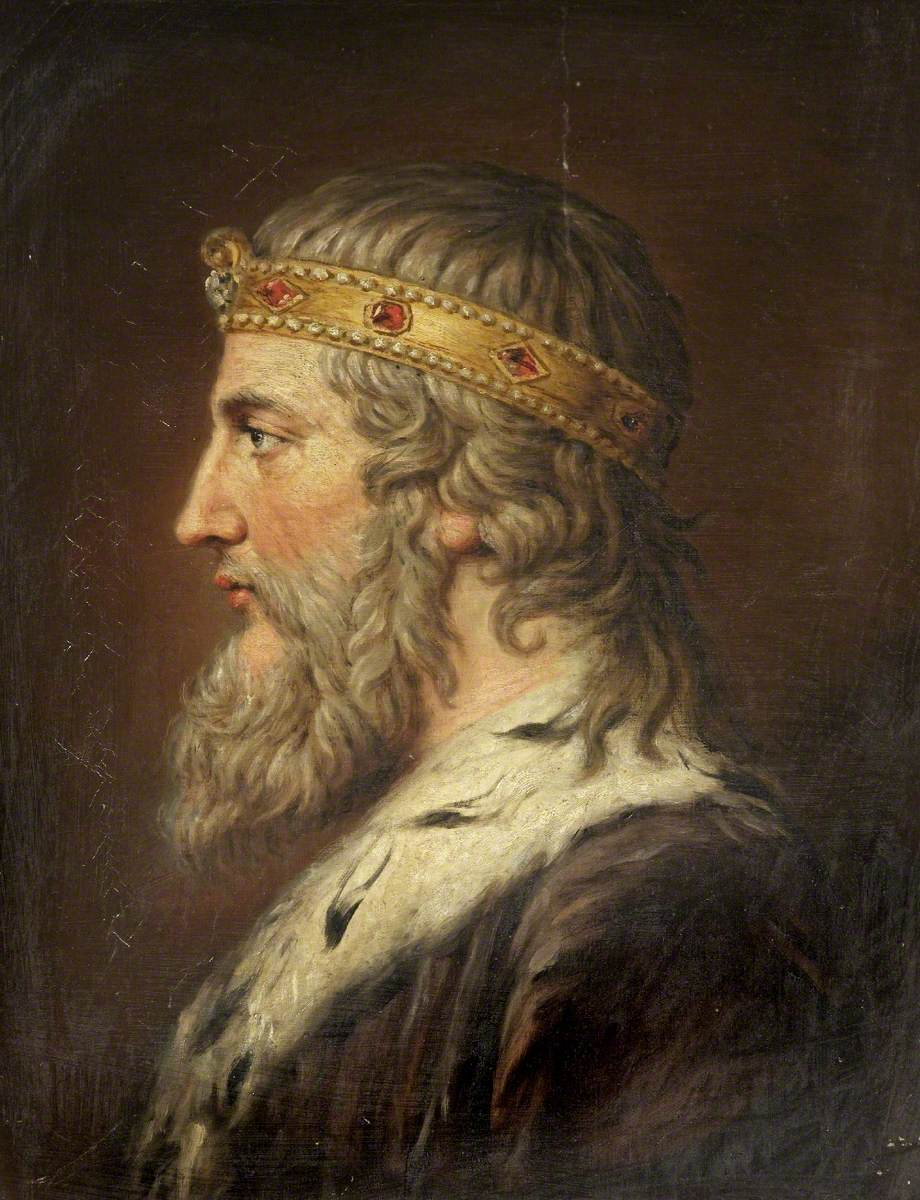
Nineteenth-century imaginary depiction of Alfred attributed to Samuel Woodforde

Henry VI of England attempted unsuccessfully to have Alfred canonised by Pope Eugene IV in 1441. The current "Roman Martyrology" does not mention Alfred. The Anglican Communion venerates him as a Christian hero, with a Lesser Festival on 26 October, and he may often be found depicted in stained glass in Church of England parish churches.

In 2007 the Holy Synod of the Russian Orthodox Church canonised "All Saints of the British Isles" including King Alfred. He is honoured during the Feast of all Saints of the British Isles on the third Sunday after Pentecost and on his feast day of 26 October.

Alfred commissioned Bishop Asser to write his biography, which inevitably emphasised Alfred's positive aspects. Later medieval historians such as Geoffrey of Monmouth also reinforced Alfred's favourable image. By the time of the Reformation, Alfred was seen as a pious Christian ruler who promoted the use of English rather than Latin, and so the translations that he commissioned were viewed as untainted by the later Roman Catholic influences of the Normans. Consequently, while Alfred's epithet, "the Great", was in regular use from the 13th century, it was writers of the 16th century who popularised it. There is no evidence of Alfred's contemporaries using the sobriquet. The epithet was retained by succeeding generations who admired Alfred's patriotism, success against barbarism, promotion of education, and establishment of the rule of law.

The Royal Navy named one ship and two shore establishments HMS King Alfred, and in 1774 one of the early ships of the United States Navy was named USS Alfred in his honour. In 2002 Alfred was ranked number 14 in the BBC's list of the 100 Greatest Britons following a UK-wide vote.

== Statues ==
=== Pewsey ===
A prominent statue of Alfred stands in the middle of Pewsey, Wiltshire, where he was a landowner. It was unveiled in June 1913 to commemorate the coronation of King George V.

=== Southwark ===
A statue of Alfred located in Trinity Church Square, Southwark, considered to be the oldest outdoor statue in London, and part of it has been found to date to Roman times. The sculpture was thought to be medieval until 2021 conservation work. The lower half was then discovered to be Bath Stone and part of a colossal ancient sculpture dedicated to the goddess Minerva. It is typical of the 2nd century, dating to around the reign of Hadrian. The lower older half is likely to have been carved by a continental craftsman used to working with British stone. The upper half dates to the late 18th or early 19th century, cast from artificial Coade stone to fit the lower portion.

=== Wantage ===
A statue of Alfred, situated in the Wantage market place, was sculpted by Count Gleichen, a relative of Queen Victoria, and unveiled on 14 July 1877 by the Prince and the Princess of Wales. The statue was vandalised on New Year's Eve 2007, losing part of its right arm and axe. After the arm and axe were replaced, the statue was again vandalised on Christmas Eve 2008, losing its axe.

=== Winchester ===
A bronze statue of Alfred stands at the eastern end of The Broadway, close to the site of Winchester's medieval East Gate. The statue was designed by Hamo Thornycroft, cast in bronze by Singer & Sons of Frome and erected in 1899 to mark one thousand years since Alfred's death. It is placed on a pedestal consisting of two immense blocks of grey Cornish granite.

=== Alfred University ===
The centrepiece of the quad of Alfred University in Alfred, New York, United States, is a bronze statue of the King, created in 1990 by William Underhill, who was then a professor at the university. It depicts Alfred as a young man, holding a shield in his left hand and an open book in his right.

=== Cleveland ===
A marble statue of Alfred stands on the North side of the Cuyahoga County Courthouse in Cleveland, Ohio, United States. It was sculpted by Isidore Konti in 1910.

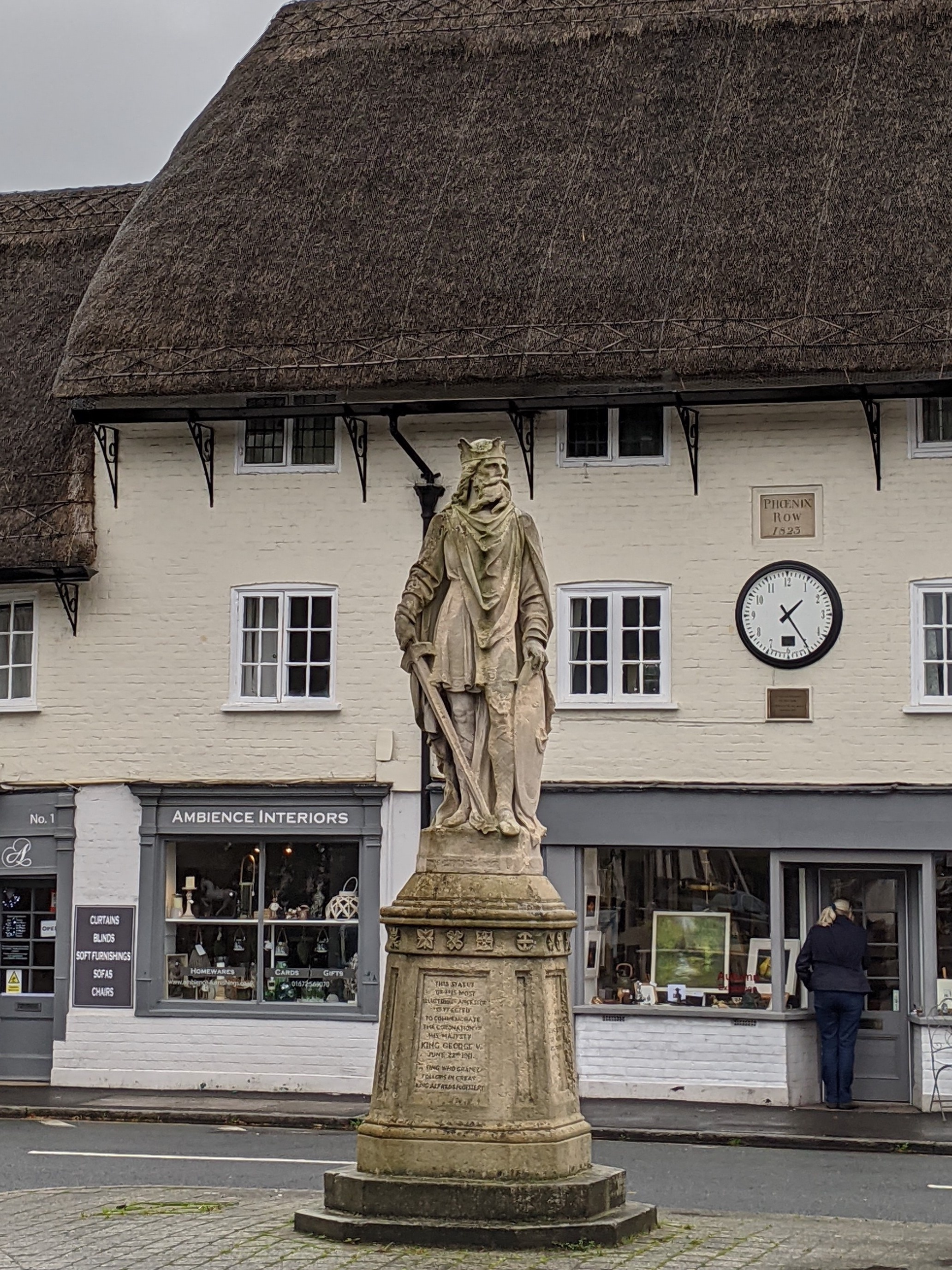
1913 statue of Alfred in Pewsey, Wiltshire

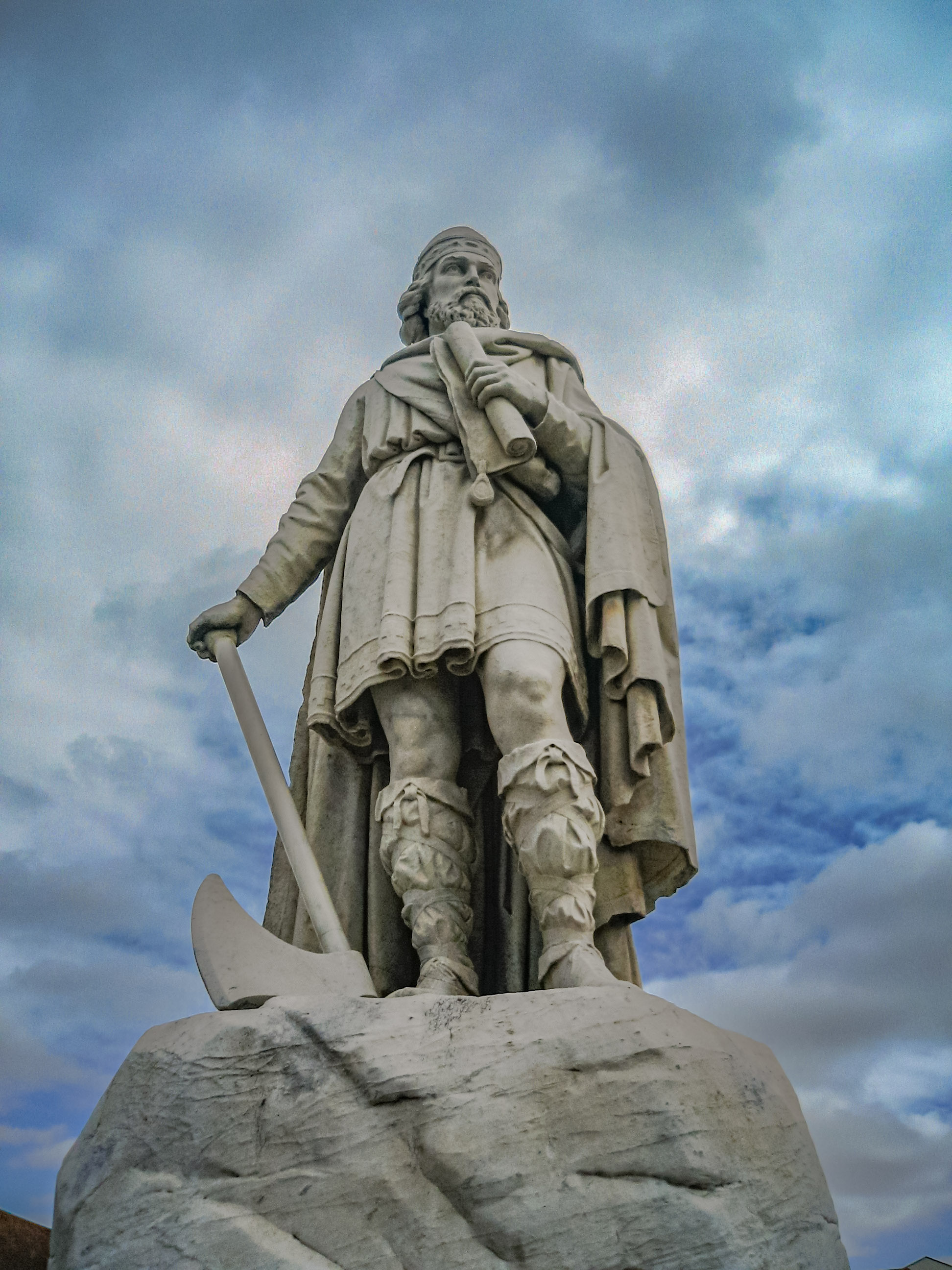
Statue of Alfred the Great in Wantage, Oxfordshire

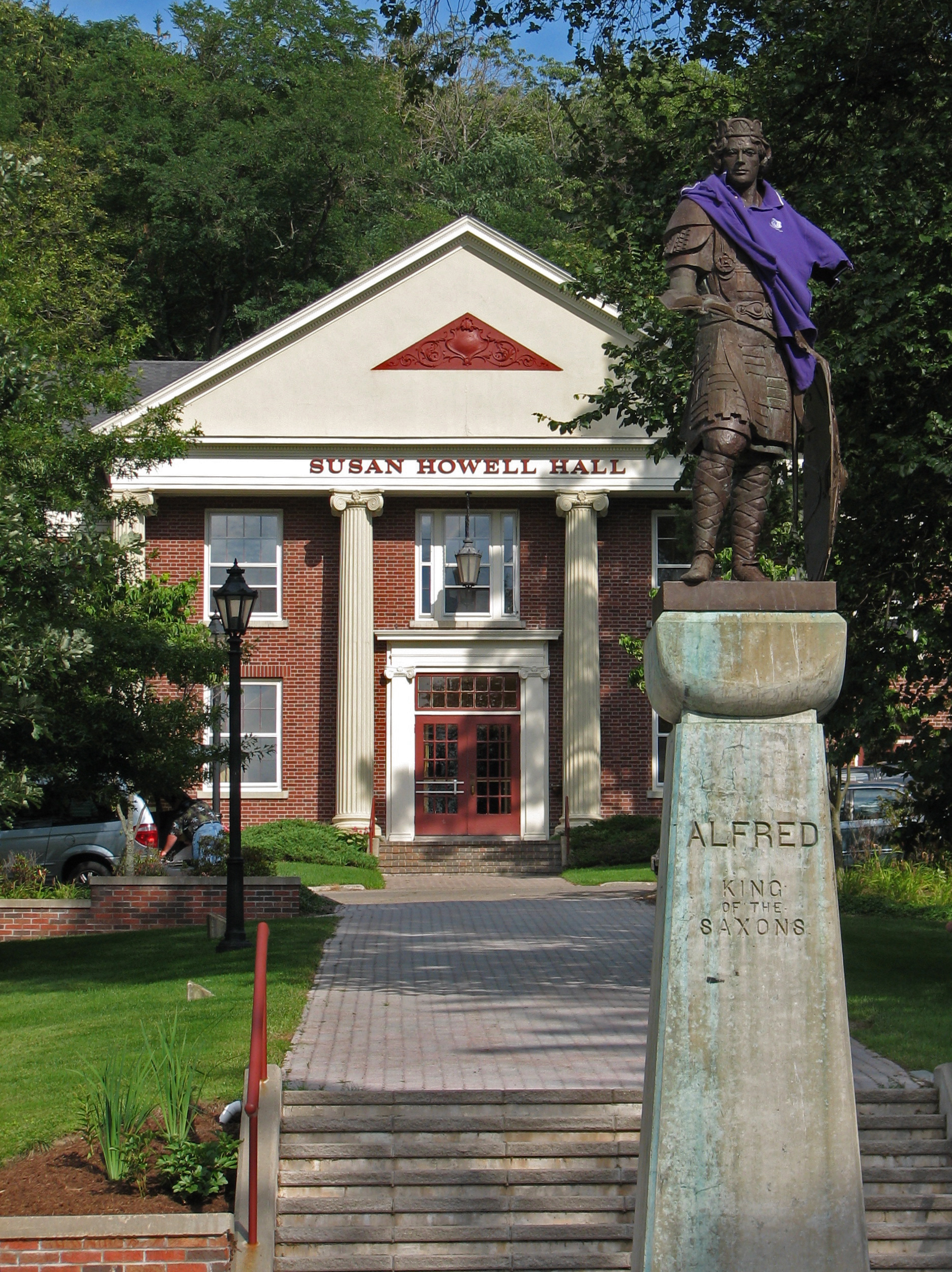
Statue of Alfred at the centre of Alfred University's quad in Alfred, New York, US. It is often decorated by students; in this instance, it was dressed in a purple Orientation Guide shirt for freshman orientation.

== Chronology ==
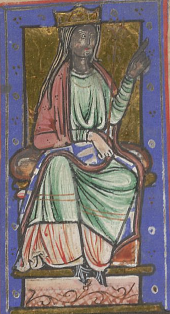
Alfred's sister, Queen Æthelswith of Mercia, in a manuscript of 1220

Date	Event
c. 848	Alfred is born in Wantage, Berkshire.
c. 852	Alfred's oldest brother Æthelstan of Kent dies.
c. 853	Alfred's sister, Æthelswith marries Burgred, the king of Mercians.
c. 854	Alfred's father Æthelwulf sends Alfred and his youngest older brother Æthelred on a pilgrimage to Rome.
c. 854	Alfred's mother Osburh dies.
c. 855	Æthelwulf goes on a pilgrimage with Alfred, after dividing his realm between his sons, Æthelbald and Æthelberht.
c. 856	Preteen Judith of Flanders becomes the stepmother of Alfred after Æthelwulf marries her.
c. 856	Æthelwulf returns home, but Æthelbald refuses to give up his position, forcing Æthelwulf to retire to Kent with Æthelberht.
c. 858	Æthelwulf dies.
c. 860	Æthelbald dies and is succeeded by his brother Æthelberht.
c. 865	Æthelberht dies and is succeeded by his brother Æthelred.
c. 865	The Great Heathen Army lands in East Anglia.
c. 868	Æthelred aids Burgred against the Danes.
c. 868	Alfred marries Ealhswith in Gainsborough, Lincolnshire.
c. 870	Alfred's first child Æthelflæd is born.
c. 871	Æthelred dies and is succeeded by Alfred.
c. 871	Alfred makes peace with the Danes and takes Winchester as his residence.
c. 872	Burgred pays tribute to the Danes.
c. 873	The Danes invade Mercia and seize Repton.
c. 874	Danes sack Tamworth, exiling Burgred.
c. 874	Alfred's first son Edward is born.
c. 874	The Great Heathen Army splits as Halfdan retires to Northumbria.
c. 875	Guthrum invades Alfred's realm.
c. 876	Guthrum takes Wareham, but is besieged by Alfred. The Danes abandon Wareham, only to take Exeter instead.
c. 877	Alfred besieges Exeter and is able to expel the Danes from his realm.
c. 878	Alfred is forced to flee to Somerset Levels and begin guerilla warfare.
c. 878	Alfred defeats Guthrum decisively in the Battle of Edington, causing Guthrum's conversion to Christianity.
c. 878	Alfred's subject defeats another Danish invasion in the Battle of Cynwit.
c. 886	Alfred conquers London and declares himself the king of the Anglo-Saxons.
c. 888	Æthelswith dies in Pavia.
c. 893	Edward marries Ecgwynn.
c. 894	Alfred becomes a grandfather when Ecgwynn gives birth to Æthelstan, the son of Edward.
899	Alfred dies.

== Sources ==
- Abels, Richard P. (1988). Lordship and Military Obligation in Anglo-Saxon England. British Museum Press. pp. 58–78. ISBN 978-0-7141-0552-9.
- Abels, Richard (1998). Alfred the Great: War, Kingship and Culture in Anglo-Saxon England. Longman. ISBN 978-0-5820-4047-2.
- Abels, Richard (2002). "Royal Succession and the Growth of Political Stability in Ninth-Century Wessex". The Haskins Society Journal: Studies in Medieval History. 12: 83–97. ISBN 978-1-8438-3008-5.
- Attenborough, F.L., ed. (1974) [1922]. The laws of the earliest English kings. Cambridge University Press. pp. 52–53, 62–93, 98–101. ISBN 978-0-4045-6545-9. Archived from the original on 10 October 2016.
- Bately, Janet (1970). "King Alfred and the Old English Translation of Orosius". Anglia. 88: 433–460. doi:10.1515/angl.1970.1970.88.433. S2CID 161672815.
- Bately, Janet (1990). ""Those books that are most necessary for all men to know": The Classics and late ninth-century England: a reappraisal". In Bernardo, Aldo S.; Levin, Saul (eds.). The Classics in the Middle Ages. Binghamtion, New York: Binghamton University. pp. 45–78.
- Bately, Janet M. (2014). "Alfred as Author and Translator". In Nicole Guenther Discenza; Paul E. Szarmach (eds.). A Companion to Alfred the Great. Leiden: Brill. pp. 113–142. doi:10.1163/9789004283763_006. ISBN 978-9-0042-8376-3.
- "Bone fragment 'could be King Alfred or son Edward'". BBC News. 17 January 2014.
- Blackburn, M.A.S. (1998). "The London mint in the reign of Alfred". In Blackburn, M.A.S.; Dumville, D.N. (eds.). Kings, Currency and Alliances: History and Coinage of Southern England in the 9th Century. pp. 105–124.
- Bradshaw, Anthony (1999). The Burghal Hidage: Alfred's Towns. Archived from the original on 16 July 2011.
- Brooks, Nicholas (1984). The Early History of the Church of Canterbury: Christ Church from 597 to 1066. pp. 172–173.
- Brooks, N.P.; Graham-Campbell, J.A. (1986). "Reflections on the Viking-age silver hoard from Croydon, Surrey". Anglo-Saxon Monetary History: Essays in Memory of Michael Dolley. pp. 91–110.
- Cannon, John (1997). The Oxford Companion to British History. Oxford: Oxford University Press. ISBN 0-1986-6176-2.
- Charles-Edwards, T. M. (2013). Wales and the Britons 350–1064. Oxford, UK: Oxford University Press. ISBN 978-0-1982-1731-2.
- "The Post-Mortem Adventures of Alfred The Great". The Church Monuments Society. Archived from the original on 4 March 2016.
- Cohen, Tamara (27 March 2013). "Could these be the bones of Alfred the Great?". IOL Scitech.
- Costambeys, Marios (2004). "Ealhswith (d. 902)". Oxford Dictionary of National Biography (online ed.). Oxford University Press. doi:10.1093/ref:odnb/39226. (Subscription, Wikipedia Library access or UK public library membership required.)
- "Alfred 'The Great' (r. 871–899)". The Royal Family. Archived from the original on 1 October 2017.
- Craig, G (May 1991). "Alfred the Great: a diagnosis". Journal of the Royal Society of Medicine. 84 (5): 303–305. doi:10.1177/014107689108400518. PMC 1293232. PMID 1819247.
- Crofton, Ian (2006). The Kings & Queens of England. Quercus Publishing. p. 8. ISBN 978-1-8472-4628-8.
- "The Top 100 Great Britons". BBC. Archived from the original on 4 December 2002.
- Dodson, Aidan (2004). The Royal Tombs of Great Britain. London: Duckworth.
- Doubleday, Arthur; Page, William, eds. (1903). Houses of Benedictine monks: New Minster, or the Abbey of Hyde. London: British History Online. pp. 116–122.
- Dumville, David (1979). "The ætheling: a study in Anglo-Saxon constitutional history". Anglo-Saxon England. 8: 1–33. doi:10.1017/s026367510000301x. S2CID 159954001.
- Dumville, David (1986). "The West Saxon Genealogical List: Manuscripts and Texts". Anglia. 104: 1–32. doi:10.1515/angl.1986.1986.104.1. ISSN 0340-5222. S2CID 162322618.
- Dumville, David (1992). Wessex and England from Alfred to Edgar : six essays on political, cultural, and ecclesiastical revival. Woodbridge, Suffolk: Boydell Press. ISBN 978-0-8511-5308-7.
- Dumville, David (1996). Fryde, E.B.; Greenway, D. E.; Porter, S.; Roy, I (eds.). Handbook of British Chronology (3rd with corrections ed.). Cambridge: Cambridge University Press. ISBN 0-5215-6350-X.
- Dunstan, St (1992). Ramsey, Nigel; Sparks, Margaret; Tatton-Brown, Tim (eds.). St Dunstan:His Life, Times, and Cult. Woodbridge, Suffolk, UK: Boydell Press. ISBN 0-8511-5301-1.
- Edwards, Heather (2004). "Ecgberht [Egbert] (d. 839)". Oxford Dictionary of National Biography (online ed.). Oxford University Press. doi:10.1093/ref:odnb/8581. (Subscription, Wikipedia Library access or UK public library membership required.)
- Firth, Matthew (2024). "What's in a Name? Tracing the Origins of Alfred's 'the Great'". English Historical Review. 139 (596): 1–32. doi:10.1093/ehr/ceae078. ISSN 1477-4534.
- Firth, Matthew; Sebo, Erin (2020). "Kingship and Maritime Power in 10th-Century England". The International Journal of Nautical Archaeology. 49 (2): 329–340. Bibcode:2020IJNAr..49..329F. doi:10.1111/1095-9270.12421. ISSN 1095-9270.
- Fleming, Robin (1985). "Monastic lands and England's defence in the Viking Age". English Historical Review. 100 (395): 247–265. doi:10.1093/ehr/C.CCCXCV.247.
- Foot, Sarah (2011). Æthelstan: The First King of England. New Haven and London: Yale University Press. ISBN 978-0-3001-2535-1.
- Gifford, Edwin; Gifford, Joyce (2003). "Alfred's new longships". In Reuter, Timothy (ed.). Alfred the Great (Studies in early medieval Britain). Ashgate. pp. 281–289. ISBN 978-0-7546-0957-5.
- The Anglo-Saxon Chronicle. Translated by Giles, J. A.; Ingram, J. Project Gutenberg. September 1996. Archived from the original on 29 June 2011. — "Note: This electronic edition [of the Anglo-Saxon Chronicle] is a collation of material from nine diverse extant versions of the Chronicle. It contains primarily the translation of Rev. James Ingram, as published in the [1847] Everyman edition". It was "Originally compiled on the orders of King Alfred the Great, approximately A.D. 890, and subsequently maintained and added to by generations of anonymous scribes until the middle of the 12th Century".
- Godden, M. R. (2007). "Did King Alfred Write Anything?". Medium Ævum. 76 (1): 1–23. doi:10.2307/43632294. ISSN 0025-8385. JSTOR 43632294.
- Gransden, Antonia (1996). Historical Writing in England: c. 500 to c. 1307. London: Routledge. ISBN 0-4151-5124-4.
- Gregory I, Pope; Alfred, King of England (1871). Sweet, Henry (ed.). King Alfred's West-Saxon version of Gregory's Pastoral care. London: N. Trübner & Company for the Early English text society. Archived from the original on 22 March 2016.
- Hill, Paul (2009). The Viking Wars of Alfred the Great. Westholme. p. 17. ISBN 978-1-5941-6087-5.
- Hill, David; Rumble, Alexander R., eds. (1996). The Defence of Wessex: The Burghal Hidage and Anglo-Saxon Fortifications. Manchester: Manchester University Press. ISBN 0-7190-3218-0.
- Hollister, C. Warren (1962). Anglo-Saxon Military Institutions on the Eve of the Norman Conquest. Oxford: Clarendon Press.
- Horspool, David (2006). Why Alfred Burned the Cakes. London: Profile Books. ISBN 1-8619-7786-7.
- Hull, Lise E. (2006). Britain's Medieval Castles. Westport, CT: Praeger. ISBN 978-0-2759-8414-4.
- Hunt, William (1889). "Ethelbald (d.860)" . In Stephen, Leslie (ed.). Dictionary of National Biography. Vol. 18. London: Smith, Elder & Co. p. 16.
- Henry of Huntingdon (1969). "Histories". In Giles, J.A. (ed.). Memorials of King Alfred: being essays on the history and antiquities of England during the ninth century, the age of King Alfred, by various authors. Burt Franklin research & source works series. New York: Burt Franklin.
- Huscroft, Richard (2019). Making England 796–1042. Abingdon, UK: Routledge. ISBN 978-1-1381-8246-2.
- Hutchison-Hall, John (Ellsworth) (2017). Orthodox Saints of the British Isles. Vol. IV - October–December. United States of America: St. Eadfrith Press. ISBN 978-1-5427-1822-6.
- Jackson, F I (January 1992). "Letter to the editor: Alfred the Great: a diagnosis". Journal of the Royal Society of Medicine. 85 (1): 58. PMC 1293470. PMID 1610468.
- Kalmar, Tomas (2016a). "Born in the Margin: The Chronological Scaffolding of Asser's Vita Ælfredi". Peritia. 17: 79–98. doi:10.1484/J.PERIT.5.112197. ISSN 0332-1592.
- Kalmar, Tomas (2016b). "Then Alfred took the Throne and then what? Parker's Error and Plummer's Blind Spot". In Volodarskaya, Emma; Roberts, Jane (eds.). Language, Culture and Society in Russian/English Studies: the Proceedings of the Sixth Conference 27–28 July 2015. London, Senate House: University of London. pp. 37–83. ISBN 978-5-8896-6097-2. Archived from the original on 28 June 2020.
- Kennedy, Maev (27 March 2013). "'Alfred the Great' bones exhumed from unmarked grave". The Guardian.
- Keynes, Simon; Lapidge, Michael (1983). Alfred the Great, Asser's Life of King Alfred and other contemporary sources. Harmondsworth, England: Penguin. ISBN 0-1404-4409-2. OL 2893362M.
- Keynes, Simon (1993). "The Control of Kent in the Ninth Century". Early Medieval Europe. 2 (2): 111–131. doi:10.1111/j.1468-0254.1993.tb00013.x. ISSN 1468-0254.
- Keynes, Simon (1995). "England, 700–900". In McKitterick, Rosamond (ed.). The New Cambridge Medieval History. Vol. II. Cambridge, UK: Cambridge University Press. pp. 18–42. ISBN 978-0-5213-6292-4.
- Keynes, Simon (1998). "Alfred and the Mercians". In Blackburn, Mark A.S.; Dumville, David N. (eds.). Kings, currency, and alliances: history and coinage of southern England in the ninth century. Woodbridge: Boydell & Brewer. pp. 1–46. ISBN 978-0-8511-5598-2.
- Keynes, Simon (1999). "King Alfred the Great and Shaftesbury Abbey". Studies in the Early History of Shaftesbury Abbey. Dorset County Council. ISBN 978-0-8521-6887-5. OCLC 41466697.
- Keynes, Simon (2014). "Asser". In Lapidge, Michael; Blair, John; Keynes, Simon; Scragg, Donald (eds.). The Wiley Blackwell Encyclopedia of Anglo-Saxon England (Second ed.). Chichester, UK: Blackwell Publishing. pp. 51–52. ISBN 978-0-4706-5632-7.
- Keys, David (17 January 2014). "Bones of King Alfred the Great believed to have been found in a box at Winchester City Museum". The Independent. Archived from the original on 17 January 2014.
- Kirby, D. H. (2000). The Earliest English Kings (Revised ed.). London: Routledge. ISBN 978-0-4152-4211-0.
- Kiernan, Kevin S. (1998). "Alfred the Great's Burnt Boethius". In Bornstein, George; Tinkle, Theresa (eds.). The Iconic Page in Manuscript, Print, and Digital Culture. Ann Arbor: University of Michigan Press.
- Lapidge, Michael (2001). Blair, John; Keynes, Simon; Scragg, Donald (eds.). The Blackwell Encyclopaedia of Anglo-Saxon England. London, UK: Blackwell. ISBN 0-6312-2492-0.
- Lavelle, Ryan (2010). Alfred's Wars: Sources and Interpretations of Anglo-Saxon Warfare in the Viking Age. Woodbridge, Suffolk: Boydel Press. ISBN 978-1-8438-3569-1.
- Loyn, H.R (1991). Anglo-Saxon England and the Norman Conquest. Harlow, Essex: Longman Group. ISBN 0-5820-7297-2.
- Lavelle, Ryan (2003). Fortifications in Wessex c. 800-1066. Oxford: Osprey. ISBN 978-1-8417-6639-3.
- Malmesbury, William (1904). Giles, J.A. (ed.). Chronicle of the Kings of England. London: George Bell and Sons. Archived from the original on 25 February 2013.
- Merkle, Benjamin (2009). The White Horse King: The Life of Alfred the Great. New York: Thomas Nelson. p. 220. ISBN 978-1-5955-5252-5.
- Miller, Sean (2004). "Æthelred [Ethelred] I (d. 871)". Oxford Dictionary of National Biography (online ed.). Oxford University Press. doi:10.1093/ref:odnb/8913. (Subscription, Wikipedia Library access or UK public library membership required.)
- Molyneaux, George (2015). The Formation of the English Kingdom in the Tenth Century. Oxford University Press. ISBN 978-0-1910-2775-8.
- Nares, Robert (1859). A Glossary; or Collection of Words, Phrases, Names and Allusions to Customs, Proverbs, etc., Which Have Been Thought to Require Illustration in the Works of English Authors, Particularly Shakespeare and His Contemporaries. London: John Russel Smith. p. 160. OL 44953520M.
- Nelson, Janet (1999). Rulers and Ruling Families in Early Medieval Europe. Aldershot: Ashgate. ISBN 0-8607-8802-4.
- Nelson, Janet (2003). "Alfred's Carolingian Contemporaries". In Reuter, Timothy (ed.). Alfred the Great. Aldershot, UK: Ashgate. pp. 293–310. ISBN 978-0-7546-0957-5.
- Nelson, Janet (2004). "Æthelwulf (d. 858)". Oxford Dictionary of National Biography (online ed.). Oxford University Press. doi:10.1093/ref:odnb/8921. (Subscription, Wikipedia Library access or UK public library membership required.)
- Orosius, Paulus; Hampson, Robert Thomas (1855). A Literal Translation of King Alfred's Anglo-Saxon Version of the Compendious History of the World. Longman. p. 16.
- Parker, Joanne (2007). 'England's Darling'. Manchester: Manchester University Press. ISBN 978-0-7190-7356-4.
- Paul, Suzanne (2015). "Alfred the Great's Old English translation of Gregory the Great's Pastoral Care (MS Ii.2.4)". Cambridge Digital Library. Archived from the original on 3 July 2015.
- Phillips, Andrew (7 November 2016). "THE SYNAXIS OF ALL SAINTS OF BRITAIN AND IRELAND". Orthodox Christianity.
- Plummer, Charles (1911). "Alfred the Great". Encyclopedia Britannica. Vol. 1. pp. 582–584.
- Pollard, Justin (2006). 'Alfred the Great - The Man Who Made England'. London: John Murray. ISBN 978-0719566660.
- Pratt, David (2007). The political thought of King Alfred the Great. Cambridge Studies in Medieval Life and Thought: Fourth Series. Vol. 67. Cambridge University Press. ISBN 978-0-5218-0350-2.
- Preston, Richard A; Wise, Sydney F; Werner, Herman O (1956). Men in Arms: A History of Warfare and Its Interrelationships with Western Society. New York: Frederick A. Praeger.
- Ranft, Patricia (2012). How the Doctrine of Incarnation Shaped Western Culture. Plymouth, England: Lexington Books. ISBN 978-0-7391-7432-6.
- Ross, David (11 October 2016). "Statue of King Alfred the Great". BritainExpress. Archived from the original on 11 October 2016.
- Savage, Anne (1988). Anglo-Saxon Chronicles. Papermac. p. 288. ISBN 0-3334-8881-4.
- Schepss, G. (1895). "Zu König Alfreds Boethius". Archiv für das Studium der neueren Sprachen und Literaturen (in German). 94: 149–160.
- Sedgefield, W.J. (1900). King Alfred's version of the Consolations of Boethius. Oxford: Clarendon Press.
- Smyth, Alfred P. (1995). King Alfred the Great. Oxford: Oxford University Press. ISBN 0-1982-2989-5.
- Stenton, Frank M. (1971). Anglo-Saxon England (3rd ed.). Oxford: Oxford University Press. ISBN 978-0-1928-0139-5.
- Swanton, Michael, ed. (2000). The Anglo-Saxon Chronicles. London, UK: Phoenix. ISBN 978-1-8421-2003-3.
- Tait, James (1999). The Medieval English Borough. Manchester: Manchester University Press. ISBN 0-7190-0339-3.
- Townsend, Ian (3 January 2008). "Statue damage quiz man bailed". Wantage Herald. Archived from the original on 2 July 2017.
- Wall, James Charles (1900). Alfred the Great: His Abbeys of Hyde, Athelney and Shaftesbury. E. Stock. p. https://books.google.com/books?id=FMAsAAAAMAAJ&pg=PA78 78].
- Welch, Martin (1992). Anglo-Saxon England. London: English Heritage. ISBN 0-7134-6566-2.
- Whitelock, Dorothy, ed. (1996). English historical documents. Volume 1, C. 500–1042 (2nd ed.). Routledge. ISBN 978-0-2034-3950-0.
- Winchester Museums Service (4 December 2009). "Summary of Hyde Community Archaeology Project (completed in 1999)". Winchester Council. Archived from the original on 13 July 2010.
- Woodruff, Douglas (1993). The Life And Times of Alfred the Great. London, UK: Weidenfeld and Nicolson. ISBN 978-0-2978-3194-5.
- Wormald, Patrick (2001) [1999]. The Making of English Law: King Alfred to the Twelfth Century. Wiley. p. 528. ISBN 978-0-6312-2740-3.
- Wormald, Patrick (2006). "Alfred [Ælfred] (848/9–899)". Oxford Dictionary of National Biography (online ed.). Oxford University Press. doi:10.1093/ref:odnb/183. (Subscription, Wikipedia Library access or UK public library membership required.)
- Yorke, Barbara (1990). Kings and Kingdoms of Early Anglo-Saxon England. London, UK: Routledge. ISBN 978-0-4151-6639-3.
- Yorke, Barbara (1995). Wessex in the early Middle Ages. Leicester: Leicester University Press. ISBN 978-0-7185-1856-1.
- Yorke, Barbara (1999). "Alfred the Great: The Most Perfect Man in History?". History Today. Archived from the original on 9 February 2016.
- Yorke, Barbara (2001). "Alfred, king of Wessex (871–899)". In Lapidge, Michael; et al. (eds.). The Blackwell Encyclopaedia of Anglo-Saxon England. Blackwell Publishing. pp. 27–28. ISBN 978-0-6311-5565-2.
- Yorke, Barbara (2004). "Cerdic (fl. 6th cent.)". Oxford Dictionary of National Biography (online ed.). Oxford University Press. doi:10.1093/ref:odnb/5003. (Subscription, Wikipedia Library access or UK public library membership required.)

Alfred the Great House of Wessex Born: c. 849 Died: 26 October 899
Regnal titles
Preceded by Æthelred	King of the West Saxons; 871–c. 886	Became king of the Anglo-Saxons
New title	King of the Anglo-Saxons c. 886–899	Succeeded by Edward the Elder
