= Gaini =

Anglo-Saxon tribe which occupied part of the kingdom of Mercia

The Gaini were an Anglo-Saxon tribe which occupied part of the kingdom of Mercia.

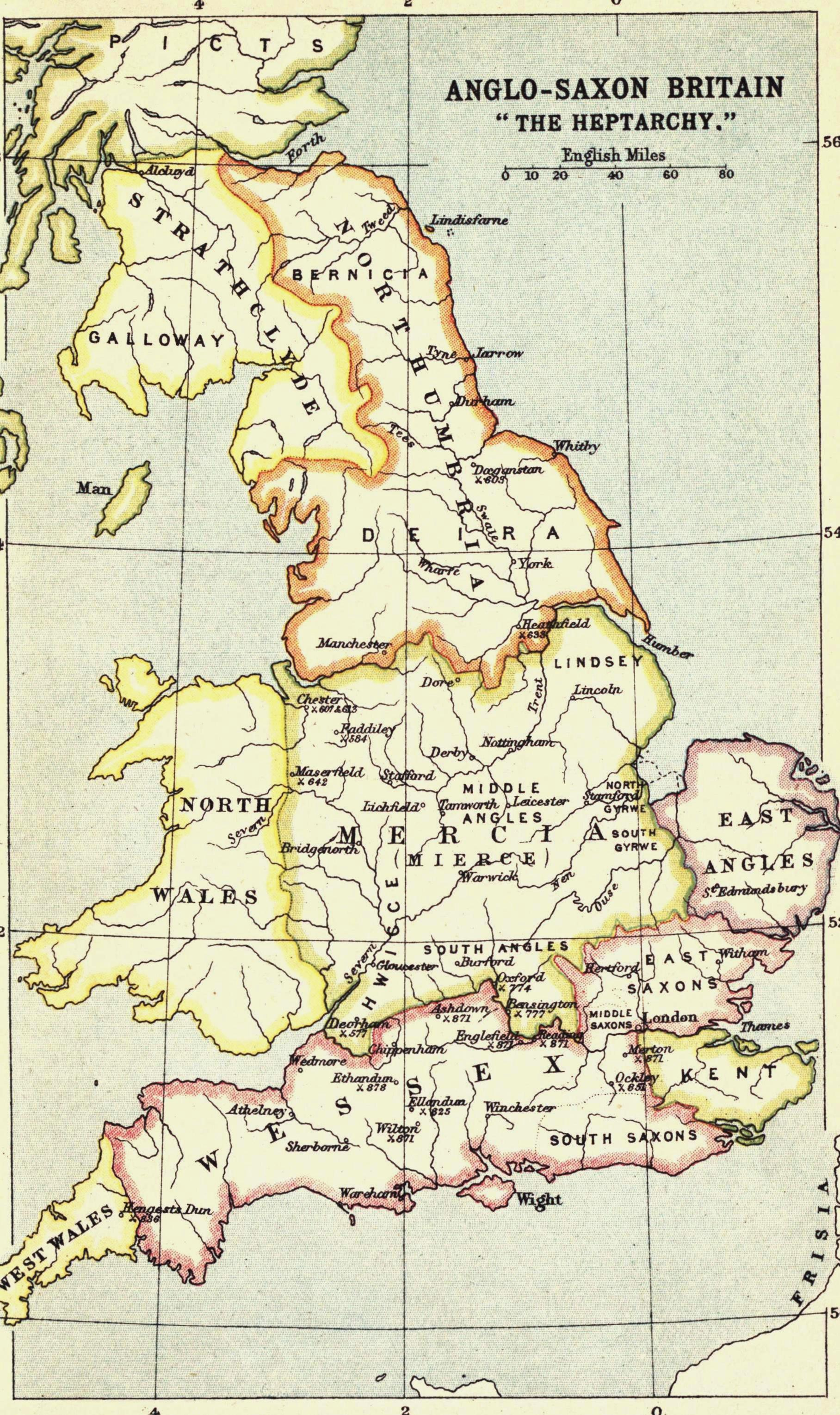
Map of Anglo-Saxon England

The Gaini are only recorded in Asser's life of King Alfred the Great, written in 893, which stated that in 868, before he became king, Alfred married Ealhswith, daughter of Æthelred, known as Mucel, ealdorman of the Gaini. Mucel witnessed Mercian charters between 814 and 866, with two subscribing in the 830s and 840s. They may be father and son, with the later one being Ealhswith's father. The older was probably "Mucel son of Esne" recorded in a Mercian charter of 836. Esne attested Mercian charters in the late eighth and early ninth centuries. Ealhswith's father attested two West Saxon charters in 868, the year his daughter married Alfred.

Ealhswith's brother, Æthelwulf, was a sub-ealdorman under Æthelred, Lord of the Mercians at the end of the ninth century, controlling western and possibly central Mercia.

== See also ==
- Gainsborough, Lincolnshire
