= Æthelgifu, Abbess of Shaftesbury =

Daughter of King Alfred the Great

Æthelgifu (Old English pronunciation: [ˈæðeljivu]; fl. 870s – 890s) was a daughter of Alfred the Great, King of Wessex. She was the third surviving child of the marriage between Alfred and Ealhswith in 868. Alfred's biographer, Asser, wrote that "Æthelgifu, devoted to God through her holy virginity, subject and consecrated to the rules of monastic life, entered the service of God'.

Asser recorded that Alfred founded Shaftesbury Abbey for nuns. It is not known when the abbey was founded, but it must be by 893 when Asser was writing. Alfred appointed Æthelgifu as its first abbess and she was joined by "many other noble nuns". Alfred granted the abbey one sixteenth of his royal revenues. According to a tradition recorded at the abbey, she adopted a religious life due to ill health.

In Alfred's will he left Æthelgifu estates at Candover, probably Preston Candover, and Kingsclere, both in Hampshire. The estates do not appear to have ever been held by the abbey, and she may not have survived her father, who died in 899.

She is venerated in the Catholic Church, her feast day is 1 January.

== Sources ==
- Kelly, Susan, ed. (1996). Charters of Shaftesbury Abbey. Anglo-Saxon Charters. Oxford, UK: Oxford University Press for the British Academy. ISBN 978-0-19-726151-4.
- Keynes, Simon; Lapidge, Michael, eds. (1983). Alfred the Great: Asser's Life of King Alfred & Other Contemporary Sources. London, UK: Penguin Classics. ISBN 978-0-14-044409-4.
