= Æthelswith =

Queen of Mercia

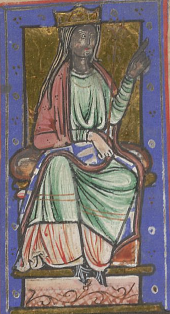
Æthelswith in a thirteenth-century cartulary for Abingdon Abbey

Æthelswith (c. 838–888) was the only known daughter of King Æthelwulf of Wessex. She married King Burgred of Mercia in 853. The couple had no known children.

Although it is unclear to what extent, Æthelswith wielded some power as a queen in her own right. In 868 she witnessed a West Saxon charter and made a grant of fifteen hides of land in her own name in Berkshire, rare for a queen of the period to do so.

== Death ==
In 874, after the Vikings drove Burgred from the kingdom and conquered Mercia, Æthelswith accompanied her husband into exile along with an entourage of five men and three women by the following names: Ealhmund (or Alhmund), Ealdwulf, Æthelwulf, Æthelred, Eadburh, Wulfswith, Ælfswith, and a second Æthelwulf. Burgred died in exile shortly after they settled in Rome, where he is buried in the church of St Mary. Æthelswith survived him by approximately fourteen years before dying while on a pilgrimage in Pavia in 888 and was buried in the monastery of San Felice.
