= Chrisom =

Infant face-covering or shroud

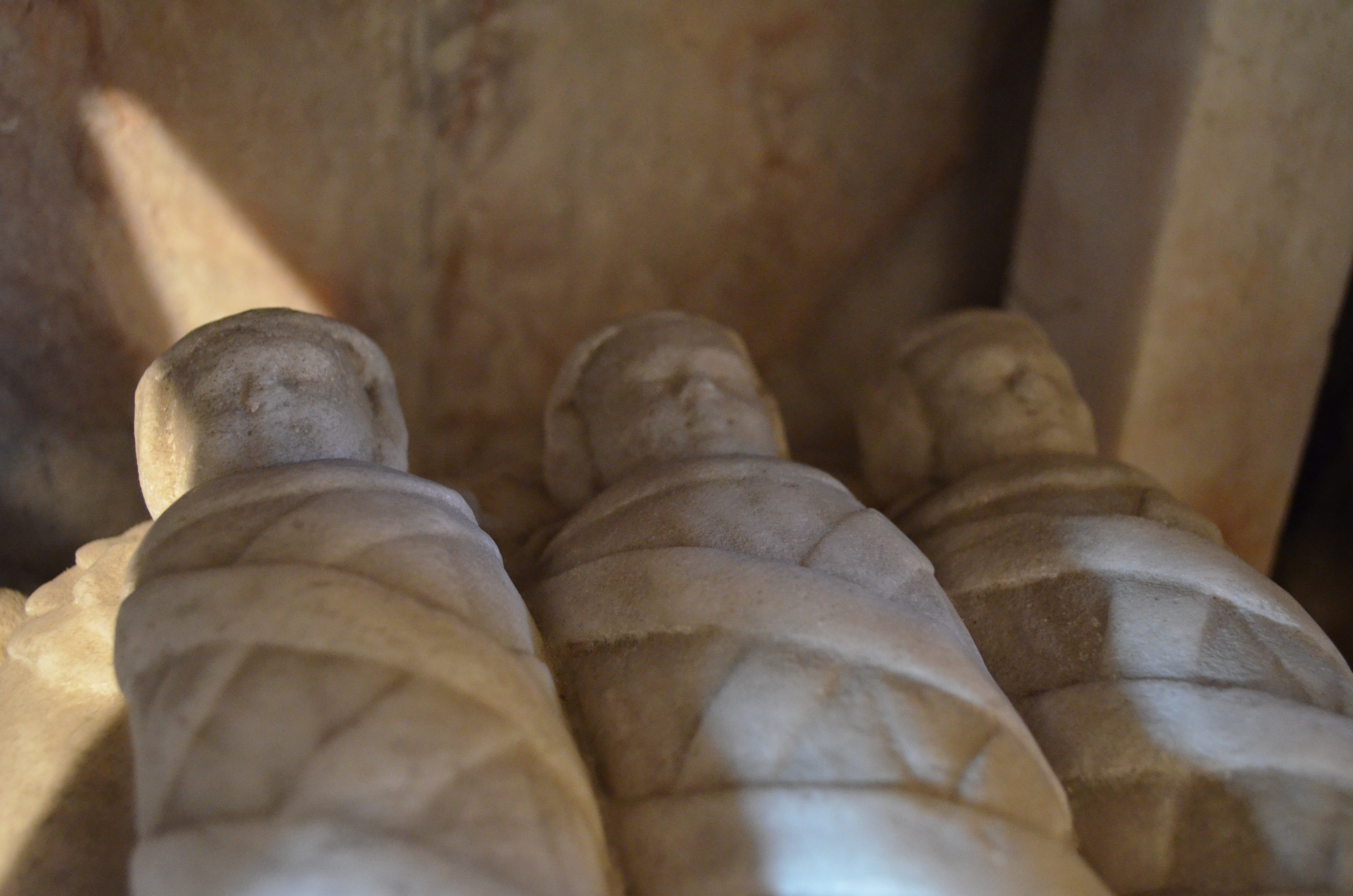
- Part of a monument showing three chrisom swaddled babies
- Material type: Face-cloth

Anciently, a chrisom, or "chrisom-cloth," was the face-cloth, or piece of linen laid over a child's head during baptism or christening. Originally, the purpose of the chrisom-cloth was to keep the chrism, a consecrated oil, from accidentally rubbing off. With time, the word's meaning changed, to that of a white mantle thrown over the whole infant at the time of baptism. The term has come to refer to a child who died within a month after its baptism—so called for the chrisom cloth that was used as a shroud for it. Additionally, in London's bills of mortality, the term chrisom was used to refer to infants who died within a month after being born.
