= Kingsclere =

Village and parish in Hampshire, England

Coordinates: 51.3260°N 1.2442°W

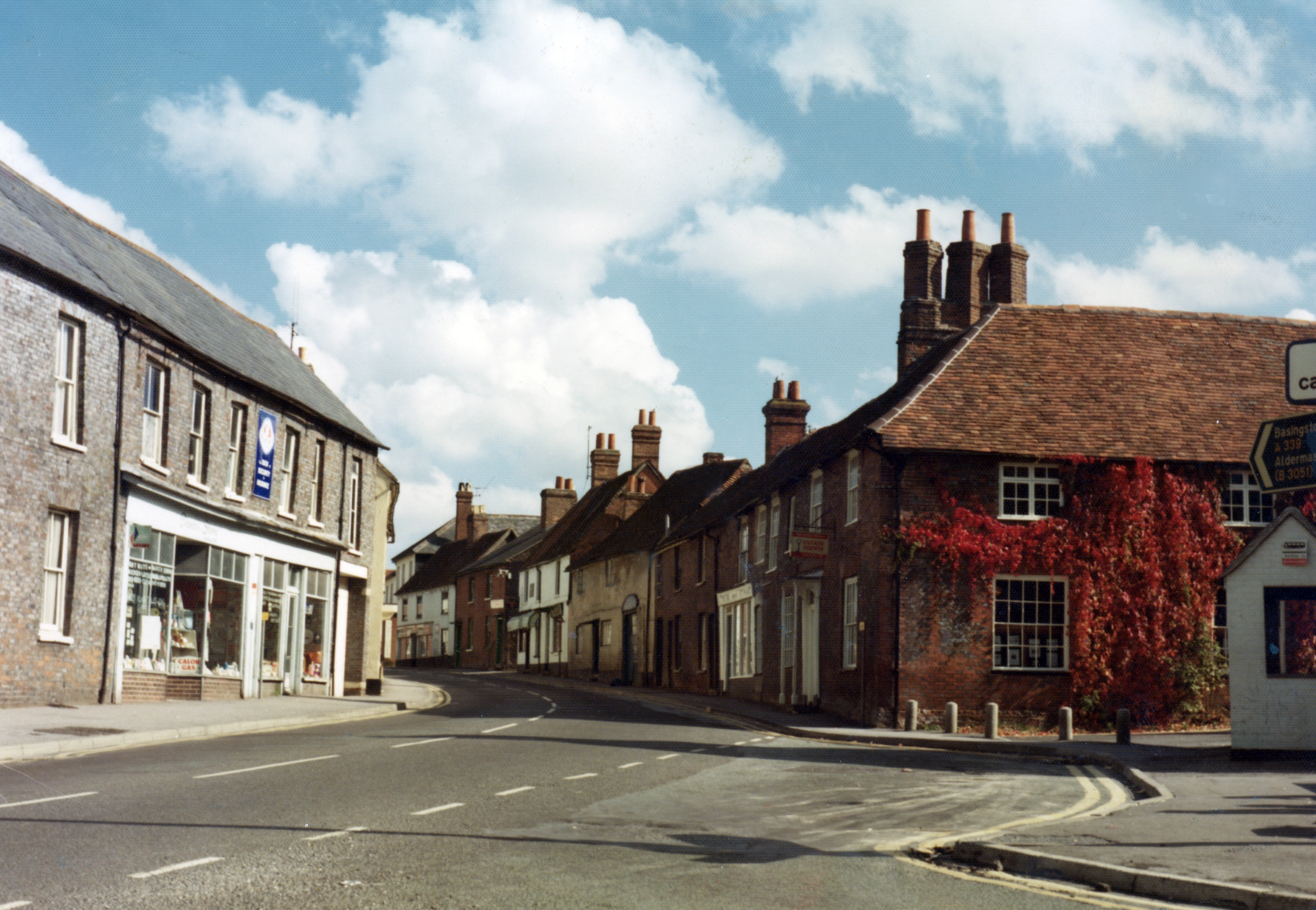
- George Street

- Location within Hampshire
- Population: 3,164
- OS grid reference: SU527588
- Civil parish: Kingsclere
- District: Basingstoke and Deane
- Shire county: Hampshire
- Region: South East
- Country: England
- Sovereign state: United Kingdom
- Post town: NEWBURY
- Postcode district: RG20
- Dialling code: 01635
- Police: Hampshire and Isle of Wight
- Fire: Hampshire and Isle of Wight
- Ambulance: South Central
- UK Parliament: North West Hampshire

Kingsclere is a large village and civil parish in Hampshire, England.

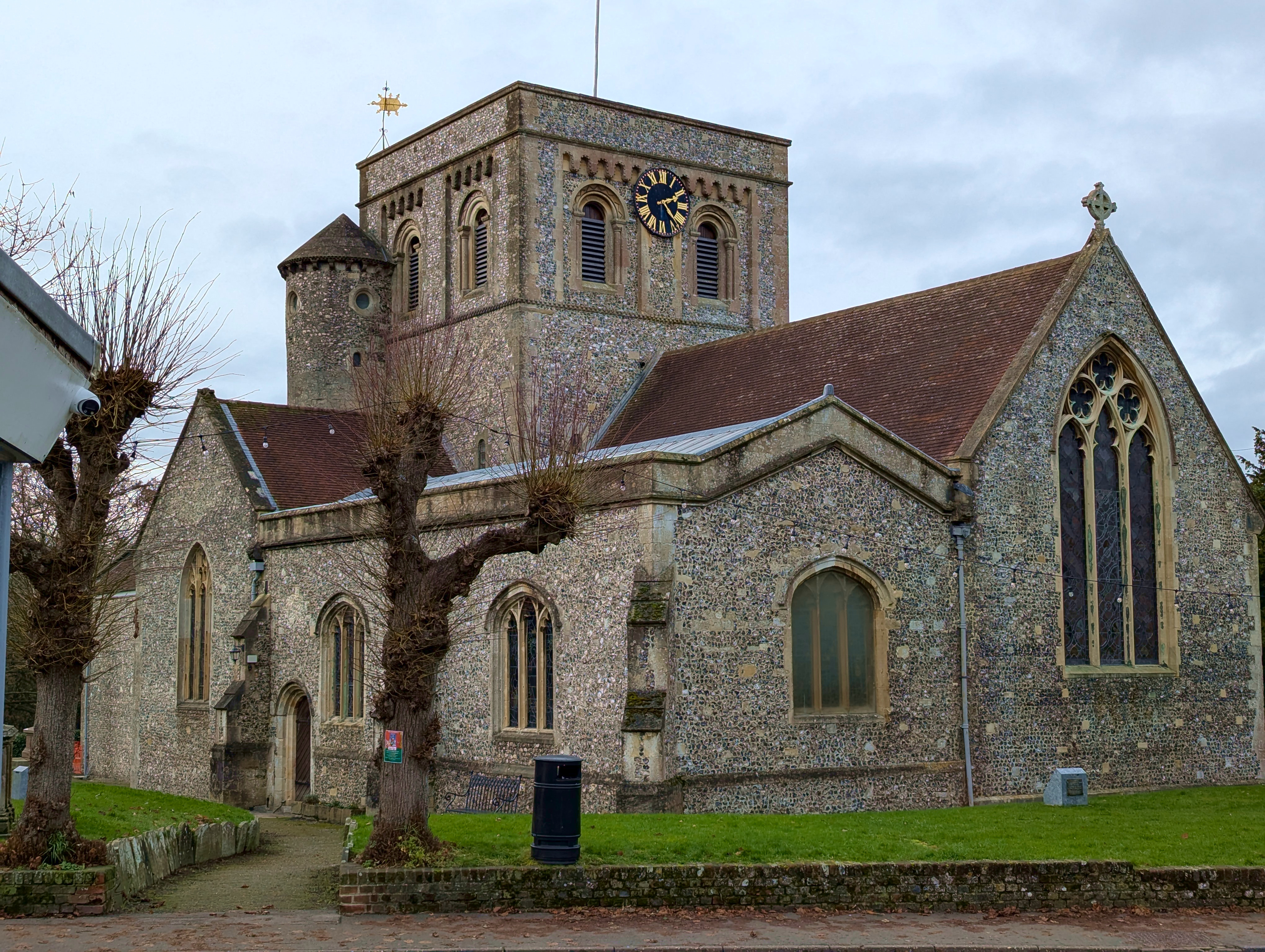
The Church of England parish church of St. Mary's in Kingsclere, Hampshire, England - viewed from the south east. December 2024.

At the centre of the village is the Church of England parish church of St. Mary.

== Geography ==
Kingsclere is approximately equidistant 13 kilometres (8.1 mi) from the towns of Basingstoke and Newbury on the A339 road.

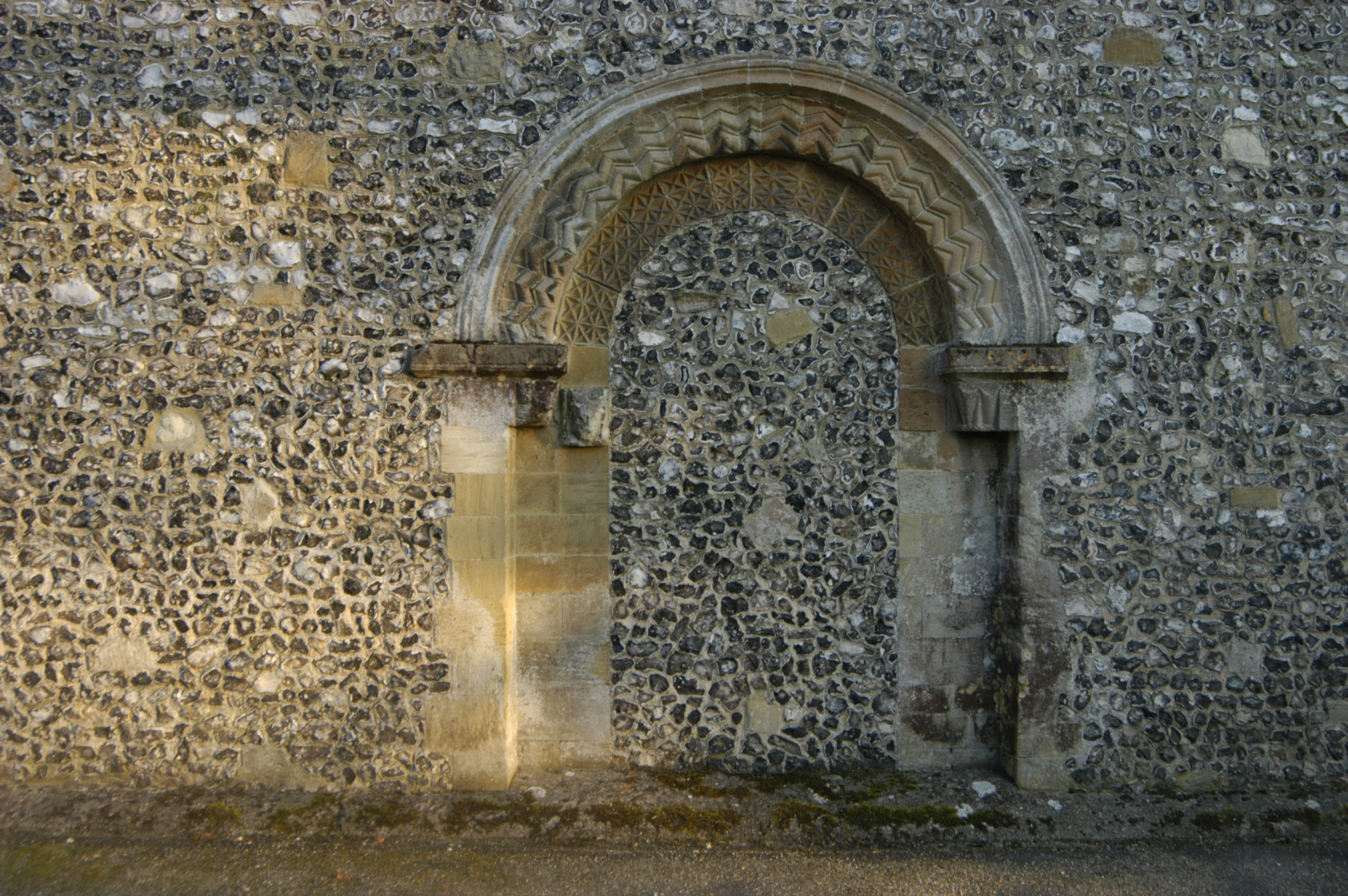
Filled in Norman, (c. 1130–1140), northern doorway of St. Mary's church. (Flint re-facing is c. 1848).

== History ==
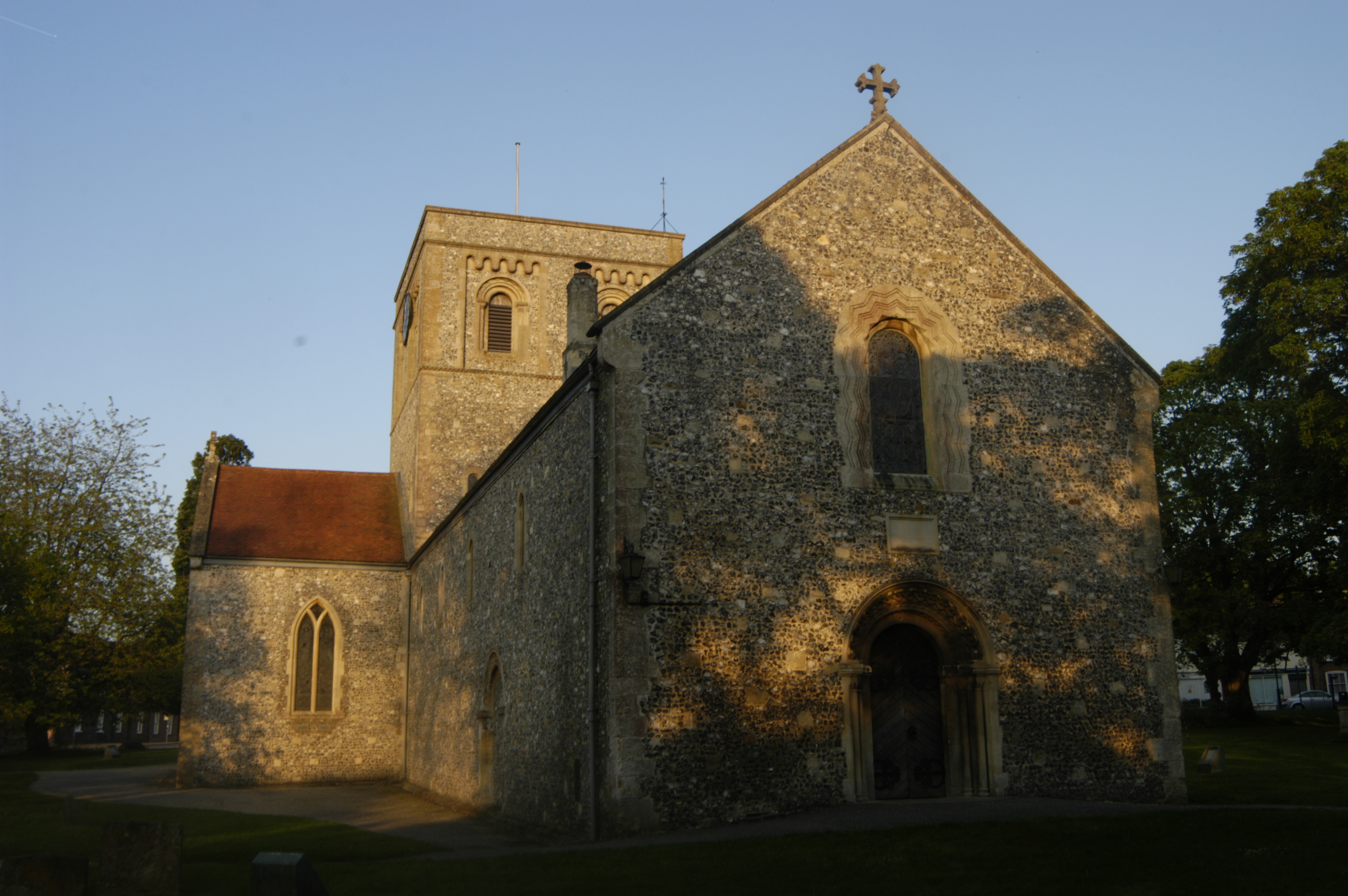
Church of St. Mary, from the west, (May 2014).

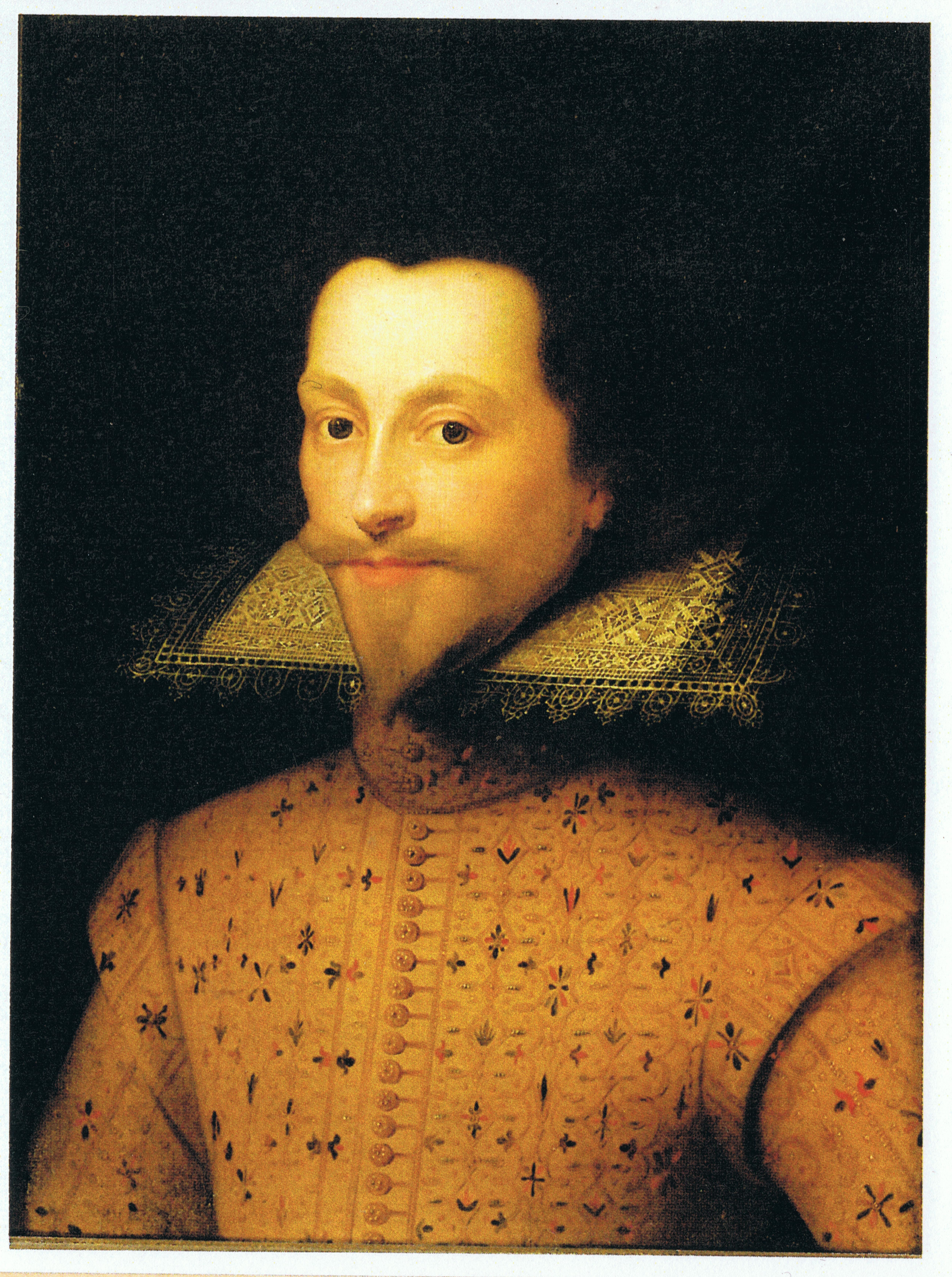
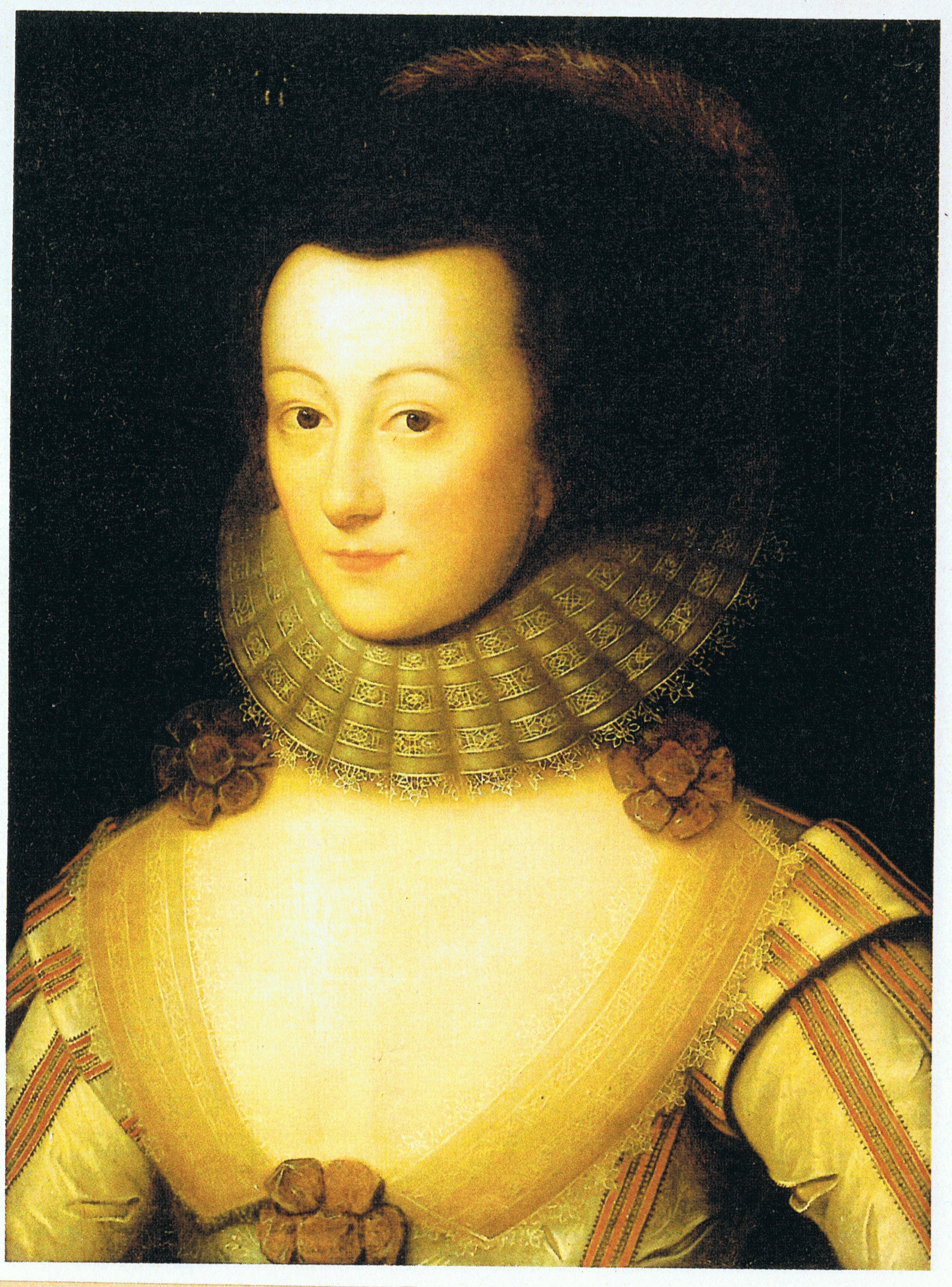
Portraits of Sir Henry Kingsmill (1587-1625), of Sydmonton, and his wife Bridget (died 1670) by William Larkin. (Oil on panel, 23 x 17 inches). A massive tomb in their honour is in the church.

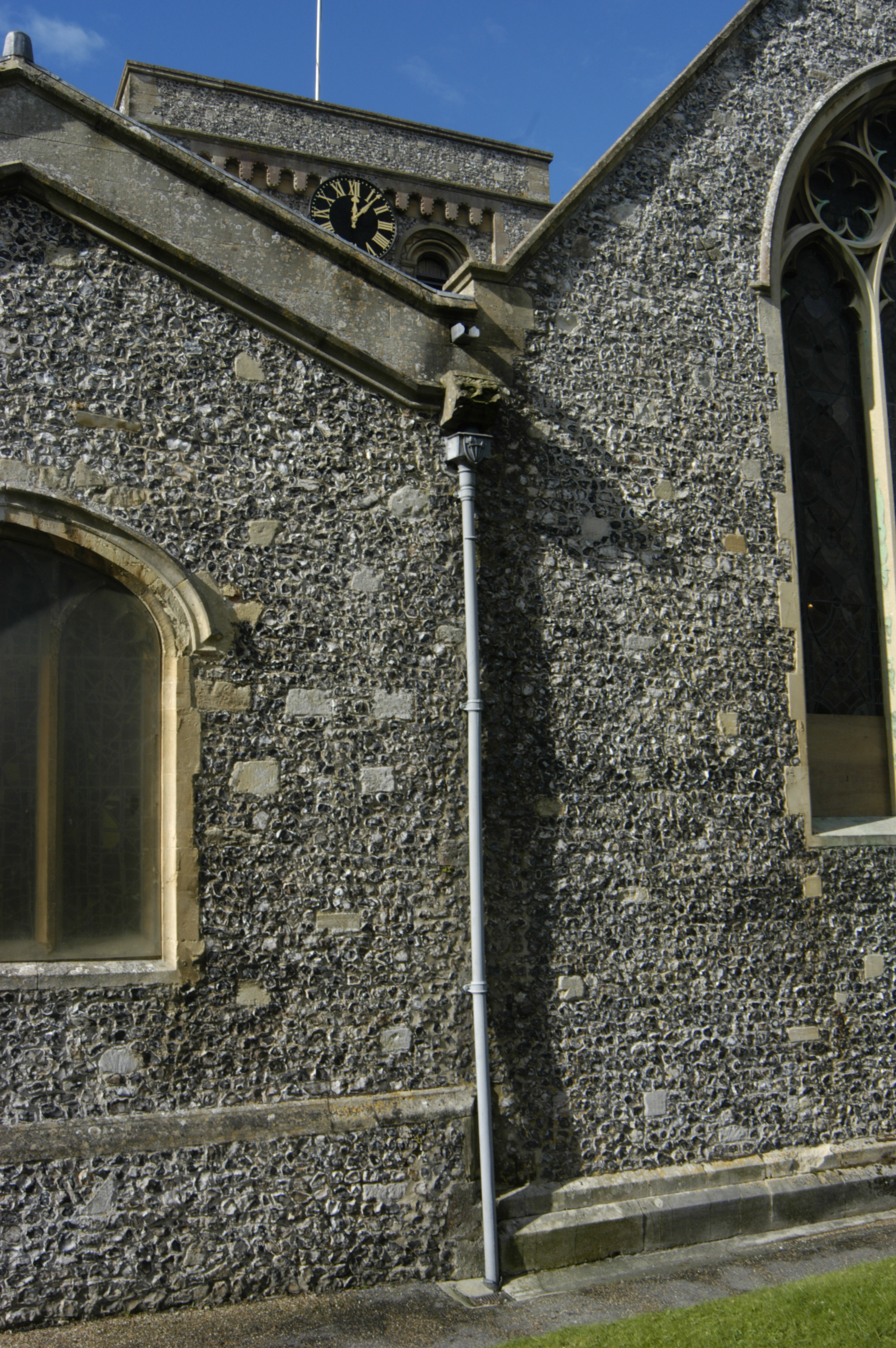
Eastern end of St Mary's Church in October 2014, showing a gutter marked with the Orde-Powlett shield.

Plan of the church of St. Mary.

Kingsclere can trace back its history to a place identified as belonging to King Alfred in his will between 872 and 888, the 'clere' possibly meaning 'bright' or 'clearing'.
Kingsclere formed part of the ancient demesne of the Crown. In his will King Alfred left Kingsclere for life to his second daughter, Ethelgiva, Abbess of Shaftesbury, and there are other mentions of it in Saxon charters. In 931 King Athelstan at a Witenagemot at Colchester granted 10 hides of land at Clere to Abbot Aelfric, and in 943 King Edmund bestowed 15 hides of land at Clere on the 'religious woman Aelfswith'. While sixteen years later King Edgar gave his thegn Aelfwine 10 hides of land at West Clere.

Local legend asserts that King John was troubled by a bedbug during a night in a Kingsclere inn, when prevented by fog from reaching his lodge at Freemantle Park on Cottington's hill. He ordained that the church should erect and evermore maintain upon its tower a representation of the creature that had disturbed his sleep. It is recorded that King John stayed at Freemantle Park on 8 and 9 September 1204

=== The 'Kingsclere Massacre' ===
On 5 October 1944, 10 American soldiers belonging to a US Army engineering support group based at Sydmonton Court nearby, broke bounds to visit The Swan public house, but were ordered back by two members of military police (MP). On their return to base, the soldiers broke into the armoury, then returned to the village and laid siege to The Crown public house, where the two MPs were drinking. Both MPs were killed, as was the pub landlady.

== Fairs ==
In 1218, the king ordered that the market which had been held in Kingsclere on Sundays should in the future be held on Saturdays. Warner, writing in the 18th century, mentions a well-frequented market on Tuesdays, and fairs the first Tuesday in April and the first Tuesday after 10 October. In 1848 the market was still held on Tuesdays, but had fallen very much into disuse, only a few farmers meeting at the Swan Inn with samples, and it probably ceased altogether about 1850. The fairs continued (c. 1911) to be held—on Whit Tuesday for pleasure on Ashford Hill and the Tuesday after Old Michaelmas Day for hiring servants and pleasure in the market place.

== Inns ==
The former Falcon Inn, in Swan street, one of the oldest in Hampshire, is especially interesting as being at one time in the possession of William Warham, Archbishop of Canterbury, who in 1510 gave it to Winchester College upon trust for the maintenance and support of the scholars upon its foundation. The original 'Crowne' Inn is mentioned in the parish register in 1611 and the 'Golden Faucon' in 1628. The modern Crown Inn was built in 1853 and the Swan Inn dates back to well before 1848. Its sign proclaims it a 15th C. Rooming Inn.

== In popular culture ==
The nearby Watership Down is the setting for the 1972 novel of the same name by Richard Adams.

Watership Down was also the site of the 1982 World Field Archery Championship put on by the Overton Black Arrows archery club from the nearby village of Overton.

The actress Lavinia Fenton, most famous for her role as the first Polly Peachum in John Gay's The Beggar's Opera, was lover and then wife of Charles Powlett, 3rd Duke of Bolton of the parish. Their eldest son, Rev. Charles Powlett, was briefly vicar of Kingsclere.

== People from and associated with Kingsclere ==
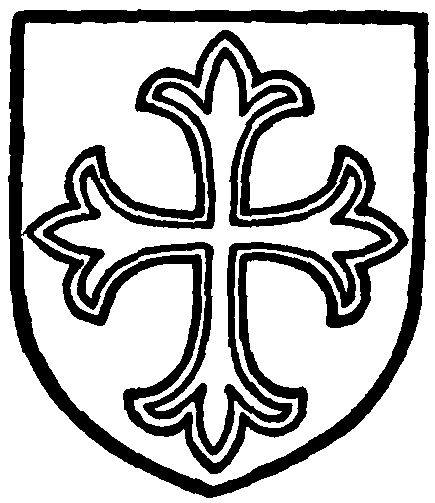
Melton family shield. Argent a cross paty voided azure.

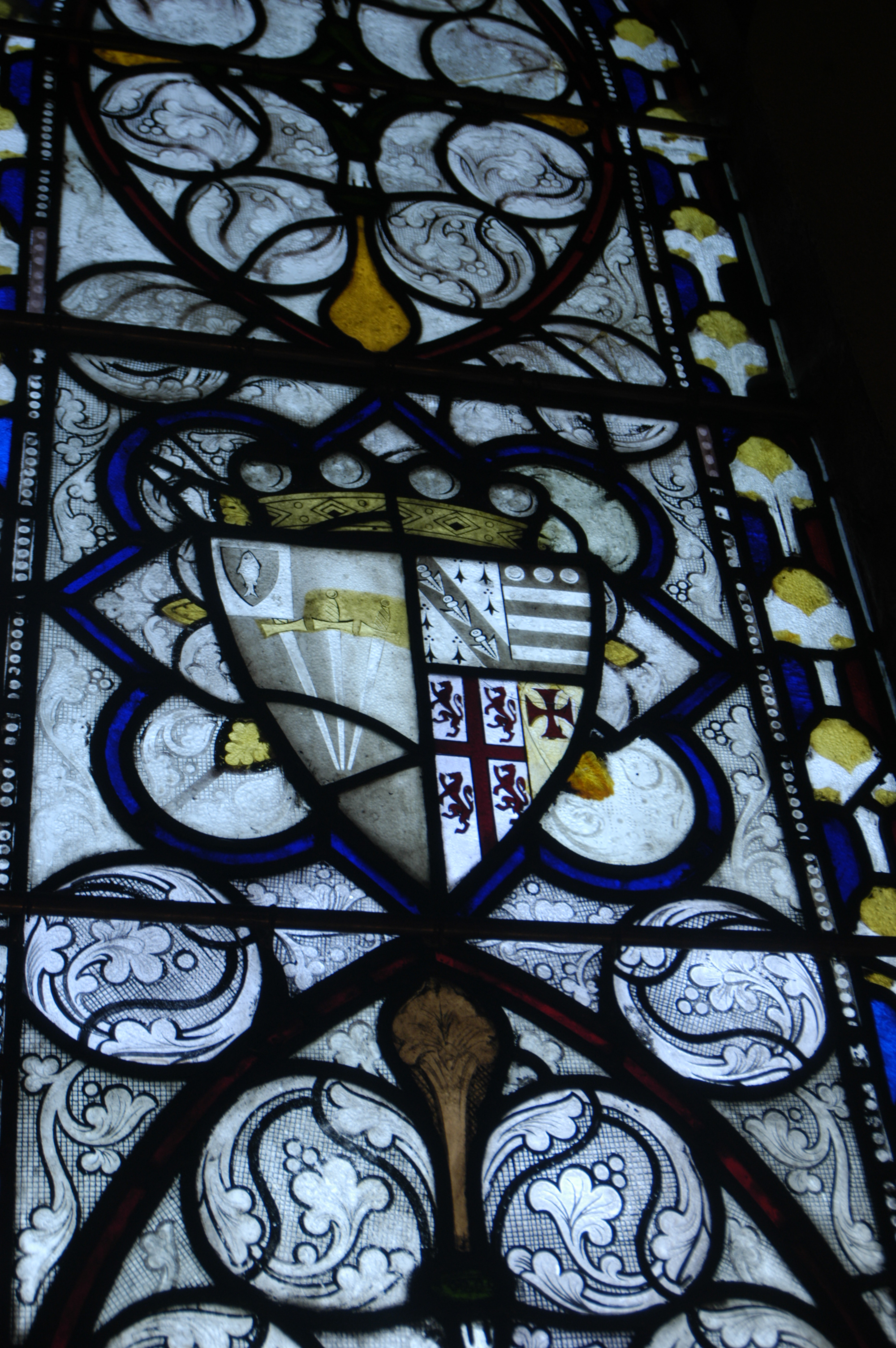
Kingsclere, 1848 shield, Orde-Powlett impaling Carleton for William Orde-Powlett, 2nd Baron Bolton (1782–1850) and his wife (married 1810) Hon Maria Carleton (1777-1863), daughter of Guy Carleton, 1st Baron Dorchester.

- Edith of Wessex (c. 1025 – 18 December 1075) Queen Edith, widow of Edward the Confessor.
- Rosamund Clifford, the fair Rosamund, (before 1150 – c. 1176), a royal mistress, stayed at the royal residence at Tidgrove, on the southern side of the parish.
- John de Lancelevy, lord of the manor of Hannington.
- Peter Fitz Herbert, lord of the manors of North Oakley and Wolverton, held the church after Hyde Abbey.
- Ranulf de Broc (sometimes Rannulf de Broc; died around 1179), and his son-in-law Stephen of Thornham (died c. 1214), possessors of the manor of Frobury (Frollebury).
- Walter de Coutances, Walter of Rouen (died 1207), Anglo-Norman bishop of Lincoln and archbishop of Rouen.
- King John (died 1216).
- Richard of Cornwall, encaustic tiles bearing his symbols used to be in the chancel aisle.
- William Melton (died 1340), 43rd Archbishop of York (1317–1340), held the manor of Kingsclere. Sir William Melton (died 1362), the nephew, obtained a grant of free warren in his demesne lands of Kingsclere in 1346, and was succeeded by his son, Sir William de Melton (MP for Yorkshire) who died in 1399.
- William Montagu, 1st Earl of Salisbury, to whom the advowson was sold for 500 marks by Edward III in 1336. He then passed it onto the monastery of Bisham.
- Pope Clement VI (1291–1352), (Pope 1342–1352), previously Peter, archbishop of Rouen 1331–1338, a.k.a. Peter III Roger de Beaufort. Although he never visited Kingsclere, he did own it as Bishop of Rouen.
- William of Wykeham, (died 1404), bishop and local magnate (Burghclere, Highclere and Earlstone).
- William Fauconer (died 1412), JP (Hants, 1407–1412), MP for Hampshire, 1407 and 1411, buried in St. Mary's.
- Anne of Cleves, rectory and the advowson of the vicarage of Kingsclere fell again into the hands of the king, who in 1541 granted them to Anne of Cleves. On her death in 1557 they reverted to William, Marquess of Winchester.
- Sir George Darcy, 1544 sold the manor to Sir William Paulet, Lord St. John.
- Ingram Frizer, murderer of Christopher Marlowe. Born in Kingsclere 1561, died 1627.
- Mary Johnson, a Negro, buried Kingsclere, 18 May 1713.
- Various Dukes of Wellington owned some of Kingsclere and Wolverton. The great Duke of Wellington,(1769–1852), gave £300 towards the 1848 remodeling of the church.
- Sir James Lancaster VI (c. 1554-1618) was an Elizabethan trader, privateer and philanthropist. Endowed Kingsclere £30 per annum.
- Francis Cottington, 1st Baron Cottington (c. 1579 – 1652), possessor of Freemantle from 1631.
- Anne Finch, Countess of Winchilsea (1661–1720), Anne Kingsmill, a.k.a. Lady Finch, gave a pulpit cushion.
- William Mount (1753–1815) of Wasing Place and others conveyed North Oakley manor to Oliver Cromwell of Cheshunt Park, Hertfordshire, the last direct male descendant of Henry Cromwell, the Protector's fourth son, in 1787.
- Sir Wyndham Spencer Portal, 1st Bt., (1822–1905), of Laverstoke, local philanthropist who paid for some of church's 1848 re-fit. A younger brother of Melville Portal.
- Colonel Gervase Francis Newport Tinley, CB (1909), CMG. (Grahamstown, 1857 – Marseille, 18 February 1918).
- Sir Rowland Arthur Charles Sperling, KCMG, CB (1874–1965), was a British diplomat. HM Minister at Berne; Sofia, and then Finland.
- Colonel the Hon. George Hysteron-Proteron, CB (c. 1874–1942). Fictional character created by J. K. Stanford.
- Lt. Col. John Keith Stanford OBE MC (1892–1971), Stanton's farm. Soldier, civil servant, writer and part owner of Stanford's Ltd, cartographer.
- James Stanford, OBE, director general of the Leonard Cheshire Foundation, and organiser of the Liberty and Livelihood Countryside March, 2002. Grew up at Stanton's farm.
- Martin Evans (1904–1998), cricketer and Royal Navy sailor
- Ronald Alfred Goodwin, (1925–2003), composer, buried in St Paul's, Kingsclere Woodlands;
- David Wynne (1926 – 2014), OBE, sculptor, parents buried in St Paul's, Kingsclere Woodlands, and sculpture in the church;
- David Howell, Lord Howell of Guildford, opened the Kingsclere bypass on 13 September 1982.
- Rev. David Shearlock, vicar of Kingsclere, 1964–1971;
- Andrew Lloyd Webber, Lord Lloyd-Webber lives at Sydmonton Court, near Kingsclere.
- Tom Croft England International Rugby Player grew up in Kingsclere.
- Ralph Dellor, (1948 – 2017), cricket journalist.
- Kit Malthouse, sitting MP for North-West Hampshire, which includes Kingsclere.
- Stained glass in the Sanctuary, South Chapel, Chancel Aisle, Kingsmill Room by William Wailes (Transfiguration for Dr Thompson of Swan Street), and by Ward and Hughes (Marriage at Cana of Galilee).
- Daniel Hannan, Baron Hannan of Kingsclere
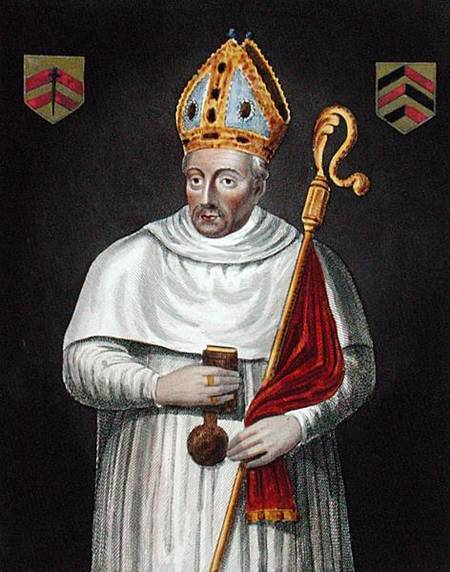
Walter Merton (died 1277). Rector in 1263 and founder of Merton College, Oxford.

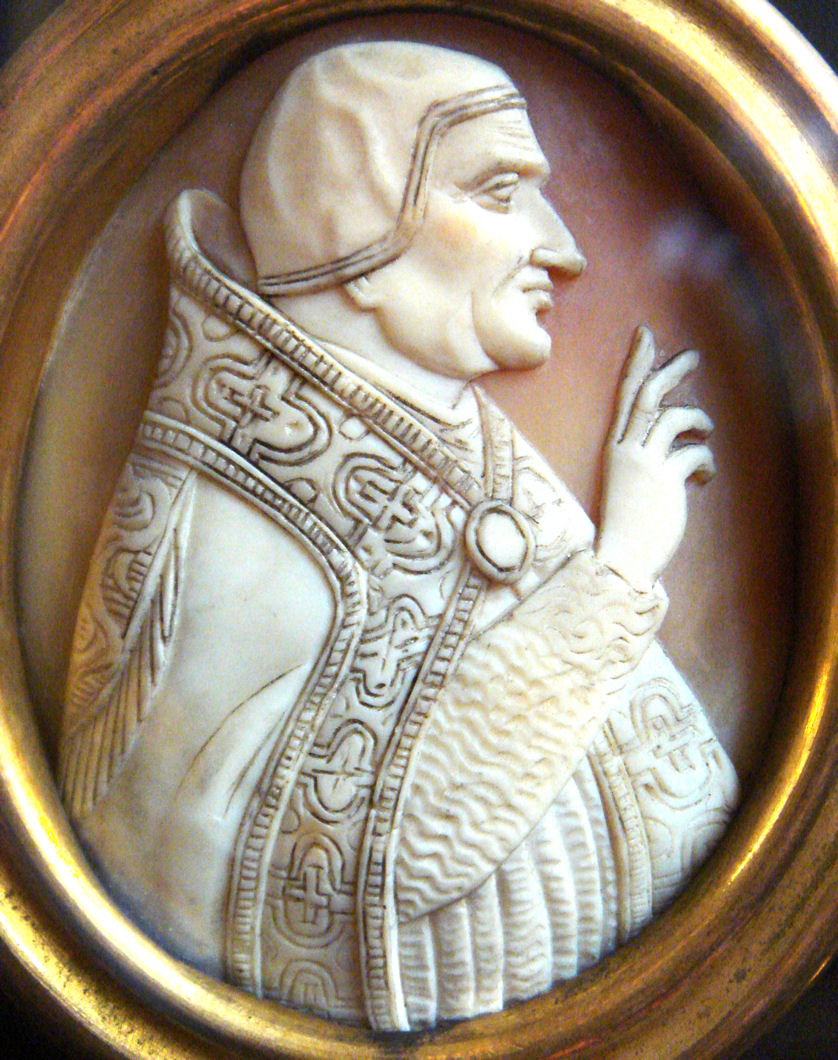
Kingsclere's Pope: Clement VI (1291–1352), previously Peter, archbishop of Rouen 1331–1338.

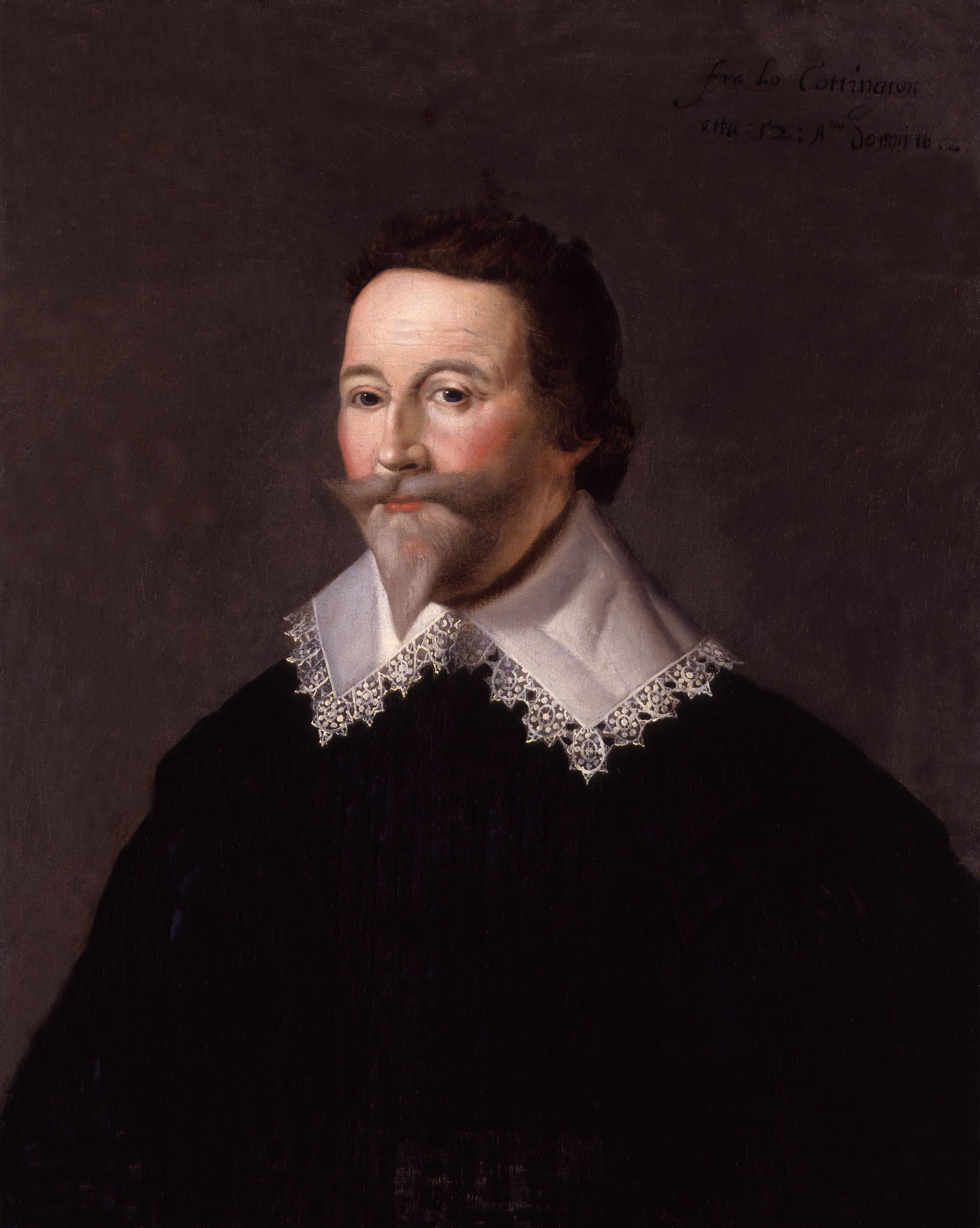
Lord Cottington (died 1652), of Cottington, Freemantle from 1631.

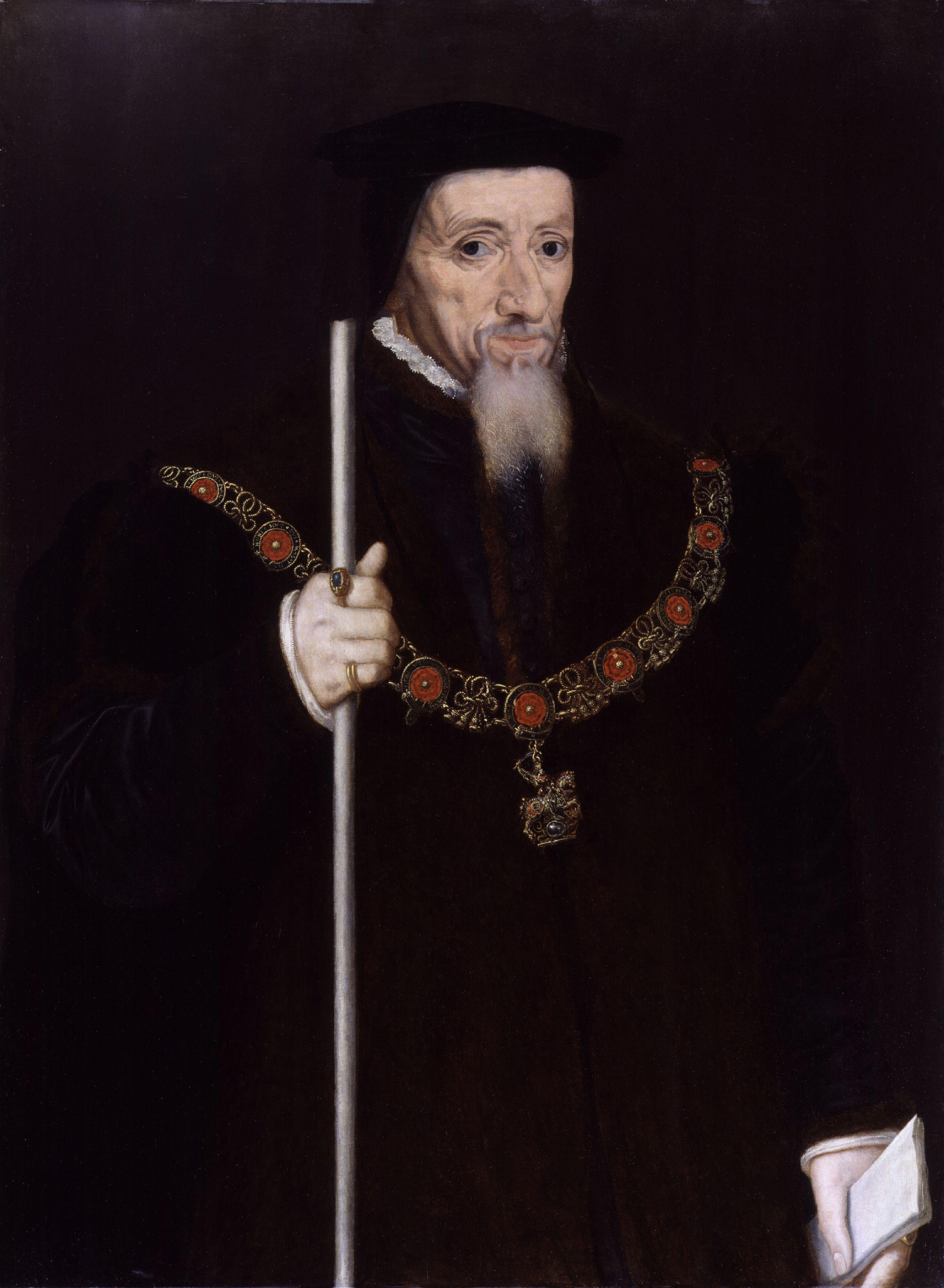
Lord St. John (a.k.a. Marquess of Winchester) bought Frobury manor in 1546 and Kingsclere circa 1544.

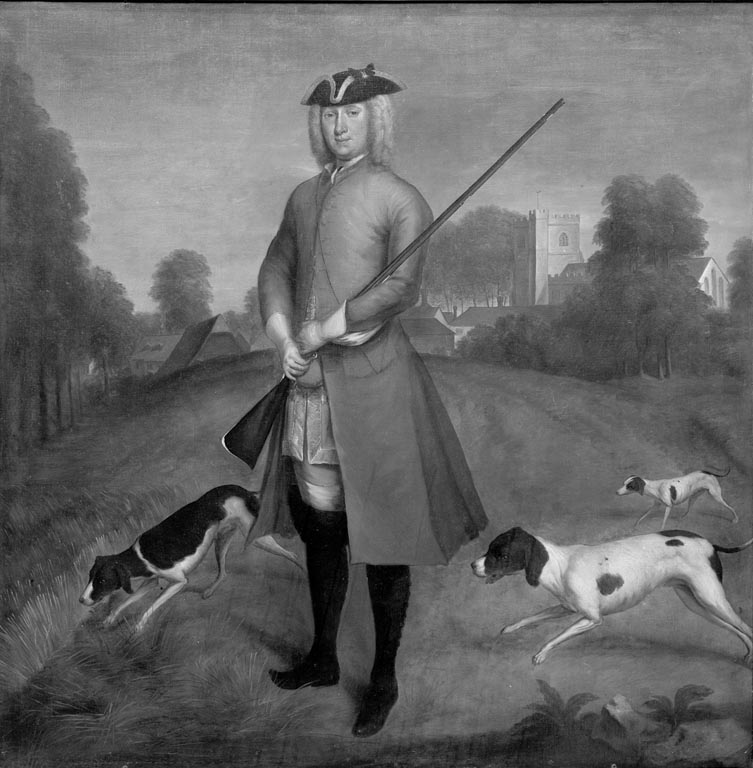
Lt-Gen. Charles Powlett (Paulet), 3rd Duke of Bolton & 8th Marquess of Winchester, KG, PC (1685–1754).

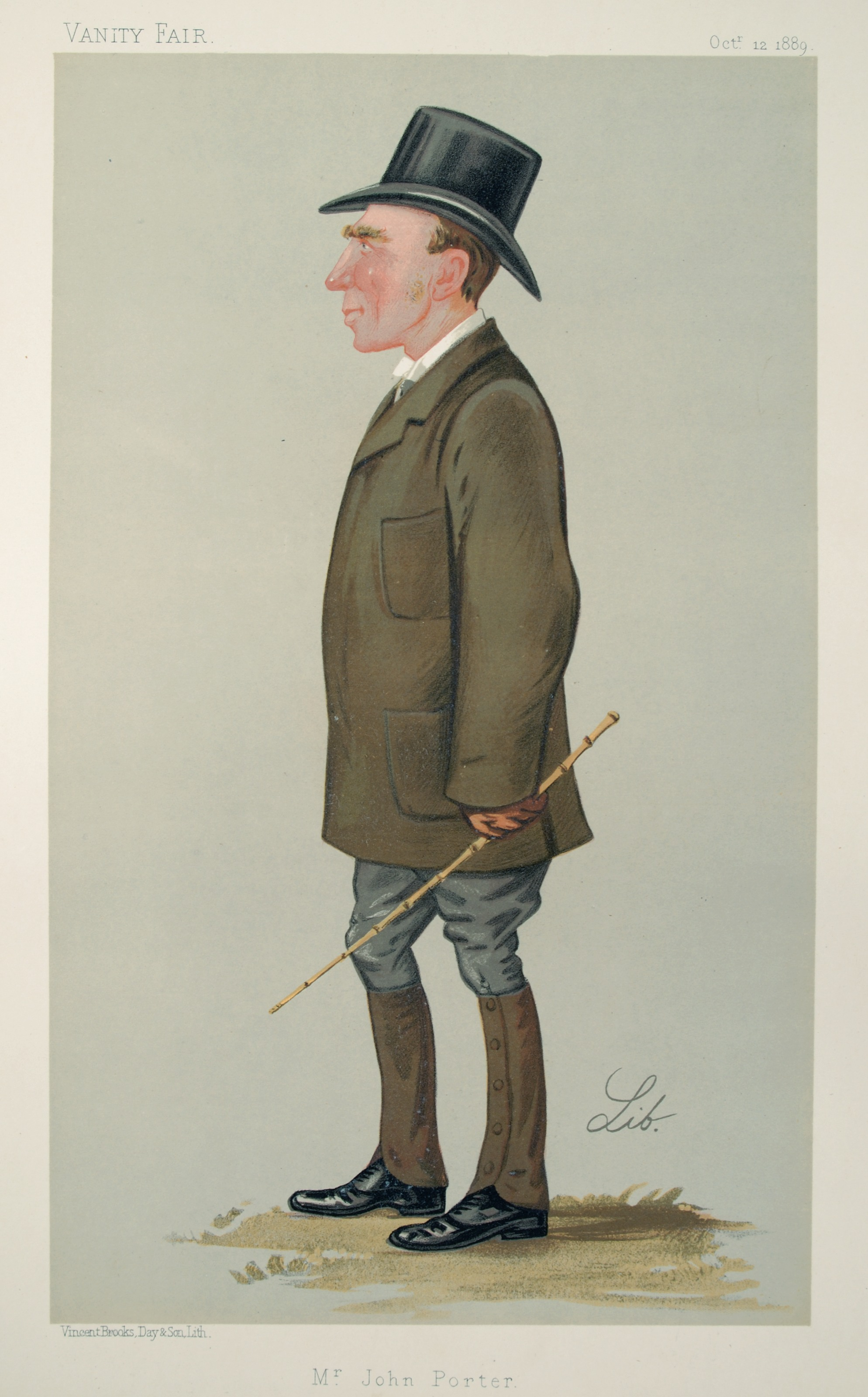
John Porter, who trained horses just south of Kingsclere, 1867–1905.

== Notable rectors ==
- Walter de Mertone, rector in 1263 and later Bishop of Rochester (c. 1205 – 27 October 1277), and founder of Merton College, Oxford.
- Robert de Wyville, rector 1326–29, then Bishop of Salisbury.
- John Drokensford (died 9 May 1329), sometime rector of Kingsclere, and later Bishop of Bath and Wells.
- Alexander de Bykenore (1260s? – 14 July 1349), sometime rector of Kingsclere, and then Archbishop of Dublin (1317–1349), Lord Treasurer of Ireland (1307–1309) and Lord Chancellor of Ireland.

=== Paulet/Powlett associations ===
- William Paulet, 1st Marquess of Winchester (c. 1485–1572), KG, a local magnate and statesman, of Old Basing and parts of Kingsclere.
- John Paulet, 5th Marquess of Winchester.
- Six Dukes of Bolton and their heirs, sometime patrons and owners of large parts of Kingsclere.
- The Reverend Charles Powlett, (1728–1809), Vicar of Kingsclere, 19 July 1769 – 15 February 1773. Chaplain to his nephew dukes of Bolton. Cricket pioneer.
- Thomas Orde-Powlett, 1st Baron Bolton, PC (1740–1807), MP (1780–1796). Governor of the Isle of Wight (1791–1807) and Lord Lieutenant of Hampshire (1800–1807), inherited (c. 1794) estates, including Hackwood Park, Bolton Castle and Bolton Hall, of the Dukes of Bolton through his wife, Jean Mary Browne-Powlett, love-child, natural, illegitimate daughter of Charles Powlett, 5th Duke of Bolton KB, PC (c. 1718 – 1765).
- William Orde-Powlett, 2nd Lord Bolton (1782–1850) married (1810) Hon Maria Carleton (1777-1863), daughter of Guy Carleton, 1st Baron Dorchester, KB (1724–1808). In 1848 Bolton gave £500 for the church's remodeling and £700 in particular for the chancel's restoration.
- Lady Algitha Orde-Powlett (1847–1919) (from 1895 Lady Bolton) daughter of Richard Lumley, 9th Earl of Scarbrough, who married (1868) Hon. William Orde-Powlett (1845–1922), FSA, from 1895 the 4th Lord Bolton.

== Racing associations ==
- Many of the Dukes of Bolton were dedicated breeders and owners of race-horses. For most of the eighteenth century they had a race-course at nearby Kempshott.
- Sir Francis Blake Delaval, KB (1727–1771), M.P. for Andover 1754–1768, married (1750), Lady Isabella Powlett, widow of Lord Nassau Powlett, M.P., son of second Duke of Bolton. Lived occasionally at Cannon Heath.
- John Savile, 1st Earl of Mexborough (1719–1778), at Cannon Heath, where in 1766 Samuel Foote had his famous leg injury as a result of horse-play. Foote wrote many letters to David Garrick from Cannon Heath.
- Duke of Cumberland (1745–1790), had some horses at Cannon Heath.
- Sir John Lade, 2nd Baronet (1759–1838), lived occasionally at Cannon Heath circa 1805.
- Sir Joseph Henry Hawley, 3rd Baronet (1813–75), racehorse owner, (operated in converted farm buildings at Cannons Heath, with a young John Porter employed as his private trainer, and later built a new yard in 1867).
- John Wells (1833–1873), a.k.a. Wells the jockey.
- John Porter, (1838–1922), great racehorse trainer, brought to Kingsclere by Hawley. Buried in St. Mary's churchyard. Church warden from 1899.
- William John Arthur Charles James Cavendish-Bentinck, 6th Duke of Portland, KG, GCVO, TD, PC, DL, (1857–1943).
- Frederick Stanley Butters (1888–1967), trained at Kingsclere 1934–1939, Park House stables then owned by Captain Arnold Stancomb Wills (1877–1961), of W.D. & H.O. Wills. (Brother of Frank Butters).
- Lawrence Lee (1909–2011), designed a stained glass window for Peter Hastings-Bass in Kingsclere;
- Evan Morgan Williams (1912–2001), jockey turned trainer. Sold the stables to Peter Hastings-Bass in 1953;
- Peter Robin Hood Hastings-Bass (1920–1964), trainer;
- Priscilla Victoria Hastings (1920–2010), owner and trainer. Director of The Tote. Daughter of Sir Malcolm Bullock (1890–1966), soldier and MP for Waterloo, 1923–1950, by Lady Victoria Stanley, daughter of Edward Stanley, 17th Earl of Derby (1865–1948), soldier, Conservative politician (MP & Peer), diplomat and racehorse owner.
- Ian Balding (1938–2026), trainer.
- William Edward Robin Hood Hastings-Bass, 17th Earl of Huntingdon, LVO (1948–), trainer.
- Clare Balding and her brother Andrew grew up in Kingsclere.

=== Some racehorses ===
- Eclipse (1764-1789), Orme (1889–1915), Isonomy (1875–1891), Blue Gown (1865–1880), Ormonde 1883–1904), Flying Fox (1896–1911), Friar's Balsam (1885–1899), La Fleche (1889–1916), Paradox (1882–1890), Shotover (1879–1898), Common (1888–1912), Winkipop (1907–1931), Mid-day Sun (1934–1954), Mill Reef (1968–1986), Casual Look (2000-).

== Other manors ==
Catts Farm, design by H. Launcelot Fedden (1869-1910), in 'The Building News', 31 July 1908, published by the Strand Newspaper Company Limited.

The manor of Frobury is the western part of the modern parish of Kingsclere. In addition to Frobury the manors of North Oakley, Hannington, Sydmonton, Edmundsthorp Benham (Headley, and Beenham Court or Cheam School) and Ecchinswell used to be a part of the parish of Kingsclere.

== Highclere, Kingsclere and Basingstoke Light Railway ==
The Highclere, Kingsclere and Basingstoke Light Railway was a proposed (circa 1896–1900) light railway connecting the Didcot, Newbury and Southampton Railway (DNSR) with the London and South Western Railway (LSWR). Despite public support of the railway proposal, sufficient funding was never obtained and the idea was abandoned.

== See also ==
- Highclere, Kingsclere and Basingstoke Light Railway, proposed in 1900 but never constructed
- Kingsclere and Whitchurch Rural District
- List of places in Hampshire
- List of civil parishes in Hampshire
