= Charles Paulet =

Charles Paulet may refer to:

- Charles Paulet, 1st Duke of Bolton (1630–1699), British peer
- Charles Paulet, 2nd Duke of Bolton (1661–1722), British peer
- Charles Powlett, 3rd Duke of Bolton (1685–1754), British peer
- Charles Powlett, 5th Duke of Bolton (1718–1765), British peer
- Charles Paulet, 13th Marquess of Winchester (1764–1843), British peer
- Charles Powlett, 2nd Baron Bayning (1785–1823), British peer and Tory Member of Parliament
- Charles Armand Powlett (c. 1694-1751), British soldier
- Charles Powlett (1728–1809), priest and patron of English cricket

== See also ==
- Paulet (surname)
