= Highclere (disambiguation) =

Highclere is a village and civil parish located in Hampshire, England.

Highclere may also refer to:

- Highclere, Tasmania, a locality near Burnie
- De Havilland Highclere, a single-engined 15-passenger biplane airliner introduced in 1925
- Highclere (horse) (1971–92), a British Thoroughbred racehorse owned by Queen Elizabeth II
- Highclere Castle, a country house in the Jacobethan style near Highclere, the main filming location for the British television period drama Downton Abbey and for the British comedy series Jeeves and Wooster with Stephen Fry and Hugh Laurie
- Highclere railway station, a former railway station near Highclere
- Highclere, Kingsclere and Basingstoke Light Railway, proposed in 1900 but never constructed
