= Burghclere railway station =

Disused railway station in Hampshire, England

Coordinates: 51.3176°N 1.3270°W

Burghclere
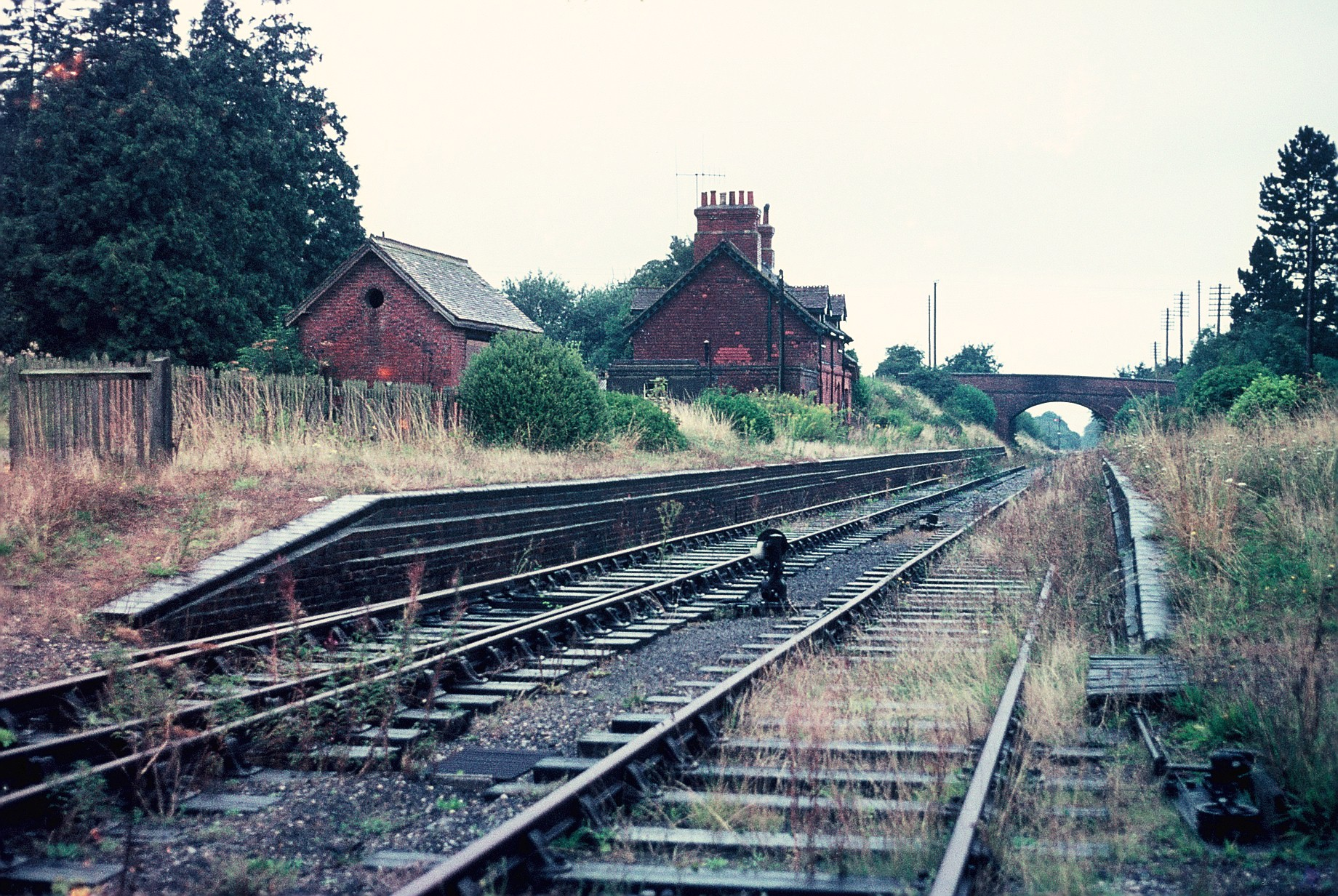
- Burghclere Station in 1966.

General information
- Location: Old Burghclere, Basingstoke and Deane; England
- Grid reference: SU470578
- Platforms: 2

Other information
- Status: Disused

History
- Original company: Didcot, Newbury and Southampton Railway
- Pre-grouping: Didcot, Newbury and Southampton Railway
- Post-grouping: Great Western Railway

Key dates
- 4 May 1885: Opened
- 4 August 1942: Closed
- 8 March 1943: Re-opened
- 7 March 1960: Closed
Location

Burghclere railway station (originally named Sydmonton) was a station on the Didcot, Newbury and Southampton Railway in England. It was further from the village of Burghclere than Highclere railway station but Burghclere station was relatively busy, serving the larger village of Kingsclere.

== Facilities ==
It was furnished with the usual two platforms, station buildings (on the northbound platform) and passing loop and there were additional sidings on both sides of the line and further private sidings on a curve to the south east servicing local lime kilns. A goods shed, standard crane and cattle pen was also built next to the siding on the Northbound line.

== Routes ==
Preceding station	Disused railways	Following station
Highclere; Line and station closed	Great Western Railway; Didcot, Newbury and Southampton Railway	Litchfield; Line and station closed
