= Hysteron Proteron Club =

Dining club originating at Balliol College, Oxford

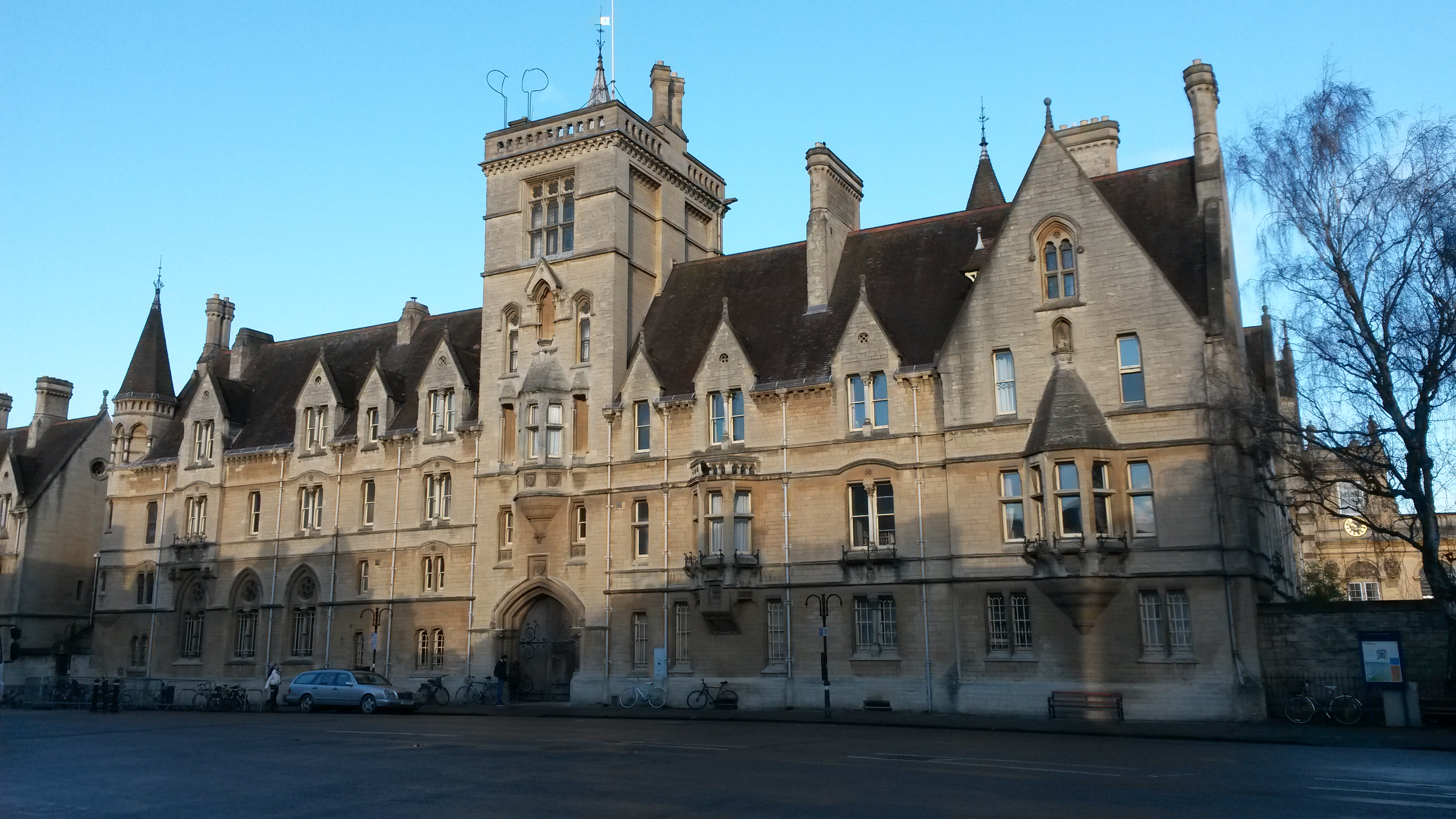
Balliol College, where the Club originated

The Hysteron Proteron Club, sometimes spelt "Husteron Proteron", was a dining club at Balliol College, Oxford, in the 1920s and revived at Trinity College, Oxford, in 1980.

== Name ==
The name refers to a hysteron proteron, a rhetorical device and figure of speech in which a natural or rational order is reversed, as in phrase "then came the thunder and the lightning".

== History ==
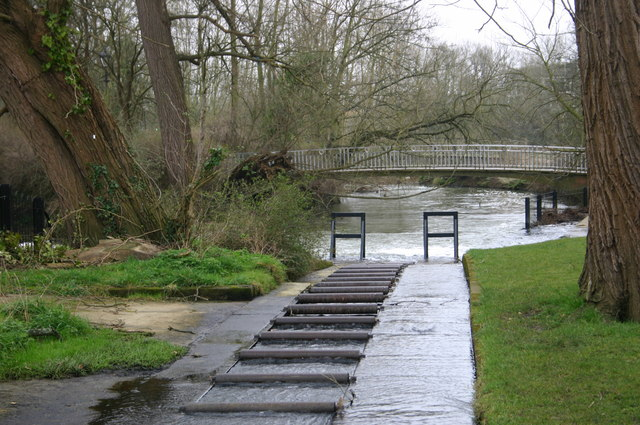
Parson's Pleasure

The main purpose of the Hysteron Proteron Club was to eat meals backwards, and there was at least one dinner per term, which began with coffee and liqueurs and ended with the soup course. However, the Club's activities went beyond this. Neville Shute later remembered a meal which lasted for twelve hours, beginning at 9 am and going on until 9 pm, starting with coffee and followed by a naked swim at Parsons' Pleasure, usually a pre-breakfast activity. Another dinner was a so-called “circular feast”, at which the courses were, as usual, eaten backwards and each was eaten at a different place around Oxford, beginning and ending at rooms in St Michael's Street.

Graham Greene was a member and told his mother that once a term the club had a "backwards day". He reported that after finishing with porridge "we then returned backwards to Balliol... This morning started with bridge in dinner jackets". Evelyn Waugh, who had been at another college from 1922 to 1924, similarly recalled in A Little Learning that members "put themselves to great discomfort by living a day in reverse". In 1954, Keith Hancock (1898–1988), a distinguished Australian historian, who was at Balliol in the 1920s, revealed that he had "hankered secretly for an invitation to join the Husteron Proteron Club".

The club was revived in 1980 at Trinity College, Oxford by a classicist, Michael Leahy, with a group of fellow Trinity undergraduates including Michael Fiddes, Paul Browne, and Chris Fairey. The full day backwards was properly done, beginning the day with cigars, brandy and port in black tie, followed by a formal dinner eaten backwards. This was followed (at the appropriate interval) by a backwards lunch and a backwards breakfast. The initial idea of a pre breakfast rowing session could not unfortunately occur as breakfast was taken at around 8 pm. The day was somewhat surreal, but all survived very happily. {pers.recollection, February 2026).

== Allusions ==
In 1999, Peter Brooke, the son of a Club member, referred to the Club during a debate in the House of Commons on the Greater London Authority Bill:

There is an element of usterou proterou, or the Husteron and Proteron club, in the order in which events have been presented. That club existed at the university of Oxford in the 1920s. Once a term, its members lived their lives backwards. They would get up, have a whisky and soda and then play some bridge. They would end up by having porridge late at night. In the Bill, the fact that the advice that various people give the mayor cannot be requested comes before the provisions for appointments and for the terms and conditions of those who are appointed. I understand that Bills have to be constructed in that way, but that does not make them easier to understand.

He mentioned the Club again in a debate on the Learning and Skills Bill in 2000, and again in the House of Lords in July 2002.

== Notable members ==
- Nevil Shute (1899–1960)
- Victor Hely-Hutchinson (1901–1947)
- Henry Brooke (1903–1984)
- Graham Greene (1904–1991)

== See also ==
- George Hysteron-Proteron
