= Highclere, Kingsclere and Basingstoke Light Railway =

Overview
- Status: Proposed (abandoned)
- Locale: Hampshire
- Termini: Highclere; Basingstoke
- Stations: 8

Service
- Type: Light rail

Technical
- Line length: 12 miles (19 km) (approximate)

The Highclere, Kingsclere and Basingstoke Light Railway was a proposed light railway in Hampshire, England, connecting the Didcot, Newbury and Southampton Railway (DNSR) with the London and South Western Railway (LSWR). Despite public support of the railway proposal, sufficient funding was never obtained and the proposals were abandoned.

== History ==
The passing of the Light Railways Act 1896 (59 & 60 Vict. c. 48) led to the proposal of two light railways in Hampshire—the Basingstoke and Alton Light Railway and the Highclere, Kingsclere and Basingstoke Light Railway. The former was begun in 1898, and in 1900 a proposal for the Highclere—Basingstoke line was issued. The proposal called for public subscription, and sufficient interest was gathered to allow an amount of land in Kingsclere (at the present-day Wellmans Meadow, 51.3294°N 1.2518°W) to be purchased for Kingsclere Station. Other methods of acquiring land included offering landowners shares in the railway in return for access to their land.

There was much public interest in Kingsclere about the railway, though sufficient funds—in either cash or shares—were never raised and the proposal was dropped in the early 20th century.

== Route ==
The proposed railway would have diverged from the DNSR south of Highclere near the village of Burghclere. From there it would have headed south-east through the villages of Ecchinswell, Kingsclere, Wolverton, Ramsdell, Monk Sherborne and Sherborne St John. Each of these villages would have been served by its own station.
