= 67th Regiment of Foot (disambiguation) =

Two regiments of the British Army have been numbered the 67th Regiment of Foot:

- 67th Regiment of Foot (1745), or The Duke of Bolton's Regiment, raised in 1745 and disbanded in 1746
- 67th (South Hampshire) Regiment of Foot, raised in 1756.
