= Martin Evans (Royal Navy officer) =

English cricketer and Royal Navy officer

Captain Martin Evans CBE
- Born: Martin James Evans; 16 October 1904; Kingsclere, Hampshire, England
- Died: 17 December 1998 (aged 94); Peasmarsh, Sussex, England
- Cricket career

Cricket information
- Batting: Unknown
- Bowling: Unknown-arm fast-medium

Career statistics
Competition	First-class
Matches	1
Runs scored	8
Batting average	8.00
100s/50s	–/–
Top score	7*
Balls bowled	54
Wickets	0
Bowling average	–
5 wickets in innings	–
10 wickets in match	–
Best bowling	–
Catches/stumpings	–/–
- Source: Cricinfo, 21 September 2019

Martin James Evans CBE (16 October 1904 – 17 December 1998) was a Royal Navy officer and English first-class cricketer.

Evans was born in October 1904 at Kingsclere, Hampshire. After joining the Royal Navy, he was promoted from the rank of midshipman to sub-lieutenant in July 1925. He made a single appearance in first-class cricket for the Royal Navy against the British Army cricket team at Lord's in 1925. Batting twice in the match, he ended the Royal Navy first-innings not out on 7, while in their second-innings he was dismissed for a single run by Geoffrey Cooke. With the ball, he bowled a total of nine wicketless overs in the Army first-innings, conceding 42 runs. He was promoted to the rank of lieutenant in February 1927, with promotion to the rank of lieutenant commander in February 1935.

Evans served with the Royal Navy in the Second World War, during which he was promoted to the rank of commander in December 1940. During the war he held commands aboard HMS Keppel, HMS Towy and HMS Philante. He was made an OBE in December 1942, before being made a CBE in August 1945. Following the war, he was awarded the Legion of Merit by the United States in May 1946 and promoted to the rank of captain the following month. Evans died in December 1998 at Peasmarsh Place retirement home in the Sussex village of Peasmarsh.
