= Litchfield railway station =

Disused railway station in Hampshire, England

Coordinates: 51.2806°N 1.3419°W

Litchfield
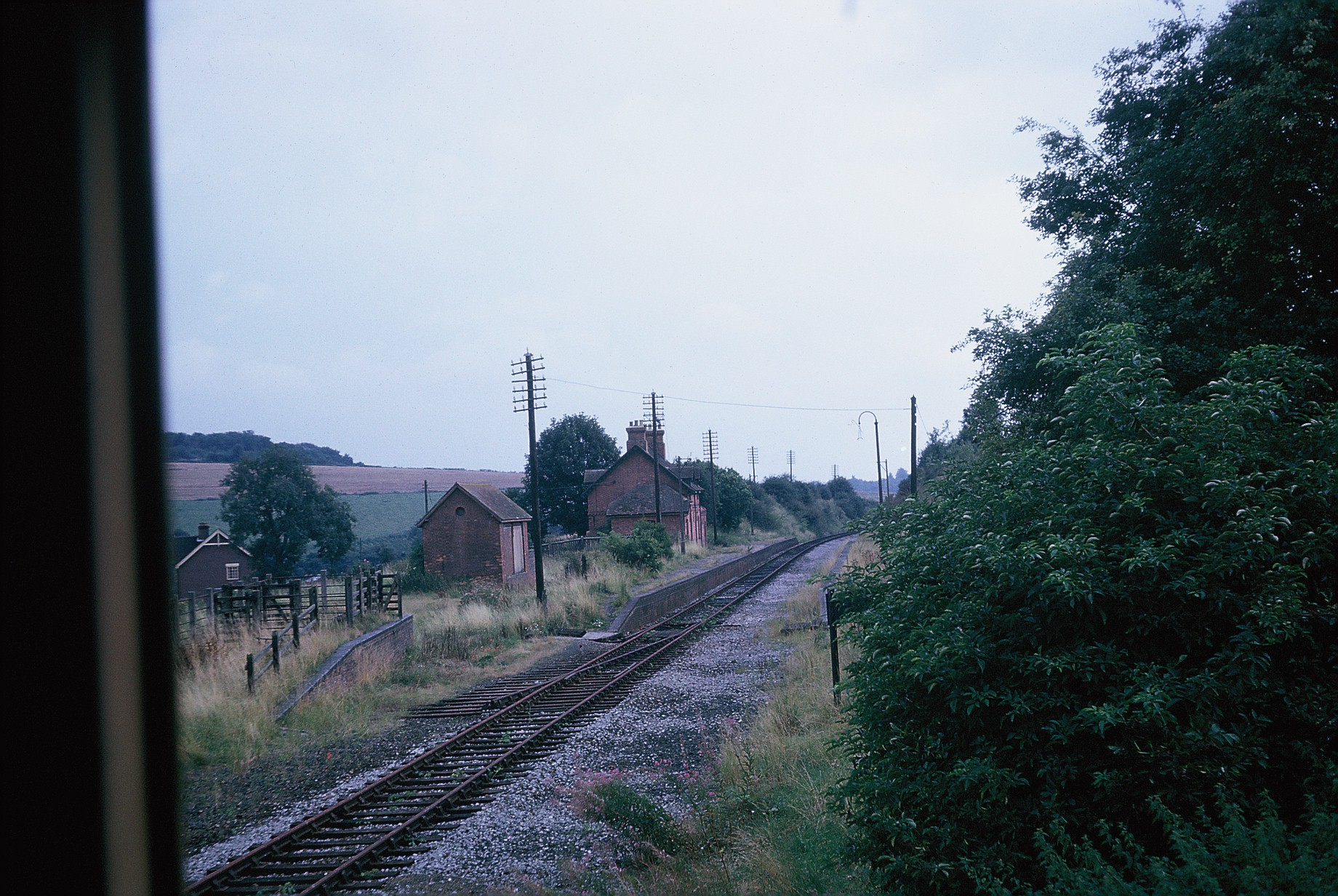

General information
- Location: Litchfield, Basingstoke and Deane; England
- Grid reference: SU460537
- Platforms: 2

Other information
- Status: Disused

History
- Original company: Didcot, Newbury and Southampton Railway
- Pre-grouping: Didcot, Newbury and Southampton Railway
- Post-grouping: Great Western Railway

Key dates
- 4 May 1885: Opened as Litchfield
- 7 June 1909: Renamed Litchfield (Hants)
- 4 August 1942: Closed
- 8 March 1943: Re-opened as Litchfield (Hants)
- 13 June 1955: Renamed Litchfield
- 7 March 1960: Station closed
Location

Litchfield railway station, on the Didcot, Newbury and Southampton Railway, served the village of Litchfield, Hampshire, England. By the 1920s, the station served approximately 20 passengers per week. It closed in 1960.

== Station layout ==
The station was originally built with two platforms and a passing loop in the same style as other stations on the route. However, low traffic resulted in the removal of the loop in 1936, only for a longer loop and the platform to be reinstated in 1943 to deal with wartime traffic. This was then removed again in 1955. There was a small siding and headshunt on the northbound line but goods traffic at the station was light.

== The site today ==
The station was sold by Hampshire County Council in 1978 and has been restored, and is now a private house; the approach road is now a private drive to the property. In 1976 the Litchfield–Whitchurch bypass was opened and made use of the trackbed south of the village.

== Routes ==
Preceding station	Disused railways	Following station
Burghclere; Line and station closed	Great Western Railway; Didcot, Newbury and Southampton Railway	Whitchurch Town; Line and station closed
