= North Oakley =

Hamlet in Hampshire, England

Coordinates: 51.283454°N 1.229798°W

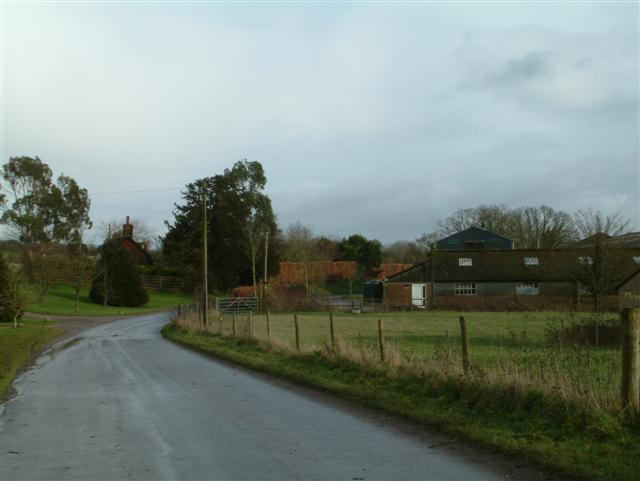
- The Manor Farm, North Oakley

- Location within Hampshire
- OS grid reference: SU5381354094
- District: Basingstoke and Deane
- Shire county: Hampshire
- Region: South East
- Country: England
- Sovereign state: United Kingdom
- Post town: TADLEY
- Postcode district: RG26
- Dialling code: 01256
- Police: Hampshire and Isle of Wight
- Fire: Hampshire and Isle of Wight
- Ambulance: South Central
- UK Parliament: Basingstoke

North Oakley is a hamlet in the civil parish of Hannington in the Basingstoke and Deane district of Hampshire, England. Its nearest town is Tadley, which lies approximately 6.4 miles (10.3 km) north-east from the village.

== Governance ==
The hamlet of North Oakley is part of the civil parish of Hannington, (where the 2011 Census was included) and is part of the Kingsclere ward of Basingstoke and Deane borough council. The borough council is a Non-metropolitan district of Hampshire County Council.
