= Hysteron proteron =

Figure of speech reversing a natural or rational order

The hysteron proteron (from the Greek: ὕστερον πρότερον, hýsteron próteron, "later earlier") is a rhetorical device. It occurs when the first key word of the idea refers to something that happens temporally later than the second key word. The goal is to call attention to the more important idea by placing it first.

The standard example comes from the Aeneid of Virgil: "Moriamur, et in media arma ruamus" ("Let us die, and charge into the thick of the fight"; ii. 353). An example of hysteron proteron encountered in everyday life is the common reference to putting on one's "shoes and socks", rather than "socks and shoes".

By this deliberate reversal, hysteron proteron draws attention to the important point, so giving it primacy. Hysteron proteron is a form of hyperbaton, which describes general rearrangements of the sentence.

It can also be defined as a figure of speech consisting of the reversal of a natural or rational order (as in "then came the thunder and the lightning").

== Example from the Quran ==
An example from the Quran that demonstrates hysteron proteron, verse (aya) number 89–90 from Sura Number 21 says that God granted Zechariah's prayer for a son even though Zechariah was very old and his wife was sterile:

We granted his prayer and gave him John, and we made his wife fertile for him.

A more conventional phrasing would be: "We granted his prayer; we made his wife fertile for him; and [having done so] we gave him John." The reversal of the expected sequence (hysteron proteron) in the verse suggests immediacy: Zechariah's prayer was granted without any delay at all, so much so that the detail itself, "We made his wife fertile for him," was not allowed to intervene between the prayer and its acceptance.

== See also ==
- Begging the question, a subtype of which is sometimes called "hysteron proteron" as well
- Cart before the horse
- George Hysteron-Proteron
- Hysteron Proteron Club
