= Litchfield, Hampshire =

Village and parish in Hampshire, England

Coordinates: 51.2797°N 1.3404°W

Litchfield
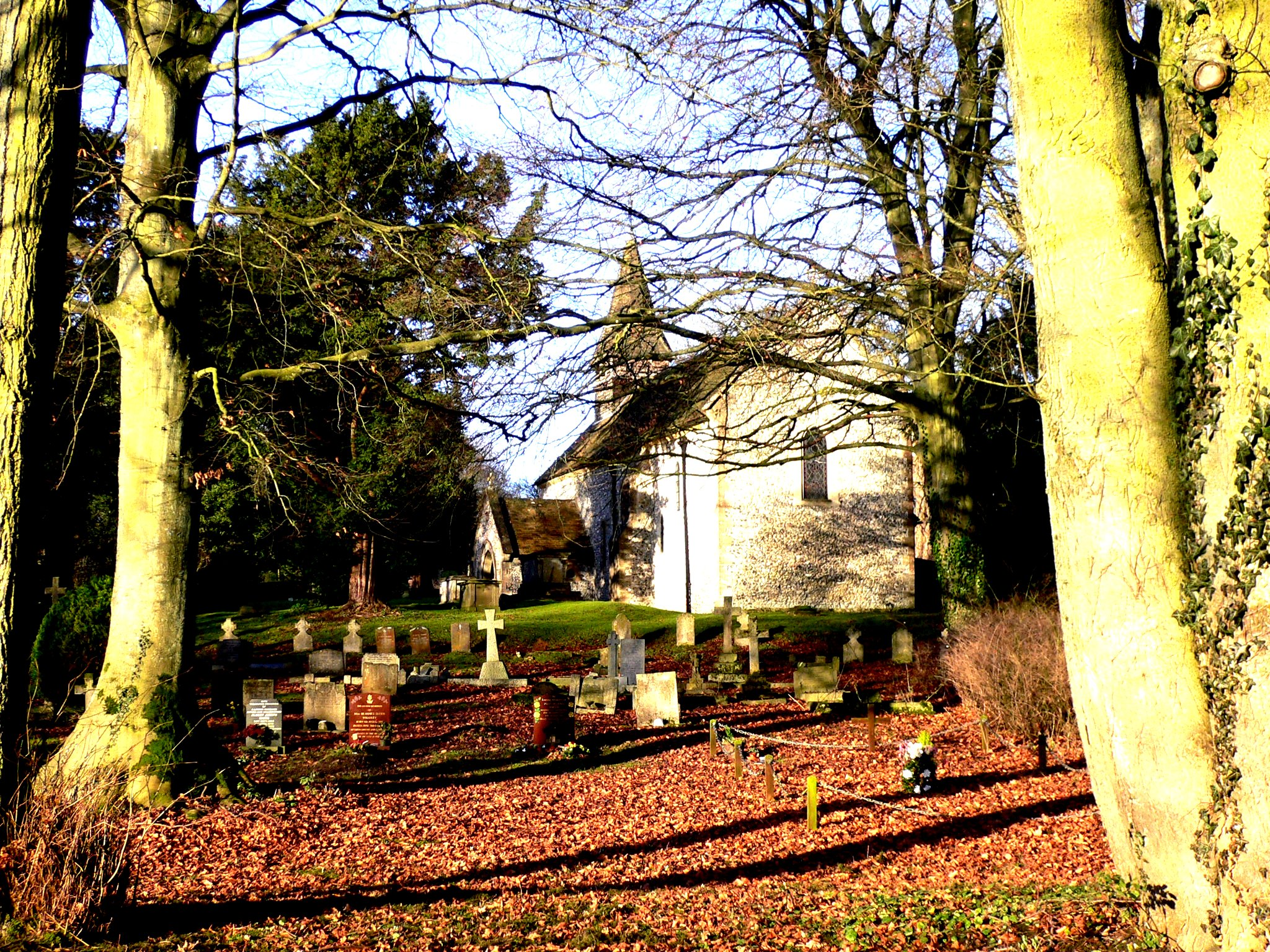
- Litchfield churchyard

- Location within Hampshire
- OS grid reference: SU461536
- Civil parish: Litchfield and Woodcott
- District: Basingstoke and Deane
- Shire county: Hampshire
- Region: South East
- Country: England
- Sovereign state: United Kingdom
- Post town: WHITCHURCH
- Postcode district: RG28
- Dialling code: 01256
- Police: Hampshire and Isle of Wight
- Fire: Hampshire and Isle of Wight
- Ambulance: South Central
- UK Parliament: North West Hampshire

Litchfield is a village and former civil parish, now in the parish of Litchfield and Woodcott, in the Basingstoke and Deane district of Hampshire, England. It is closely bypassed by the A34 trunk road between Newbury and Whitchurch, which follows the course of the former Didcot, Newbury and Southampton Railway. Litchfield railway station, which closed in 1960, was on this line. The station is a private house. The station was sold by Hampshire County Council in 1978 and has been restored. The approach road is now a private drive to the property. In 1976 the Litchfield - Whitchurch bypass was opened and made use of the DN&SR trackbed south of Litchfield towards Whitchurch for a distance of one mile. In 1931 the parish had a population of 88.

== Governance ==
The village is part of the Burghclere, Highclere and St. Mary Bourne ward of Basingstoke and Deane borough council. The borough council is a non-metropolitan district council of Hampshire County Council. On 1 April 1932 the parish was abolished to form "Litchfield and Woodcott".

== Church of St James the Less ==
The church of St James the Less is a Grade II* listed building.
