= Lavinia Fenton =

English actress (1708–1760)

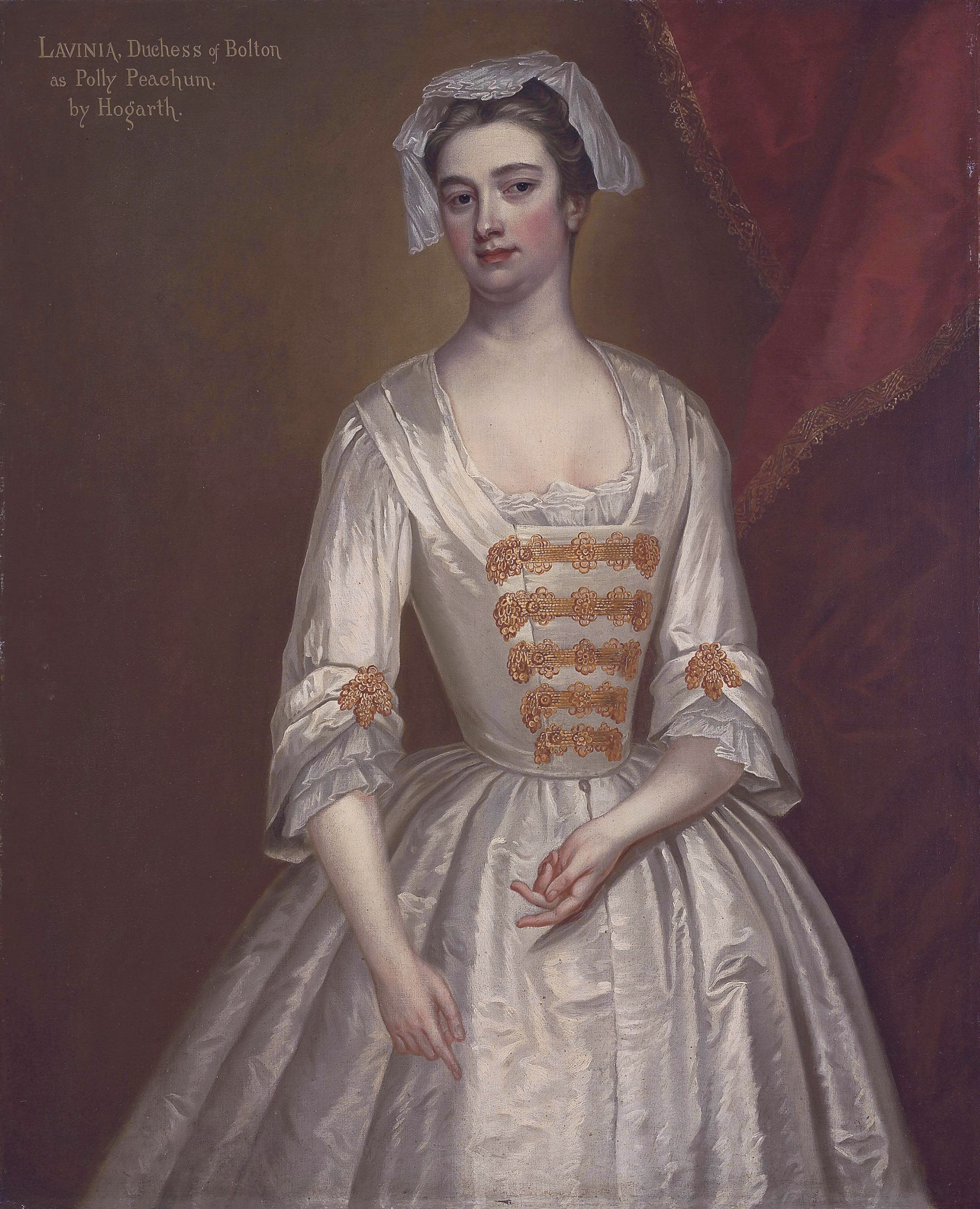
Lavinia Fenton as Polly Peachum in John Gay's Beggar's Opera (Charles Jervas)

Lavinia Powlett, Duchess of Bolton (1708 – 24 January 1760), known by her stagename as Lavinia Fenton, was an English actress who was the mistress and later the wife of the 3rd Duke of Bolton.

== Life and career ==
She was probably the daughter of a naval lieutenant named Beswick, but she bore the name of her mother's husband, who was a coffee-house owner. She was thought to have been born in Charing Cross, London, and had been a child prostitute, a waitress, and a barmaid before becoming an actress. One of her biographers describes her as having "a vivacious, lively spirit, and a promising beauty", displaying "some singular turns of wit, which shew'd her of an aspiring genius".

Her first appearance was as Monimia in Thomas Otway's The Orphan: or The Unhappy Marriage, in March 1726 at the Haymarket Theatre. Shortly thereafter she received profits from a benefit performance, and took the role of Cherry Boniface in The Beaux Stratagem. She then joined the company of players at the Lincoln's Inn Fields Theatre, where she earned "the not very magnificent salary of fifteen shillings", but her success and beauty made her the toast of the beaux. The critic Mrs Charles Mathews noted: "The abilities of Miss Fenton cannot be disputed; the universal panegyrics of the time, and the anxiety of the managers to monopolise her services, assure us that no actress or singer could at any period of the drama be more popular".

It was in John Gay's Beggar's Opera, as Polly Peachum, that Miss Fenton made her greatest success; she debuted the role on 29 January 1728. Fenton's portrayal of Polly was so popular that Londoners were identifying her as Polly both on and offstage. Her pictures were in great demand, songs and verses were written to her and books published about her, and she was the most talked-of person in London. Hogarth's picture shows her in one of the scenes, with her future husband, the Duke of Bolton, in a box. After the play's first run, Fenton's salary was doubled, and she appeared as Alida in John Vanbrugh's adaptation of The Pilgrim. Two of her notable roles are Leanthe (Love and a Bottle, a comedy by the Irish writer George Farquhar, 1698), and Ophelia (Hamlet).

She appeared in several comedies, and then in numerous repetitions of the Beggar's Opera. After her last appearance as Polly on 19 April 1728, she ran away with her lover Charles Powlett, 3rd Duke of Bolton, a man 23 years older than herself, who, after the death of his wife in 1751, married her at Aix-en-Provence. John Gay discussed her marriage in a letter to Jonathan Swift: "The Duke of Bolton, I hear, has run away with Polly Peachum, having settled £400 a year on her during pleasure, and upon disagreement £200 a year". They already had three sons: Charles, Percy, and Horatio Armand, who entered the church, the navy, and the army respectively. According to Historic England, she reputedly lived at a house now called The Grange in Edington, Wiltshire, near Westbury.

The duchess survived her husband and died in 1760 at Westcombe House in Greenwich, being buried in St Alfege Church, Greenwich on 3 February 1760. Peachum Road, close to the site of Westcombe House, was named after her role as Polly Peachum.

== See also ==
- List of entertainers who married titled Britons
