= 67th Regiment of Foot (1745) =

- Active: 1745–1746
- Country: Kingdom of Great Britain
- Branch: British Army
- Type: Infantry
- Engagements: Jacobite rising of 1745

Commanders
- Colonel of the Regiment: Charles Powlett, 3rd Duke of Bolton

The 67th Regiment of Foot, or Bolton's Regiment, was a regiment in the British Army from 1745 to 1746.

== History ==
In response to the Jacobite rising of 1745, the regiment was raised in Hampshire by Charles Powlett, 3rd Duke of Bolton. However, the Duke did not command the regiment on the field. Its lieutenant colonel was Matthews Sewell. The new regiment received the rank of 67th. As of January 30, 1746, it mustered 618 NCOs and privates for an authorized strength of 780.

Quartered at Winchester, the regiment was declared "half complete" by November 15.

In December, the whole regiment was relocated to Portsmouth. The regiment marched to Salisbury in April. On June 7, it was ordered to Winchester and was disbanded there six days later.

Horatio Gates was commissioned as a lieutenant in the Duke of Bolton's Regiment. Serving next to him was a lieutenant named John Burgoyne but he was probably not the future general who would later be defeated by Gates.

== Uniform ==
Most of the regiment raised by noblemen in 1745 had blue coats and red facings.
