= J. K. Stanford =

British writer

J. K. Stanford

John Keith Stanford OBE MC (29 April 1892 – 24 September 1971) was a British civil servant who worked in Burma and wrote many books on sport, humour, and natural history.

Stanford was born in Aldringham, Suffolk and educated at Rugby School and St. John's College, Oxford. He was commissioned into the Suffolk Regiment in 1915 and was attached to the Tank Corps from 1917. At the end of the First World War he held the rank of captain. Appointed to the Indian Civil Service (Burma services) on 24 October 1919, he arrived in India on 24 December 1919. He married Evelyn Lushington née Hirst just before his move to India but the marriage failed and they had a child in 1922. After a divorce he married his Eleanor, née Davies, in 1927.

He held the following positions:

- Deputy director of Commercial Intelligence, Calcutta, January 1922.
- Services placed at the government of Burma's disposal, June 1923.
- Under Secretary Home and Police Department, December 1923.
- Officiating Deputy Commissioner, June 1924
- Registrar, High Court, Rangoon, June 1925
- Officiating deputy commissioner, June 1927
- District commissioner of Prome District 1929
- District commissioner of Insein District 1930
- Secretary Revenue Department, Burma, June 1932.
- Deputy commissioner for Myitkyina from 1932 to 1936.

Following his time in Prome & Insein District, he played a part in the suppression of the Burma Rebellion 1930–31. He was awarded an O.B.E., 1932. He retired in 1938 and then took part in Vernay-Cutting expedition to the North-East Burma Hills. Between 1927 and 1939 he did much ornithological work in Burma. Amongst his other publications was The Birds of Northern Burma 1938.

In 1939, he was commissioned lieutenant in the National Defence Companies. In 1940, Stanford transferred to the Royal Army Ordnance Corps. He retired in 1945 with the rank of lieutenant colonel.

His granddaughter Melissa Stanford is married to William Pleydell-Bouverie, 9th Earl of Radnor.

== List of works ==
Stanford wrote 27 books, and was a regular contributor to The Field, Shooting Times, Ibis, the journal of the Bombay Natural History Society, and other magazines. He served as a secretary for the Kipling Society and was, for a period, Vice-President of the British Ornithologists' Union (BOU).

Many of his books are about hunting and shooting, ornithology, and British colonial life between the world wars. He also enjoyed poetry and his witty Rarissima avis ("By far the rarest bird of all is the bird on the lawn of my aunt") which he recited often was included in his Bewilderment of Birds (1954). (dates from Bodleian Library catalogue)

- The Twelfth (1944, rev. 1964 as The Twelfth and After: being the life and death of George Hysteron-Proteron)
- Far Ridges: a record of travel in north-eastern Burma 1938–9 (1946)
- The Awl-Birds (1949)
- Guns Wanted (1949)
- Bledgrave Hall (1950)
- Reverie of a Qu'Hai, & other Stories (1951)
- Last Chukker (1951)
- No Sportsman at All (1952)
- House of Edward Stanford Ltd. 1852–1952, by Lt Col J. K. Stanford and E. G. Godfrey (1952)
- Full Moon at Sweatenham: a nightmare (1953)
- A Bewilderment of Birds (1954)
- British Friesians: A History of the Breed (1956)
- Fox Me: the story of a cub (1958)
- Jimmy Bundobust (1958)
- The Wandering Gun (1960)
- Death of a Vulpicide (1960)
- Ladies in the Sun: the Memsahibs' India, 1790–1860 (1962)
- Broken Lanterns (1962)
- And Some in Horses (1965)
- Tail of an Army (1966)
- A Keeper's Country (1968, re-issued 1989)
- The Complex Gun (1968)
- Partridge Shooting
