= Wolverton, Hampshire =

Village and parish in Hampshire, England

Coordinates: 51.323862°N 1.208715°W

Wolverton
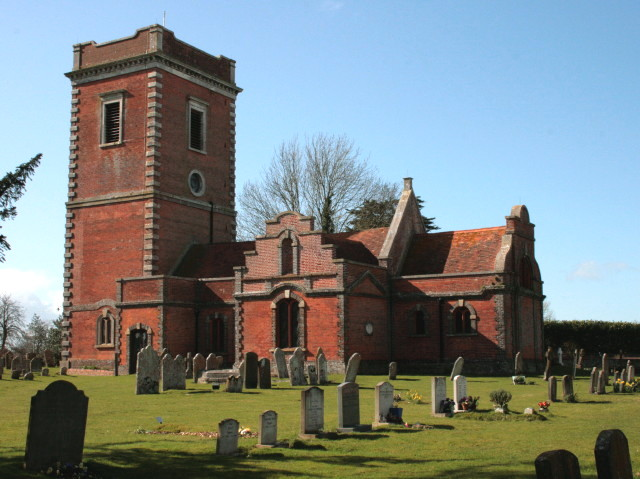
- St Catherine's Church

- Location within Hampshire
- OS grid reference: SU553585
- Civil parish: Baughurst
- District: Basingstoke and Deane
- Shire county: Hampshire
- Region: South East
- Country: England
- Sovereign state: United Kingdom
- Post town: TADLEY
- Postcode district: RG26
- Dialling code: 01635
- Police: Hampshire and Isle of Wight
- Fire: Hampshire and Isle of Wight
- Ambulance: South Central
- UK Parliament: North West Hampshire

Wolverton is a village in the civil parish of Baughurst, in the Basingstoke and Deane district in north Hampshire, England. It is approximately 7 miles (11 km) from both Newbury and Basingstoke.

== History ==
Named in the Domesday Book of 1086 as Ulvretune, Wolverton has a royal history. Circa 885, King Alfred gave the area – along with neighbouring Baughurst – to the Diocese of Winchester.

Pipe Rolls identify the existence of a royal household in the village as early as the 12th century, and that Eleanor of Aquitaine resided there in 1165 while her husband – Henry II – was in Normandy. The manor of Wolverton remained in royal ownership through the reigns of King John and Henry III, until possession was gained by the family of Peter Fitz Herbert some time after 1217.

In 1837, Sir Peter Pole, 2nd Baronet sold the manor to Arthur Wellesley, 1st Duke of Wellington, and it remained part of the Wellington estate until 1943. The present-day Wolverton House is a late-Georgian manor house, near to St Catherine's Church.

In 1931 the parish had a population of 157. On 1 April 1932 the parish was abolished and merged with Baughurst and Kingsclere.
