= Gervase Francis Newport Tinley =

British military commander

Colonel Gervase Francis Newport Tinley, CB, CMG (1857 – 18 February 1918) was a British officer in the Indian Army who ended his career as Base Commandant at Marseilles during the First World War.

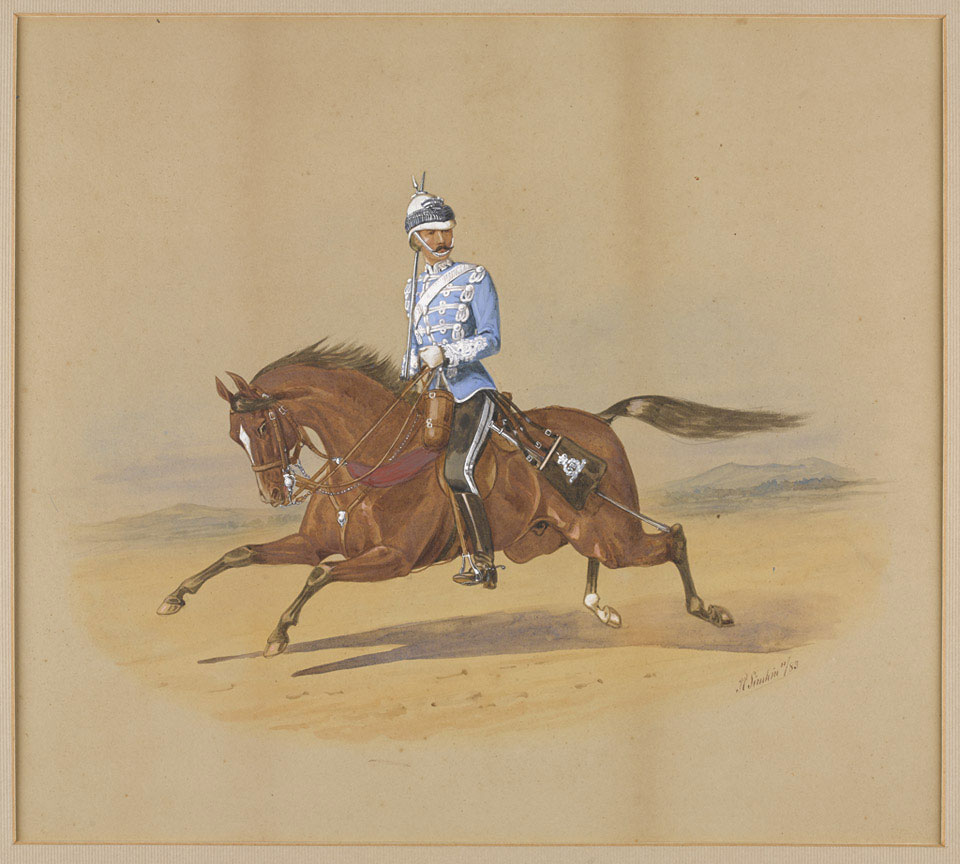
Lieutenant G. F. N. Tinley, 1st Bombay Light Cavalry, a watercolour by Richard Simkin, 1883.

== Early life ==
Tinley was born at Grahamstown in 1857, a son of Major General Robert N. Tinley, of the Cape Mounted Rifles. He entered Victoria College, Jersey, in 1868, leaving four years later to train as an officer at the Royal Military College, Sandhurst.

== Career ==
Portrait of Colonel Tinley, by an unknown artist, circa 1910.

After passing through Sandhurst, in 1875 Tinley was commissioned into the 83rd (County of Dublin) Regiment of Foot, and in 1876 was posted to India. When in 1881 the 83rd were posted home, he transferred to the 1st (Bombay) Light Cavalry, preferring active service in India.

He was promoted to captain in 1887, and major in 1896. His service included the North West Frontier's Zhob Valley Expedition in 1882 or 1884, and the Burmese Expedition from 1885 to 1889, in the latter of which he was wounded and his horse shot from under him. For this campaign, he was mentioned in despatches and received a campaign medal with two clasps. He was the 1st Bombay Lancers' Squadron Commandant from 23 October 1885, officiating second in command and Cantonment Magistrate at Neemuch and took part in the affair of Dawlatzai. He accompanied the Dongola Expedition of 1896; and one to Egypt later in the same year, and went on to command the 31st Duke of Connaught's Own Lancers (Staff Corps), 1st Bombay Lancers.

From 31 March 1902 he was commandant of the Staff Corps, 1st (Duke of Connaught's Own) Bombay Lancers (Bombay Army), and he was promoted to lieutenant-colonel on 10 September 1902.

From 1905 to 1908 he was Assistant Adjutant General (AAG) to the 7th Division in India and represented Indian Army Officers at Empress Victoria's Funeral, 1901. He also commanded the Indian Cavalry Contingent at the Coronation of Emperor Edward VII, 1902. He was promoted to colonel in 1905, and appointed a Companion of the Order of the Bath (CB) in 1909.

During the Great War, from 1914 till his death in 1918, he was Base Commandant on Lines of Communication, and for his services was three times mentioned in despatches and received the CMG and Légion d'honneur (Croix de Guerre) on 14 July 1917.

He died suddenly at Marseilles, while still on active service, 18 February 1918, and was buried in the cemetery at No. 24 Avenue General de Lattre de Tassigny.

== Some Medals and awards ==
Press photograph portrait of Colonel Tinley (Illustrated London News, 1917).

- Queen's Sudan Medal, 1896–1898;
- Coronation Medal, 1902;
- Delhi Durbar Medal, 1903;
- Khedive's Sudan Medal, 1896–1908;
- Legion of Honour, 14.07.1917;
- India General Service Medal (1854) (I.G.S. '54), 2 clasps (Burma 1885–87 and 1887–89);
- 1914 Star which was claimed by his son Major F.B.N. Tinley in 1919;
- His WW1 pair were issued by the Indian Government;
- Thrice or four times Mentioned in Despatches.

== Family ==
In 1891 Tinley married firstly Elsie Benton, a daughter of William Benton Hughes, of the U.S. Army (Quartermaster Staff) (West Point Officers in the Civil War, Class of 1856). She died in 1907. Their son Francis Benton Newport Tinley M.C., (despatches), (wounded), who joined the 20th Deccan Horse in 1911, was promoted to captain on 6 September 1915. He went on to rise to the rank of lieutenant-colonel and married Cicely Sophia and was killed in action in 1942. On 10 July 1912 he married secondly Beryl Randall Tytherleigh Easton at the Parish Church, St Thomas on the Bourne, Surrey, England. He was aged 54 and she was 21. She was the daughter of Francis Henry Tytherleigh Easton and Charlotte Grace Isolda Easton, nee Randall.

== Club ==
Tinley was a member of the Junior Naval and Military Club.
