= Charles Powlett, 3rd Duke of Bolton =

British landowner and Whig politician

Lieutenant-General His Grace The Duke of Bolton KG PC
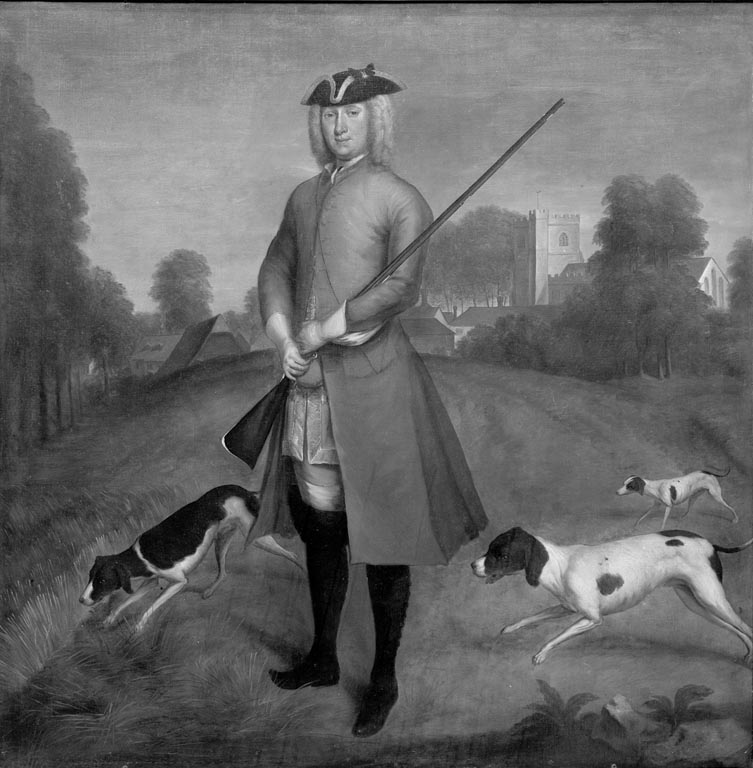
- Portrait by James Seymour, probably in Kingsclere

Personal details
- Born: 3 September 1685
- Died: 26 August 1754 (aged 68)
- Spouse(s): Lady Anne Vaughan (m. 1713, d. 1751); Lavinia Fenton (m. 1751)

Charles Powlett, 3rd Duke of Bolton (sometimes spelled Paulet; 3 September 1685 – 26 August 1754), styled Earl of Wiltshire from 1685 until 1699, and Marquess of Winchester from 1699 until 1722, was a British landowner and Whig politician who sat in the English House of Commons from 1705 to 1708 and in the British House of Commons between 1708 and 1717, when he was raised to the peerage as Lord Powlett of Basing and sat in the House of Lords.

Duke of Bolton, detail from William Hogarth's Beggar's Opera, 1731

== Early life ==
Powlett was born in 1685 at Chawton, Hampshire, the eldest son of Charles Paulet, 2nd Duke of Bolton, and his second wife Frances Ramsden, daughter of William Ramsden of Byram, Yorkshire. He was educated at Enfield School although his father had to remove him in 1699 for absenteeism and unruly behaviour. He travelled abroad with Anthony Ashley from 1700 to 1704. In 1705 he was a volunteer in the Portuguese campaign.

== Political career ==
Powlett was home in time to stand successfully as Whig at a by-election for Lymington on 7 December 1705. In 1708, he was elected MP for Hampshire in a close contest. However, the church interest supported the Tories following the Sacheverell trial, and he was defeated there in 1710 and 1713. In 1714 he was appointed Gentleman of the bedchamber to the Prince of Wales.

At the 1715 general election, Powlett was returned as MP for Carmarthenshire. In the same year he was appointed Governor of Milford Haven and Vice-Admiral of South Wales. He was also appointed Lord Lieutenant of Carmarthenshire and Glamorgan. He was created Baron Powlett of Basing through a clerical error on 12 April 1717; it had been intended for Powlett to be summoned to the Lords through a writ of acceleration employing his father's junior title of Baron St John (of Basing). Regardless of the error, Powlett had to give up his seat in the House of Commons. He became Colonel of the Royal Horse Guards in 1717.

In 1722 he succeeded to his father's estates and to the Dukedom of Bolton, making him one of the largest landowners in Hampshire and bringing control of some parliamentary seats; thus he became one of the principal electoral managers for the Whig government. He was appointed High Steward of Winchester, Warden of the New Forest and Lord Lieutenant of Hampshire and Dorset in the same year. He became a Privy Councillor on 1 June 1725 and was Lord Justice for the year 1725 to 1726. In 1726 he was appointed Commissioner for surveying lands for naval docks and Governor of the Isle of Wight.

In 1733 Powlett voted against the government and was dismissed from all his posts. In 1739, he became a founding governor of the Foundling Hospital in London, an orphanage for abandoned children. He became captain of the gentlemen pensioners in 1740. He was reconciled to Walpole and in 1742 was re-appointed to nearly all his previous posts, but he lost them all again in 1746.

== Jockey Club ==
He apparently founded an early form of the Jockey Club. A notice of 1729 records that “The Jockey Club, consisting of several Noblemen and Gentlemen, are to meet one Day next Week at Hackwood, the Duke of Bolton’s Seat in Hampshire, to consider of the Methods for the better keeping of their respective Strings of Horses at New Market.” In 1733 another newspaper noted he was going "to dine with the Jockey Club, at William's Coffee-house, St. James's."

== Family ==
William Hogarth's portrait of Lavinia, Duchess of Bolton

On 21 July 1713, he married Lady Anne Vaughan, a daughter of the 3rd Earl of Carbery. The marriage was not a happy one, and there were no children. In 1728, he began a long-standing affair with the well-known London actress, Lavinia Fenton. Lady Anne died in 1751 and the Duke married Lavinia Fenton on 20 October 1751 at Aix-en-Provence. She had already borne him three illegitimate sons: Charles, Percy, and Horatio Armand Powlett.

The third Duke of Bolton died in 1754, aged 68, at Royal Tunbridge Wells and was buried at Basing. After his death his brother Harry became the 4th Duke of Bolton.

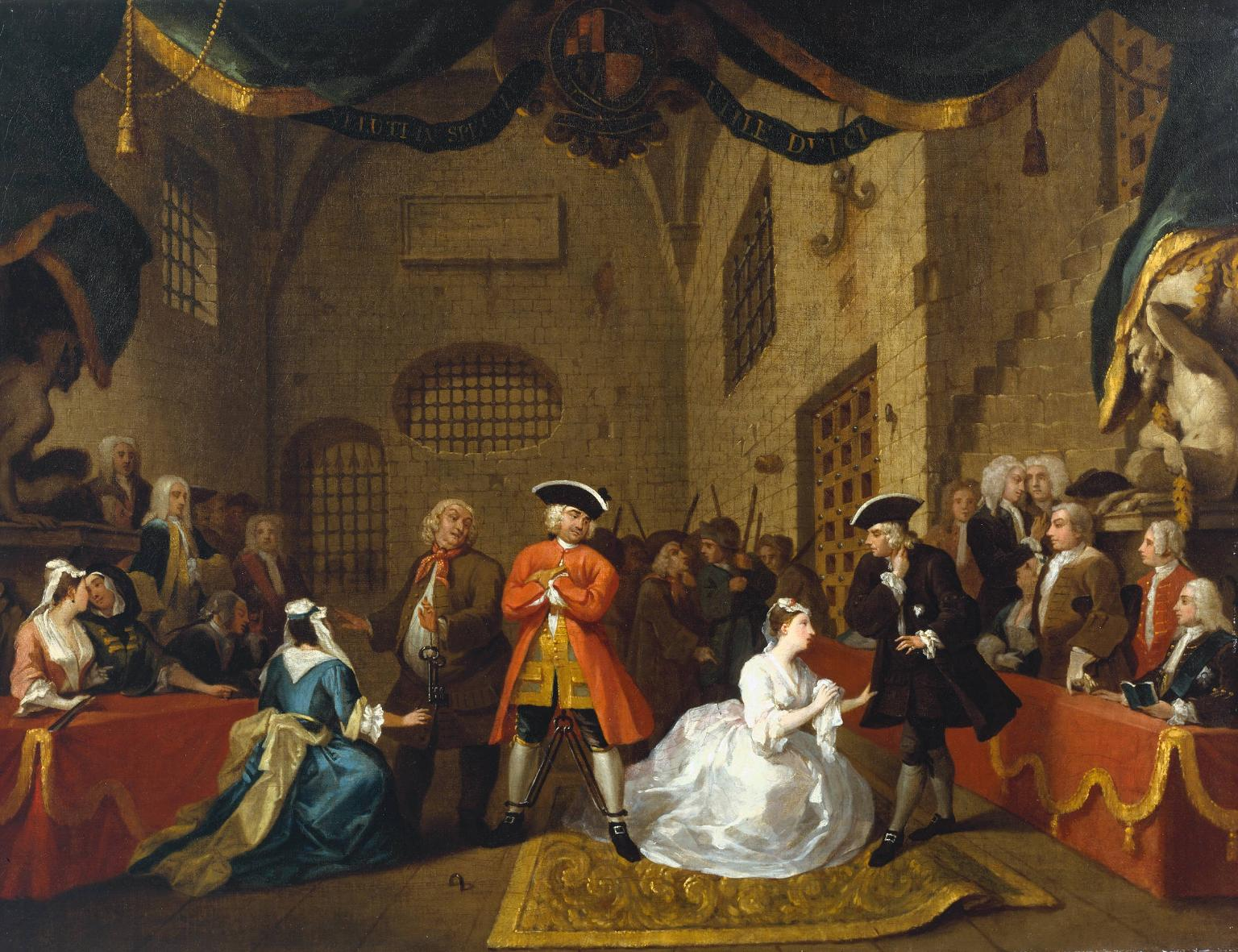
Hogarth's painting of The Beggar's Opera, scene VI, act III, 1731, (22.5 x 30 inches), featuring Lavinia as Polly Peacham (in white), with the Duke in the audience on the right, in blue wearing his Garter Star

== See also ==
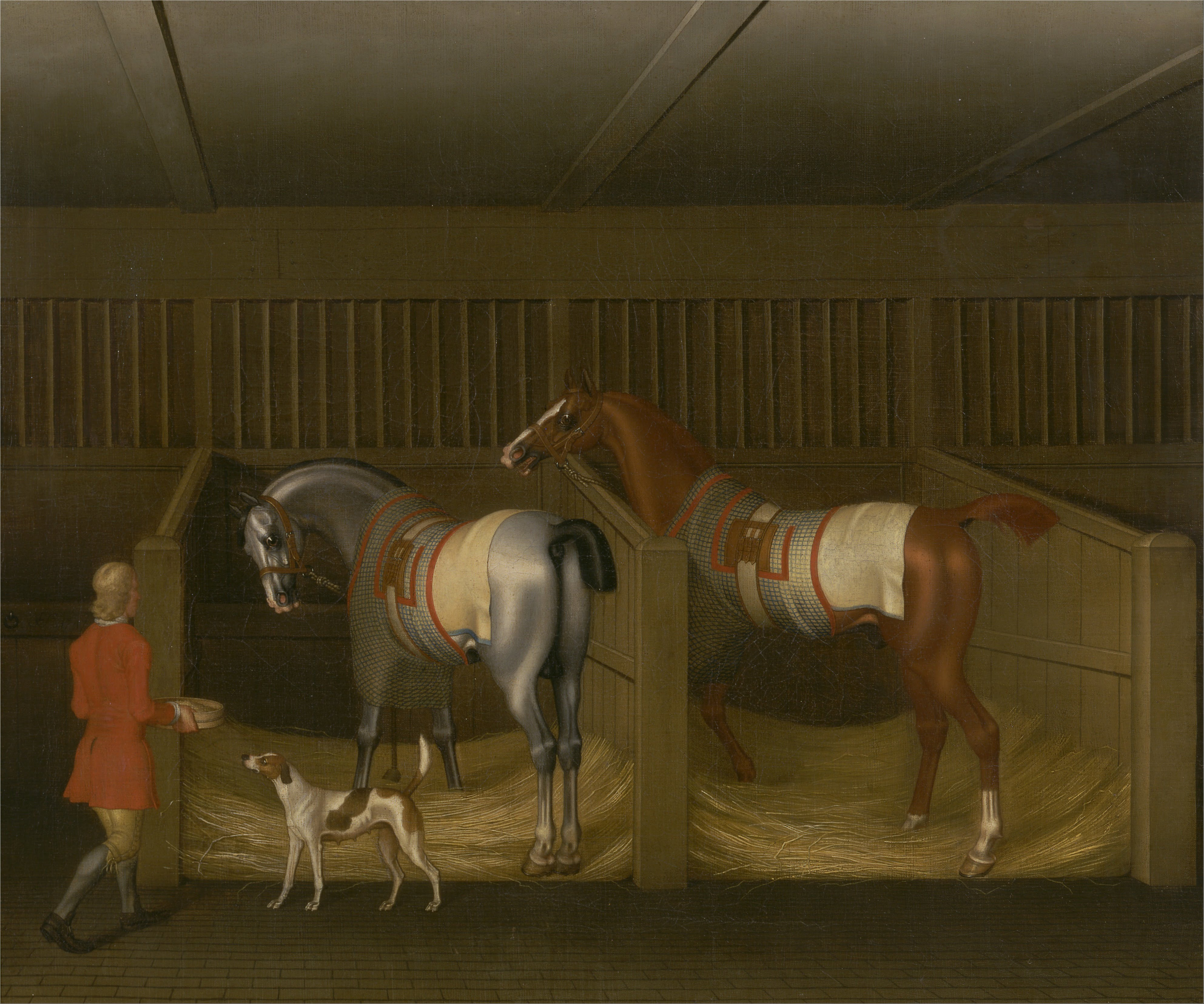
The Stables and Two Famous Running Horses belonging to His Grace, the Duke of Bolton, by James Seymour, 1747

- Winchester, New Hampshire, named in honour of Powlett as the Marquess of Winchester

Parliament of England
Preceded by Thomas Dore; Paul Burrard	Member of Parliament for Lymington; 1705–1707; With: Paul Burrard	Succeeded by Parliament of Great Britain
Parliament of Great Britain
Preceded by Parliament of England	Member of Parliament for Lymington; 1707–1708; With: Paul Burrard	Succeeded by Paul Burrard; Richard Chaundler
Preceded by Thomas Jervoise; Richard Chaundler	Member of Parliament for Hampshire; 1708–1710; With: Viscount Woodstock 1708–1709; Thomas Jervoise 1709–1710	Succeeded by George Pitt; Sir Simeon Stewart, Bt
Preceded by Sir Thomas Powell, Bt	Member of Parliament for Carmarthenshire; 1715–1717	Succeeded by Sir Thomas Stepney, Bt
Military offices
Preceded by The Duke of Argyll	Colonel of the Royal Horse Guards; 1717–1733	Succeeded by The Duke of Argyll
New regiment	Colonel of The Duke of Bolton's Regiment of Foot; 1745–1746	Regiment disbanded
Honorary titles
Preceded by The Earl of Carbery	Custos Rotulorum of Carmarthenshire; 1714–1735	Succeeded by Sir Nicholas Williams, Bt
Preceded by Sir Thomas Mansel, Bt	Vice-Admiral of South Wales; 1715–1754	Vacant
Preceded by The Duke of Bolton	Lord Lieutenant of Dorset; 1722–1733	Succeeded by The Earl of Shaftesbury
Preceded by The Duke of Bolton	Lord Lieutenant of Hampshire; 1722–1733	Succeeded by The Viscount Lymington
Preceded by The Earl of Lincoln	Constable of the Tower of London; Lord Lieutenant of the Tower Hamlets; 1725–1726	Succeeded by The Viscount Lonsdale
Preceded by The Earl Cadogan	Governor of the Isle of Wight; 1726–1733	Succeeded by The Duke of Montagu
Vacant Title last held by The Earl of Pembroke	Lord Lieutenant of Glamorgan; 1729–1754	Succeeded by The Earl of Plymouth
Preceded by The Earl of Pembroke	Custos Rotulorum of Glamorgan; 1728–1754	Succeeded by The Earl of Plymouth
Preceded by The Duke of Montagu	Captain of the Gentlemen Pensioners; 1740–1742	Succeeded by The Lord Bathurst
Preceded by George Trenchard	Vice-Admiral of Dorset; 1742–1754	Vacant Title next held by The Duke of Bolton
Preceded by The Viscount Lymington	Vice-Admiral and Governor of the Isle of Wight; 1742–1746	Succeeded by The Earl of Portsmouth
Preceded by The Viscount Lymington	Lord Lieutenant and Vice-Admiral of Hampshire; 1742–1754	Succeeded by The Duke of Bolton
Peerage of England
Preceded by Charles Paulet	Duke of Bolton; 1722–1754	Succeeded by Harry Powlett
Peerage of Great Britain
New creation	Baron Powlett of Basing; 1717–1754	Extinct
