= Charles Powlett =

English cricket patron and administrator (1728–1809)

The Reverend Charles Powlett (1728 – 29 January 1809) was a patron of English cricket who has been described as the mainstay, if not the actual founder, of the Hambledon Club. Powlett held an important position in the administration of cricket and was a member of the committee which revised and codified the Laws of Cricket in 1774.

== Life and career ==
Powlett (sometimes spelled Paulet) was the eldest son, born illegitimately, of Charles Powlett, 3rd Duke of Bolton and Lavinia Fenton, who were not married until 1751 when he was 23. Powlett was educated at Westminster School and Trinity College, Cambridge, where he graduated as MA in 1755. Having been ordained, he was Curate of Itchen Abbas from 1763 to 1792; and Rector of St Martin-by-Looe in Cornwall from 1785 to 1790.

Powlett acted as a Steward at Hambledon, was "the life and soul of the club for many years" and "when the end came, was the last to abandon the sinking ship". He died in Marylebone, London.

== Gambling ==
Despite being ordained and a Steward of the club and a member of the Laws of Cricket committee, Powlett was not above gambling on the outcome of matches or of betting against his own team. In 1775, when Hambledon/Hampshire hosted Surrey on Broadhalfpenny Down, the match situation at one point of the Hampshire second innings was such that a Surrey victory seemed certain. Powlett and his associate Philip Dehany, another Hambledon member, decided to bet heavily on Surrey to win. But then John Small was joined at the wicket by his captain Richard Nyren and the two put on a century partnership which turned the game around. Nyren was out for 98 and Small went on to make 136, which is the earliest known century in the history of first-class cricket. Surrey then collapsed and Hampshire won a famous victory. When Nyren was out, he was confronted by Powlett and Dehany who complained that he and Small had cost them their money. Nyren, disgusted with them, retorted: "Another time, don't bet your money against such men as we are".

== Bibliography ==
- Altham, H. S.; Swanton, E. W. (1962). A History of Cricket, Volume 1 (to 1914) (5th ed.). London: George Allen & Unwin. OCLC 894274808.
- Ashley-Cooper, F. S. (1924). Hambledon Cricket Chronicle: 1772–1796. London: Jenkins. OCLC 38498574.
- Underdown, David (2000). Start of Play. Westminster: Allen Lane. ISBN 978-07-13993-30-1 – via Internet Archive.
