= George Hysteron-Proteron =

Fictional character by J. K. Stanford

Colonel the Hon. George Hysteron-Proteron CB (c. 1874–1942) is a fictional character created by the author J. K. Stanford. A British soldier, sporting gun, and lord of the manor of Five Mile Wallop, Cambridgeshire, in his St James's home, the Qu'hais' Club, he was known as the Old Grouse-Cock, and he is most notable for his adventures after he wakes up in the morning on the day before the Twelfth of August and finds he has turned into a grouse.

He has been described as "a comic figure of sporting literature" and a "fanatical grouse shot".

== Origin and creation ==
Hysteron-Proteron's creator J. K. Stanford wrote in 1964 that "George ... owed his origin to a face in the East India Club ... On one occasion at breakfast he sent for the waiter and said, in my hearing, 'Didn't I order mutton cutlets with blood? There's no blood in these! Take them away!' "

The character first appeared in Stanford's first book, The Twelfth (1944), which was revised in 1964 as The Twelfth and After: being the life and death of George Hysteron-Proteron. The original book, The Twelfth, was written between 1942 and 1943 in the North African desert, while the author was serving with the British Eighth Army between El Alamein and Gabès.

A member of Boodle's wrote after receiving the book as a Christmas present in 1944: "I see the author mentions Boodle's. I don't know if he is a member here but there are six George Proterons sitting round me in the smoking-room at the moment."

The character's surname clearly originates in the term hysteron proteron, a rhetorical device.

== Early life ==
While still in the cot, Hysteron-Proteron shot his nanny in the backside with a pea-shooter. As he grew older, she insisted that he would never see heaven, and in due course he was educated at Eton, the Royal Military College, Sandhurst, "and the Badminton Library".

== Military career ==
He fought with the Black Scots regiment in Matabeleland and the Boer War and in France during the First World War, which he ended in 1918 as a Billeting Officer.

== Sportsman ==
Hysteron-Proteron was said to be "one of the ten or twelve best shots in the kingdom". He kept "a most elaborate game book" (that is, a detailed record of everything he killed) which in 1938 was in its twentieth volume. He had then shot "about 200,000 head".

== Family ==
Hysteron-Proteron was a younger son of Lord Parable, while his mother was "a Fleuchary of Brawl, in north Sutherland". His half-brother William Proteron was a Master of Foxhounds, but the two men did not speak to each other for thirty years, this being in connection with their rivalry to inherit the fortune of "a very rich but invalid Hysteron aunt in Suffolk", who when she died left her money equally between the Royal Society for the Prevention of Cruelty to Animals and the Society for the Abolition of Bloodsports. Hysteron-Proteron's first cousin Randolph Hysteron was a novelist whose "incredibly modern novels" included What the Hell does it matter? and God will call it Quits. His heroes were "lonely and apt to hang round brothels", and Hysteron-Proteron read his books.

Hysteron-Proteron never married, and his heir was a nephew, said in 1938 to be "in quod at this moment for dangerous driving on the Kingston By-pass".

== Religion ==
Until his final four years, Hysteron-Proteron's attendance at church was spasmodic, Sunday being his morning for going round his nests and rearing-field with the estate's head keeper, after his Friday and Saturday sport. However, after giving up shooting in 1938, he would often put on a dark blue suit, stiff white collar, spats, and bowler hat and attend church parade in the family pew.

Hysteron-Proteron found the Church of England's hymns ominous, and once asked the Vicar to lend him some books on the After-life, explaining "When I was a boy, it was just plain heaven and hell, and me nurse always insisted I should never see the first. You know what I mean: what are we in for?" He went on to explain his fears of milling around with the Cherubim: "I dislike crowds ... I can't stand community singin'! All that harpin' and allelujerin' and celestial choirs. Frightens me ... frightful glare there must be off the golden pavements. Don't like the prospect, meself!" He found the Vicar astonishingly ill-informed and uneasy.

== Life as a bird ==
J. K. Stanford's The Twelfth and After is largely the account of Hysteron-Proteron's adventures in the shape of a red grouse, a form in which he wakes up, as he nears the end of his shooting career, on the morning of the day before the Twelfth of August. Finding himself as a grouse on a grouse moor as the season begins, Hysteron-Proteron is able to use his life-time of experience as a game shot to escape death at the hands of his shooting friends. Indeed, he goes so far as to organise his fellow grouse to outwit the guns. To his great relief, he survives the grouse season and eventually returns to human form. He then gives up shooting and turns his energy to gardening instead.

== Honours and clubs ==
Hysteron-Proteron was appointed a Companion of the Order of the Bath in 1918, for military services. After he retired from shooting he became Patron and President of the Five Mile Wallop Horticultural Society.

He was a member of the Qu'hais' Club and Boodle's.
