= Highclere railway station =

Disused railway station in Hampshire, England

Coordinates: 51.3426°N 1.3352°W

Highclere
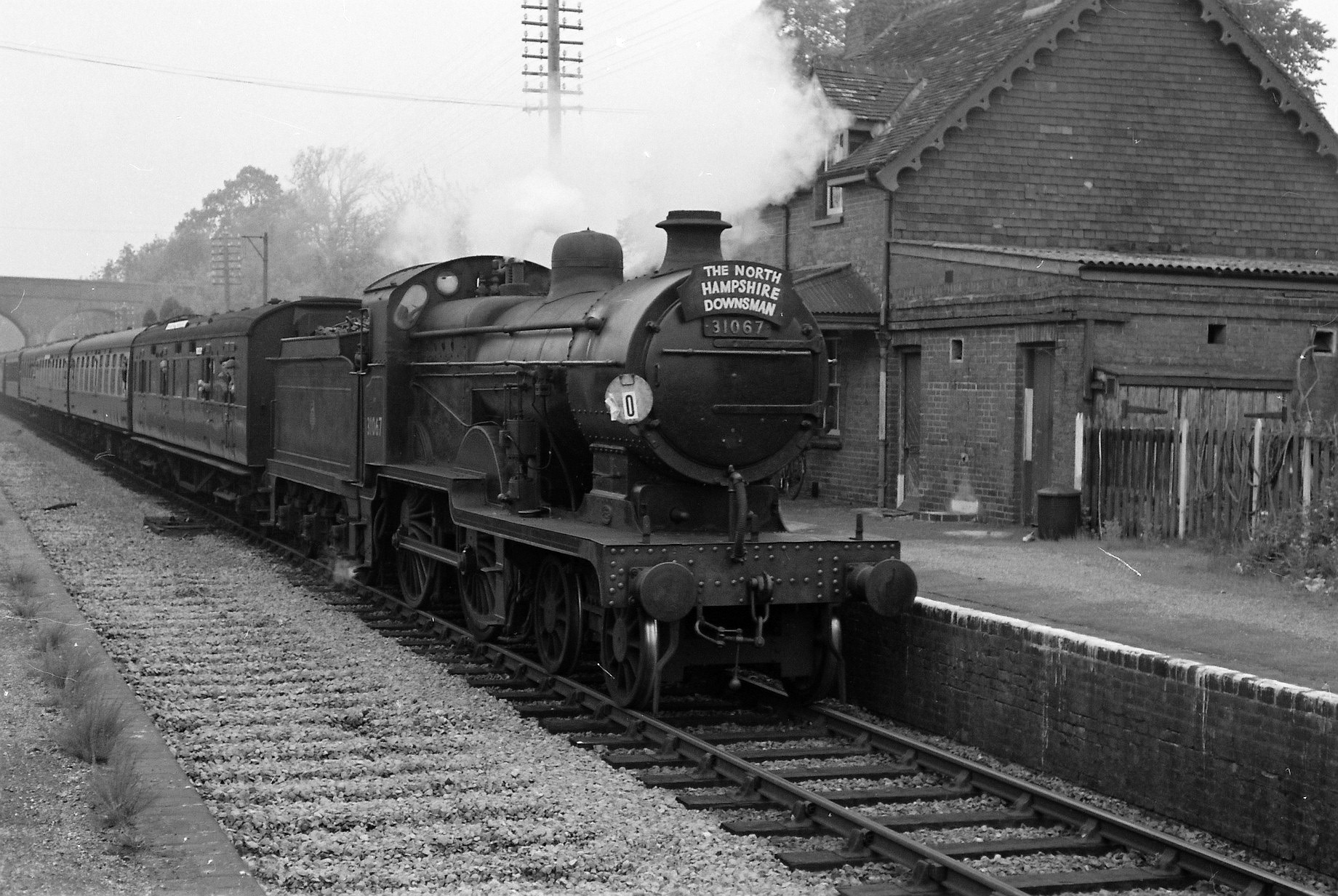

General information
- Location: Burghclere [sic], Basingstoke and Deane; England
- Grid reference: SU464606
- Platforms: 2

Other information
- Status: Disused

History
- Original company: Didcot, Newbury and Southampton Railway
- Pre-grouping: Didcot, Newbury and Southampton Railway
- Post-grouping: Great Western Railway

Key dates
- 4 May 1885: Opened
- 4 August 1942: Closed
- 8 March 1943: Re-opened
- 7 March 1960: Closed
Location

Highclere railway station was a station on the Didcot, Newbury and Southampton Railway in England. It shares the name of the nearby village of Highclere and Highclere Castle although Highclere station is actually in the village of Burghclere.

== Facilities ==
The station was very similar to other stations on the line with the standard passing loop, station building and a single siding to the south. To the north of the station the line was crossed on an unusually designed bridge by the A34 road.

== The site today ==
The road now occupies much of the track-bed to the south of the station, a move that took place when the trunk road became a dual carriageway. The A34 Newbury bypass now occupies the Tothill cutting which carried the line to the north of the station. The station building, goods shed, and signal box still remain to this day.

== Routes ==
| Preceding station | Disused railways | Following station |
|---|---|---|
| Woodhay; Line and station closed | Great Western Railway; Didcot, Newbury and Southampton Railway | Burghclere; Line and station closed |
